= Short on Cowboys =

- The Lowdown episode
- Episode no.: Season 1 Episode 4
- Directed by: Macon Blair
- Written by: Duffy Boudreau
- Cinematography by: Christopher Norr
- Editing by: Dane McMaster
- Original air date: October 7, 2025
- Running time: 52 minutes

Guest appearances
- Kaniehtiio Horn as Samantha; Ryan Kiera Armstrong as Francis; Jeanne Tripplehorn as Betty Jo; Scott Shepherd as Allen Murphy; Tim Blake Nelson as Dale Washberg; Cody Lightning as Waylon; Josh Fadem as Abel Belll; Mato Wayuhi as Chutto; Zachary Booth as Elijah; Dale Dickey as Bonnie; Eric Edelstein as Blackie; Johnny Pemberton as Berta; Kyle MacLachlan as Donald Washberg

Episode chronology
← Previous "Dinosaur Memories"	Next → "This Land?"

"Short on Cowboys" is the fourth episode of the American crime drama television series The Lowdown. The episode was written by co-executive producer Duffy Boudreau, and directed by Macon Blair, and aired on FX on October 7, 2025.

The series is set in Tulsa, Oklahoma, and follows self-styled "truthstorian" and bookseller Lee Raybon. As he struggles to form a steady relationship with his ex-wife and daughter, he begins to uncover a conspiracy revolving around a political candidate. In the episode, Lee tries to get close to Betty Jo to find more information, while Allen makes an investigation of his own.

According to Nielsen Media Research, the episode was seen by an estimated 0.180 million household viewers and gained a 0.02 ratings share among adults aged 18–49. The episode received mostly positive reviews from critics, who praised the performances, character development and twist ending.

== Plot ==
Reading Dale's letters, Lee learns that his relationship with Donald was strained over the past few years. Dale's ranch was approached by two gunmen at night, who were forced to flee when Dale shot at them. Recognizing the cap they left behind, Lee concludes that Blackie and Berta were sent to kill Dale, and that Allen murdered them for failing to do so, after Dale had a heated argument with Donald a week before his death.

Samantha picks up Francis and informs a disappointed Lee that she is marrying Johnny. A mysterious loiterer sells Lee a drawing of Dale, while Elijah warns that Donald is suing the Heartland Press for publishing Lee's article, and that he could face a restraining order. Betty Jo realizes Lee is attempting to follow her, and takes him to breakfast instead. They open up to each other and spend a drunken night at a bar, before sharing a kiss and returning to the ranch. Meanwhile, Allen shares with his Alcoholics Anonymous group that he was saved from addiction by his boss, and learns that Bonnie and Phil were questioned by Lee.

At the ranch, Betty Jo explains that Dale had grown paranoid and was secretly gay, but was a loving father to Pearl. Dale's gun goes off while Betty Jo is playfully threatening Lee, who accidentally fires the gun himself when he picks it up. She reveals that Dale's breaking point was his argument with his brother, who let slip that Pearl was actually conceived from Betty Jo and Donald's affair. Lee sleeps with Betty Jo, but believes she is manipulating him, unaware Donald sees him leaving in the morning. Allen contacts someone for help covering up the skinheads' murder, but is soon shot in the neck by a one-eyed gunman. He attempts to drive away but crashes, dying in the process.

== Production ==
=== Development ===
In September 2025, FX announced that the fourth episode of the season would be titled "Short on Cowboys", and that it would be written by co-executive producer Duffy Boudreau, and directed by Macon Blair. This marked Boudreau's first writing credit, and Blair's first directing credit.

=== Casting ===
The hitman that kills Allen at the end of the episode is played by Ty Mitchell, who previously worked with actor Scott Shepherd on the film Killers of the Flower Moon. Shepherd commented, "Ty was already a dear friend from hanging out in our downtime for that movie in Oklahoma, and so we were back in Oklahoma again [for this], and I was honored to be hunted by him."

== Reception ==
=== Viewers ===
In its original American broadcast on FX, "Short on Cowboys" was seen by an estimated 0.180 million household viewers with a 0.02 in the 18–49 demographics. This means that 0.02 percent of all households with televisions watched the episode. This was a 41% decrease in viewership from the previous episode, which was seen by an estimated 0.303 million household viewers with a 0.06 in the 18–49 demographics.

=== Critical reviews ===
"Short on Cowboys" received mostly positive reviews from critics. Amanda Whitting of Vulture gave the episode a 4 star out of 5 rating and wrote, "Lee is using Betty Jo, and of course Betty Jo is using Lee. But maybe it's less consequential than covering up a murder or even keeping her house. Maybe it's more personal than that. Maybe she just wants her boyfriend to be jealous."

Sean T. Collins of Decider wrote, "Look, I dress in all black all the time, it's tough to get me into stories about people who wear a lot of earth tones. Add pathos and dimension to the villains, add a massive injection of scorching sexual chemistry, add a touch of genuine mystery — not mysteriousness, mystery, in the religious sense — at the end, though? I am all in now."

Tori Preston of Pajiba wrote, "A big theme this week, or really every week on The Lowdown, is that people are never quite what they appear to be. The truth is always more complicated. Dale is an unreliable narrator. Betty Jo isn't a villain. Those poachers were poets! And even Allen, who very clearly is a murderer, wasn't necessarily all bad." Greg Wheeler of The Review Geek gave the episode a 3.5 out of 5 star rating and wrote, "It's not a bad episode, all things considered, and we do learn a good deal about the history this time. Hopefully we'll get more answers as the series progresses."

=== Accolades ===
TVLine named Jeanne Tripplehorn as an honorable mention for the "Performer of the Week" for the week of October 11, 2025, for her performance in the episode. The site wrote, "The Lowdown gave Jeanne Tripplehorn space to crack her character wide open as she unleashed grief-coated anger on Ethan Hawke's Lee. After calling him out for disrespecting her family, the actress layered Betty Jo with saucy mystery, as the characters slugged tequila and waxed poetic about their broken hearts. Tripplehorn transfixed us as she sensually whispered into Lee's ear before storming the karaoke stage. When the two lubricated new friends (frenemies?) headed back to Betty Jo's, the actress kicked her sex appeal into high gear, but not before pulling a loaded gun on Lee — as a joke! Terrifying for Lee, a hoot for us. The entire circus came to a head when B.J. revealed one heck of a shocker about the paternity of her daughter. It may have been an emotionally unstable rollercoaster ride for Betty Jo, but thanks to Tripplehorn's prowess, we had our arms raised to the sky on a ride we didn't want to get off."
