= The Devil's Mama =

- The Lowdown episode
- Episode no.: Season 1 Episode 2
- Directed by: Sterlin Harjo
- Written by: Sneha Koorse
- Cinematography by: Mark Schwartzbard
- Editing by: Patrick Tuck; David Chang
- Original air date: September 23, 2025
- Running time: 49 minutes

Guest appearances
- Kaniehtiio Horn as Samantha; Ryan Kiera Armstrong as Francis; Jeanne Tripplehorn as Betty Jo; Macon Blair as Dan Kane; Scott Shepherd as Allen Murphy; Tracy Letts as Frank Martin; Mike 'Killer Mike' Render as Cyrus; Rafael Casal as Johnny; Cody Lightning as Waylon; Andre Hyland as Shickford; Josh Fadem as Abel Belll; Dale Dickey as Bonnie; Eric Edelstein as Blackie; Mato Wayuhi as Chutto McIntosh; Kyle MacLachlan as Donald Washberg

Episode chronology
← Previous "Pilot"	Next → "Dinosaur Memories"

"The Devil's Mama" is the second episode of the American crime drama television series The Lowdown. The episode was written by co-executive producer Sneha Koorse and directed by series creator Sterlin Harjo, and aired on FX on September 23, 2025.

The series is set in Tulsa, Oklahoma, and follows self-styled "truthstorian" and bookseller Lee Raybon. As he struggles to form a steady relationship with his ex-wife and daughter, he begins to uncover a conspiracy revolving around a political candidate. In the episode, Lee uses the retrieved money, while trying to find the whereabouts of Allen Murphy.

According to Nielsen Media Research, the episode was seen by an estimated 0.175 million household viewers and gained a 0.02 ratings share among adults aged 18–49. The episode received highly positive reviews from critics, who praised its performances and writing.

== Plot ==
After cleaning himself at a gas station, a badly beaten Lee meets with his ex Samantha and her new boyfriend Johnny, using some of the skinhead's cash to pay her overdue child support. Samantha leaves Francis with Lee for the weekend, and he calls Akron to ask about Allen Murphy, but is told that he is an independent contractor.

Leaving Francis at the bookstore, Lee uses the cash to pay his clerk Deidra, and hires Deidra's recently paroled cousins Waylon and Henry to dispose of Blackie's car. The Tulsa Beat office has been vandalized by the skinheads, and Lee poses as a friend of Blackie to question his mother Bonnie. Her boyfriend Phil confirms that Blackie and Berta were working for Allen, a fellow racist ex-convict, who paid them for a job in Skiatook, where Dale lived.

Dale and Betty Jo's daughter Pearl returns home for Dale's funeral, with Akron executives and the local police in attendance. There, Marty finds Lee and admits that he is a private investigator, hired by Donald to follow Lee after he wrote about the Washbergs. In the restroom, Lee confronts Donald, who is displeased with his presence. When they return to the reception, Lee loudly accuses Donald of ordering his kidnapping and collaborating with the skinheads. Forced to take Lee outside, Marty asks him to not delve any further for his safety.

Waylon and Henry post a rap video of themselves burning the car, which garners hundreds of views. Lee returns to the bookstore, where he finds Allen waiting to question him about his investigation. As he leaves, Allen suggests a visit to one of his properties, where he warns that Lee "could get lost."

== Production ==
=== Development ===
In August 2025, FX announced that the second episode of the season would be titled "The Devil's Mama", and that it would be written by co-executive producer Sneha Koorse, and directed by series creator Sterlin Harjo. This marked Koorse's first writing credit, and Harjo's second directing credit.

=== Casting ===
The episode features a cameo appearance by Devery Jacobs, who reprises her role as Elora Danan Postoak from Reservation Dogs. She is seen in a make-up tutorial which Lee watches while tending his wounds.

== Reception ==
=== Viewers ===
In its original American broadcast on FX, "The Devil's Mama" was seen by an estimated 0.175 million household viewers with a 0.02 in the 18–49 demographics. This means that 0.02 percent of all households with televisions watched the episode. This was a 35% decrease in viewership from the previous episode, which was seen by an estimated 0.267 million household viewers with a 0.03 in the 18–49 demographics.

=== Critical reviews ===
"The Devil's Mama" received highly positive reviews from critics. Amanda Whitting of Vulture gave the episode a 4 star out of 5 rating and wrote, "Right now, I don't really care if Dale Washberg killed himself or if his wife did it or if his brother and his wife did it together. So far, the mystery that's driving The Lowdown is Lee."

Alan Sepinwall wrote, "We know Marty is working some kind of angle on behalf of Donald. We know that Lee is attempting to take down all of these people if he can. And we know that this character, and this show, are going to make that attempt a damned entertaining one." Sean T. Collins of Decider wrote, "If there's a rationale for the decision to air the first two episodes of The Lowdown back to back, I suspect it's this: They assumed people would just wanna spend some more time with this guy. I think they assumed correctly."

Kristian Lin of Show Snob wrote, "And now we know who the most dangerous person on the show is. Then again, maybe Lee could just tell Bonnie that Allen killed her son. She could give Allen something to remember her by. " Greg Wheeler of The Review Geek gave the episode a 3.5 out of 5 star rating and wrote, "With the investigation heating up, this episode slips into a more conventional feel and it's tonally a lot more consistent with smart dollops of humour around a gritty story and intriguing mystery."
