= Pilot (The Lowdown) =

- The Lowdown episode
- Episode no.: Season 1 Episode 1
- Directed by: Sterlin Harjo
- Written by: Sterlin Harjo
- Cinematography by: Adam Stone
- Editing by: Patrick Tuck
- Original air date: September 23, 2025
- Running time: 59 minutes

Guest appearances
- Kaniehtiio Horn as Samantha; Ryan Kiera Armstrong as Francis; Jeanne Tripplehorn as Betty Jo; Macon Blair as Dan Kane; Scott Shepherd as Allen Murphy; Tim Blake Nelson as Dale Washberg; Tracy Letts as Frank Martin; Michael Hitchcock as Ray; Mike 'Killer Mike' Render as Cyrus; Cody Lightning as Waylon; Abbie Cobb as Vicky Williams; Josh Fadem as Abel Belll; Eric Edelstein as Blackie; Johnny Pemberton as Berta; Zachary Booth as Elijah; Kyle MacLachlan as Donald Washberg

Episode chronology
← Previous —	Next → "The Devil's Mama"

"Pilot" is the series premiere of the American crime drama television series The Lowdown. The episode was written and directed by series creator Sterlin Harjo, and aired on FX on September 23, 2025.

The series is set in Tulsa, Oklahoma, and follows self-styled "truthstorian" and bookseller Lee Raybon. As he struggles to form a steady relationship with his ex-wife and daughter, he begins to uncover a conspiracy revolving around a political candidate.

According to Nielsen Media Research, the episode was seen by an estimated 0.267 million household viewers and gained a 0.03 ratings share among adults aged 18–49. The series premiere received critical acclaim, with critics praising its performances, dialogue, and directing.

== Plot ==
In Tulsa, Oklahoma, self-described "truthstorian" Lee Raybon attends a private club meeting with the Akron land development group, including executive Frank Martin and contractor Allen Murphy. Lee scolds Frank for buying up black-owned businesses in North Tulsa, and steals a Joe Brainard painting from the lobby.

Lee visits the office of the local Heartland Press magazine, which has recently published his article accusing the powerful Washberg family of corruption, especially Donald Washberg, who is campaigning for Governor of Oklahoma. In the wake of the article, Donald's brother Dale has been found dead of an apparent suicide, but Lee's editor Elijah is uninterested in a follow-up article or investigating Akron. At Sweet Emily's diner, Lee is approached by a stranger named Marty, who has read his columns but warns that there is still something missing. Returning home to the attic above his bookstore, Lee is attacked by skinheads Blackie and Berta for writing about their crimes.

Visiting the estate sale at Dale's ranch, Lee searches his office and finds a letter hidden by Dale. Lee is promptly kicked out by Dale's widow, Betty Jo, but takes the letter, which reveals that Dale hid more letters about a family conspiracy in his collection of Jim Thompson novels. Lee convinces antiques dealer Ray to acquire the collection for him in exchange for the stolen painting. Cyrus, editor of the Tulsa Beat tabloid, agrees to continue reporting on the skinheads and gives Lee a gun for protection.

Lee takes his daughter Francis to a livestock auction, where he notices Donald is unusually close with Betty Jo, suspecting they are having an affair. Blackie and Berta kidnap Lee, locking him in Blackie's trunk and driving him to Allen, who leads them to a bridge. Allen shoots the skinheads dead, dumps their bodies in the river, and leaves, unaware that Lee is in the trunk. Marty, who has been following Lee, arrives and releases him. Unwilling to trust Marty, an erratic and bloodied Lee escapes in Blackie's car. Driving off, he is surprised to find an envelope of cash.

== Production ==
=== Development ===
In August 2025, FX announced that the first episode of the season would be titled "Pilot", and that it would be written and directed by series creator Sterlin Harjo, marking his first credits for the series.

=== Writing ===
Questioned over Lee's self-proclaimed "trustorian" title, Sterlin Harjo explained, "As I was trying to define what he is in a Lee way, I came upon truthstorian — it just kind of popped in my head. I was like, ‘That's ridiculous, but it would be really funny if he said that and kind of is working through it and doesn't know if it sounds great.’ But it is close to what he is. It's about looking into the past and the present and the future, and [figuring out] what is the truth that connects all of these things."

Ethan Hawke said that Lee is always physically attacked in his search for answers, "Well, it's part of the fun of being in a crime noir. If you're the lead character in a crime noir, it means you're seeking the truth, and it means you're going to get punched in the face." Harjo further added, "He's somehow managed to balance having this superstar career, basically, with also an independent career and perspective as well. He's never really lost himself, you know? It doesn't feel like you can't reach out and touch Ethan Hawke, and that's what you need in a noir. You know? They have to represent us."

=== Casting ===
The episode features a guest appearance by Paulina Alexis, who reprises her role as Willie Jack from Reservation Dogs. She is seen in the opening introduction to Lee, who walks past her. Alexis was in Tulsa, Oklahoma on a road trip, and Harjo asked her to come to the set to make a cameo in the scene, saying "It was a really poignant, beautiful moment, this meaningful thing for me. Reservation Dogs really is what leveled me up and got me here, and I want to honor that." He added, "It became this idea of — just give him the handoff, we'll give him a nod as you walk by. It worked out so beautifully. It was good fortune. It wasn't planned."

== Reception ==
=== Viewers ===
In its original American broadcast on FX, "Pilot" was seen by an estimated 0.267 million household viewers with a 0.03 in the 18–49 demographics. This means that 0.03 percent of all households with televisions watched the episode.

=== Critical reviews ===
"Pilot" received critical acclaim. Amanda Whitting of Vulture gave the episode a perfect 5 star out of 5 rating and wrote, "Mysteries are unraveled at the pace of the person doing the unraveling, and Hawke's showy performance as Lee Raybon — a down-on-his-luck writer whose default setting is “go” — makes sense of the show's urgency. It's perhaps the most fully realized pilot I've seen all year."

Alan Sepinwall wrote, "It arrives fully-formed, in complete command of its tone, its look, and even its story — at least, to the extent that any kind of noir, comedic or otherwise, expects you to be able to follow the plot. I came to the end of the first episode giddy that the second one was immediately available to me." Sean T. Collins of Decider wrote, "Based on its pilot episode, The Lowdown is The Big Lebowski if real criminals were involved, instead of just a bunch of weirdos and doofuses scrambling for cash between bowling games, porn shoots, and visits from Knox Harrington (the video artist)."

Kristian Lin of Show Snob wrote, "So far, I'm interested in this version of Tulsa that I've been introduced to. I wonder how the Akron Construction Group and the Bootboys fit in with the Washbergs." Greg Wheeler of The Review Geek gave the episode a 3 out of 5 star rating and wrote, "Overall, there’s enough here to whet the appetite, leaving everything hanging in the balance for the next chapter."
