= The Sensitive Kind =

- The Lowdown episode
- Episode no.: Season 1 Episode 8
- Directed by: Sterlin Harjo
- Written by: Sterlin Harjo; Liz Blood
- Cinematography by: Christopher Norr
- Editing by: Patrick Tuck
- Original air date: November 4, 2025
- Running time: 54 minutes

Guest appearances
- Kaniehtiio Horn as Samantha; Ryan Kiera Armstrong as Francis; Jeanne Tripplehorn as Betty Jo; Macon Blair as Dan Kane; Tim Blake Nelson as Dale Washberg; Tracy Letts as Frank Martin; Paul Sparks as Pastor Mark Sternwick; Michael Hitchcock as Ray; Mike 'Killer Mike' Render as Cyrus; Rafael Casal as Johnny; Tisha Campbell as Odette; Dale Dickey as Bonnie; Cody Lightning as Waylon; Mato Wayuhi as Chutto McIntosh; Eric Edelstein as Blackie; Johnny Pemberton as Berta; Tom McCarthy as Trip; Josh Fadem as Abel Bell; Kyle MacLachlan as Donald Washberg

Episode chronology
| ← Previous "Tulsa Turnaround" | Next → "The Rupidoop" |

"The Sensitive Kind" is the eighth episode and season finale of the American crime drama television series The Lowdown. The episode was written by series creator Sterlin Harjo and Liz Blood, and directed by Harjo. It originally aired on FX on November 4, 2025.

The series is set in Tulsa, Oklahoma, and follows self-styled "truthstorian" and bookseller Lee Raybon. As he struggles to form a steady relationship with his ex-wife and daughter, he begins to uncover a conspiracy revolving around a political candidate. In the episode, Lee and Marty try to confront Donald for the recent events, while Betty Jo reveals her true nature to Lee.

According to Nielsen Media Research, the episode was seen by an estimated 0.187 million household viewers and gained a 0.02 ratings share among adults aged 18–49. The episode received highly positive reviews from critics, who praised its closure to the story arcs, performances and directing.

== Plot ==
One year prior, Dale visits Lee at the bookstore. He buys a novel, and expresses curiosity with Lee proclaiming himself as a "truthstorian". As he exits, he quotes a phrase from Jim Thompson, believing that things are not what they seem.

In the present day, Marty retrieves Lee from the church by pretending to be a federal agent. Pastor Mark sends gunmen at them, and while they flee, Marty is wounded in the leg. They break into a feed store to treat him, with Lee giving him cow medicine. As he brings him to the bookstore to recover, Chutto throws a brick at the window. He blames Lee for Arthur's death, and reveals that neither he nor Arthur wanted the land. The following day, Lee attends Francis's poetry reading, where he exclaims he is proud of her. He is also informed by Marty that Frank will not be charged, as they had staged the scene to make it look like an accident.

Lee confronts Betty Jo at the Philbrook Museum of Art, but she does not want to accept responsibility for the events. Marty drives Donald to a restaurant, but instead takes him to a different location, meeting Lee face to face. Lee presents Donald with the truth: conspiring with Betty Jo, Frank instructed Allen to intimidate Dale into agreeing to the land sale; Allen hired the skinheads, who accidentally shot Dale instead, and Betty Jo staged his suicide. Through their actions, they made it look like Donald could be bribed. Shocked by the reveal, Donald agrees to help Lee.

At a ceremony, Donald cuts ties with The 46 and publicly honors Dale's gift of the Washbergs' land to Chutto, who gives it to the Osage Nation. Donald is elected governor, and Lee publishes another article in Dale's memory, while Mark and his associates are arrested, and Bonnie guns down Frank to avenge her son. Lee attends Samantha's wedding, giving them the stolen Joe Brainard painting, with Francis assuring him that he is a good man. When his van breaks down, Lee returns to the bookstore on foot, inviting Waylon and Henry to join him. Elsewhere, Betty Jo gives a tearful barroom performance of "Luckenbach, Texas".

== Production ==
=== Development ===
In October 2025, FX announced that the eighth episode of the season would be titled "The Sensitive Kind", and that it would be written by series creator Sterlin Harjo and Liz Blood, and directed by Harjo. This marked Harjo's second writing credit, Blood's first writing credit, and Harjo's fourth directing credit.

=== Writing ===
Sterlin Harjo said that Lee's decision to scrap the exposé and instead publish a tribute to Dale was based on his motivation, "The conflict in the end sort of goes directly against what [Lee]'s been saying this whole time, which is: I'm a truthstorian. He's faced with this dilemma and trying to figure out, how does he make this wrong right? And in the end, a dead man's wishes that are kind of pure, like the most pure — for Lee, that beats telling the exact truth, which is something that he's willing to risk his life for, and also bring danger upon those that love him. He's put everything at risk for the truth. And at the end, it's like, well, can you put your morals, can you put your ego aside for the truth? That's what he does in the end, to right this wrong and to fulfill this dead man’s wish. He pivots."

On Lee's decision to let Francis live full-time with her mother, Ethan Hawke explained, "in a way, it's a mark of wisdom, and in another way, it's really disappointing to her. She wants to be loved wholly and completely and blindly. And I think the feeling I get from that last scene is that they're going to find their way, but I would love to do a second season just because her character's getting to be a really interesting age and her problems are going to get more complicated. It'd be wonderful to see Lee try to parent a teenage daughter."

One of the first scenes in the episode, where Lee tries to tend a wounded Marty at a feed store, was inspired by a trip between Harjo and Robert Plant to the Tallgrass Prairie Preserve. Plant related that a member of Led Zeppelin consumed bovine vagina relaxant pills before a concert, and this inspired Harjo to include a reference in the episode. He said, "There's just something about Keith David frustrated and cursing. That is some of the funniest things. He's got the best line readings of anyone when he's cursing, I believe. It was one of my favorite days of shooting." Hawke noted that his scenes with Marty were fun to film, "That's when I just couldn't keep a straight face."

The final scene, showing Betty Jo singing in a bar, was originally written for another episode, but Harjo felt that "it ended up not working in that part." But he felt it was important to include it, "Betty Jo gets away, but internally, she doesn't, and I needed to show that. She's back in her spot, and she's trying to be the rodeo queen still, but she can't help but feel the undercurrent beneath the words she's singing. It's funny, it's sad, it's beautiful, it's heartbreaking. And that's the show, you know?"

== Reception ==
=== Viewers ===
In its original American broadcast, "The Sensitive Kind" was seen by an estimated 0.187 million household viewers with a 0.02 in the 18–49 demographics. This means that 0.02 percent of all households with televisions watched the episode. This was a slight increase in viewership from the previous episode, which was seen by an estimated 0.166 million household viewers with a 0.03 in the 18–49 demographics.

=== Critical reviews ===
"The Sensitive Kind" received highly positive reviews from critics. Saloni Gajjar of The A.V. Club wrote, "On a micro level, is this Donald's blatant bid to secure votes without the specter of Frank and his associates over his head? Yes. But on a macro level, Harjo and the show's writers' room reflect on centuries of trauma, resilience, and kinship of the Indigenous community."

Amanda Whitting of Vulture gave the episode a 4 star out of 5 rating and wrote, "The finale suggests that he's the tissue that will connect season one to The Lowdown's Chapter 2, provided the series is justly renewed. This makes perfect sense to me. My appetite for more Lee is low, but Harjo's Tulsa — cynical and lively at the same time — simmers with more to say."

Judy Berman of TIME wrote, "I came out of The Lowdown not just persuaded, but also moved by Harjo's case for “the sensitive kind.” The evil of plunderous bigots, whether they happen to be the so-called pioneers of centuries past or the white separatist fanatics of today, may be eternal — but so is goodness." Sean T. Collins of Decider wrote, "Wow. Wow. It's a pretty good sign for a season finale when you have to repeat the word “wow” for emphasis to describe it, right? But I don't know how else to put it. This episode of The Lowdown, by my estimation, contains one of the year's funniest scenes and one of the year's most ruthless and unflinching endings."

Tori Preston of Pajiba wrote, "It's a tidy ending, tied up far neater than I expected, but it was satisfying precisely because it cut its optimism with the same messy, complicated humanity the show has always run on." Greg Wheeler of The Review Geek gave the episode a 3 star out of 5 rating and wrote, "So The Lowdown rolls round with a finale that finally sheds light on everything that's been happening and wraps the case up with a neat little bow. Turns out they didn't need the Will after all. Lee just needed a sit-down with Donald to turn him around."
