= This Land? =

- The Lowdown episode
- Episode no.: Season 1 Episode 5
- Directed by: Macon Blair
- Written by: Olivia Purnell
- Cinematography by: Christopher Norr
- Editing by: Dane McMaster
- Original air date: October 14, 2025
- Running time: 49 minutes

Guest appearances
- Ryan Kiera Armstrong as Francis; Peter Dinklage as Wendell; Jeanne Tripplehorn as Betty Jo; Scott Shepherd as Allen Murphy; Tracy Letts as Frank Martin; Paul Sparks as Pastor Mark; Tisha Campbell as Odette; Cody Lightning as Waylon; Abbie Cobb as Vicky Williams; Tom McCarthy; Andre Hyland as Shickford; Kyle MacLachlan as Donald Washberg

Episode chronology
← Previous "Short on Cowboys"	Next → "Old Indian Trick"

"This Land?" is the fifth episode of the American crime drama television series The Lowdown. The episode was written by co-producer Olivia Purnell and directed by Macon Blair, and aired on FX on October 14, 2025.

The series is set in Tulsa, Oklahoma, and follows self-styled "truthstorian" and bookseller Lee Raybon. As he struggles to form a steady relationship with his ex-wife and daughter, he begins to uncover a conspiracy revolving around a political candidate. In the episode, Lee reunites with an old friend, Wendell, and they decide to investigate together the land that Donald was talking about, while Donald confronts Betty Jo over her night with Lee.

According to Nielsen Media Research, the episode was seen by an estimated 0.254 million household viewers and gained a 0.02 ratings share among adults aged 18–49. The episode received mostly positive reviews from critics, with Peter Dinklage earning high praise for his guest appearance.

== Plot ==
Lee is awakened by Francis, who informs him that Allen was murdered in the street, but he refuses to let her get involved and takes her back to school. Returning to the bookstore, he finds his estranged friend Wendell, the store's former co-owner, who reminds Lee of the "sacred pact" they made to honor their late friend Jesús once a year. Deducing that Lee is investigating Donald, Wendell bets that he can find the land Dale and Donald argued about within two hours.

Wendell charms a county clerk for help with public records, and they track down the Washbergs' acreage in Indian Head Hills. There, Wendell comes to blows with Lee, blaming him for Jesús's fatal overdose, but they escape when armed men arrive. Vicky discovers the land is being sold at an overinflated value, which Lee suspects is essentially a bribe to Donald. A furious Donald confronts Betty Jo over her night with Lee, but she maintains she did not tell him anything. Akron executive Frank Martin invites Donald to a meeting of fellow white businessmen working to seize power from Native Americans. While some have doubts over Donald's long-term prospects, he maintains that it will all work out.

Waylon and Henry's video draws Phil and his fellow skinheads to the bookstore, but Henry scares them off. Ignoring urgent calls from Donald, Marty enjoys a blind date and agrees to join Donald's staff. Betty Jo tells Lee that Donald took Dale's gun, and Lee sends her to lay low at a "self-care retreat". Honoring Jesús's memory, Lee and Wendell agree to repair their friendship. While Pearl performs music at a club, Lee warns her that her mother is in hiding, but he is seized by local police officers who have been harassing him. Dragged to their car, Lee is driven to a debauched, explosive party full of fellow officers to meet with Donald.

== Production ==
=== Development ===
In September 2025, FX announced that the fifth episode of the season would be titled "This Land?", and that it would be written by co-producer Olivia Purnell, and directed by Macon Blair. This marked Purnell's first writing credit, and Blair's second directing credit.

=== Casting ===
Peter Dinklage guest stars in the episode, playing the role of Wendell, an old friend of Lee. Dinklage was a fan of Reservation Dogs and accepted the guest role when Sterlin Harjo and Ethan Hawke offered it to him, with Harjo remarking "It's been a dream to work with Peter for a long time, and when dreaming of the story of the season... [I] brought the character up to Ethan, Peter's name came out, and it became more solidified and inspired when his name came up. They have such a history together."

== Reception ==
=== Viewers ===
In its original American broadcast on FX, "This Land?" was seen by an estimated 0.254 million household viewers with a 0.02 in the 18–49 demographics. This means that 0.02 percent of all households with televisions watched the episode. This was a 41% increase in viewership from the previous episode, which was seen by an estimated 0.180 million household viewers with a 0.02 in the 18–49 demographics.

=== Critical reviews ===
"This Land?" received mostly positive reviews from critics. Amanda Whitting of Vulture gave the episode a 4 star out of 5 rating and wrote, "It seems obvious that the man bathed in the sinister red light of refracted explosions at the end of “This Land?” — presumed Governor Donald Washberg — is behind it all. So obvious, in fact, that he probably isn't behind it all. But even if “the candidate in the study with the revolver” isn't the winning accusation, Donald's so odious that it's hard to imagine loathing the real triggerman more. Even if he's not our killer, this man is our villain. As such, the engine of each episode isn't Lee's progress toward identifying Donald, it's the friends he makes and loses along the way."

Sean T. Collins of Decider wrote, "I've watched enough TV with stacked casts this year to know talent alone can't make a show good. That said, you really do have to try to screw up an episode that rests on the charms of Ethan Hawke, Peter Dinklage, Jeanne Tripplehorne, Kyle MacLachlan, Keith David, and Tisha Campbell. Those are some charming people! As a result, The Lowdown is a charming show." Tori Preston of Pajiba wrote, "Hardly what I was expecting when Dinklage's Wendell first emerged from stinking up Lee's bathroom, but I should have figured The Lowdown would find a way to continue topping itself with another episode that blows the previous ones out of the water."

=== Accolades ===
TVLine named Peter Dinklage as the "Performer of the Week" for the week of October 18, 2025, for his performance in the episode. The site wrote, "As the actor spoke — about how celebrating their friend's birthday was his character's "north star" — our hearts sunk. Because even though they were coming clean with each other, we could tell there was a stockpile of unspoken tragedy we weren't privy to, thanks to Dinklage's precise diction and facial expressions. "We're too f—ked up to be whole," Wendell said with a half-hearted chuckle. When the two parted ways, they agreed to hang out soon, "like normal people." And should The Lowdown return for Season 2, we hope Dinklage is at the top of creator Sterlin Harjo's call list."
