= Dinosaur Memories =

- The Lowdown episode
- Episode no.: Season 1 Episode 3
- Directed by: Sterlin Harjo
- Written by: Scott Teems
- Cinematography by: Mark Schwartzbard
- Editing by: Patrick Tuck
- Original air date: September 30, 2025
- Running time: 46 minutes

Guest appearances
- Ryan Kiera Armstrong as Francis; Jeanne Tripplehorn as Betty Jo; Scott Shepherd as Allen Murphy; Tim Blake Nelson as Dale Washberg; Michael Hitchcock as Ray; Abbie Cobb as Vicky Williams; Cody Lightning as Waylon; John Doe as Marlon; Robert Peters as Hook; Flavia Carbone as Catalina Estragon; Kyle MacLachlan as Donald Washberg

Episode chronology
← Previous "The Devil's Mama"	Next → "Short on Cowboys"

"Dinosaur Memories" is the third episode of the American crime drama television series The Lowdown. The episode was written by consulting producer Scott Teems and directed by series creator Sterlin Harjo, and aired on FX on September 30, 2025.

The series is set in Tulsa, Oklahoma, and follows self-styled "truthstorian" and bookseller Lee Raybon. As he struggles to form a steady relationship with his ex-wife and daughter, he begins to uncover a conspiracy revolving around a political candidate. In the episode, Lee tries to retrieve Dale's novels from an antiques dealer, while Marty receives a new offer.

According to Nielsen Media Research, the episode was seen by an estimated 0.303 million household viewers and gained a 0.06 ratings share among adults aged 18–49. The episode received mostly positive reviews from critics, who praised its writing, humor and character development.

== Plot ==
Lee takes Francis to see a new house with real estate agent Vicky, fearing his investigation is putting his daughter in danger, and agrees to rent the property. Lee and Francis track down Ray, who admits that Dale's novels were brought by rival antiques dealer Catalina, and takes them to find her at Keystone Lake.

Lee goes alone to Catalina's houseboat, posing as a Fish and Wildlife officer, but is knocked unconscious and taken to the woods by her estranged husband Marlon and his brother Hook, part of a group of poachers selling paddlefish eggs as beluga caviar. Marlon forces him to tell them a story to fully earn their trust, and Lee opens up about landing in jail and that his daughter is everything he has left, earning his freedom after writing Marlon a poem for Catalina.

Marty meets with Donald, who proposes making him the head of his security detail in exchange for informing Betty Jo that her prenup allows Donald to seize Dale's ranch. Marty reluctantly presents an outraged Betty Jo with $10,000 from Donald, which she refuses. At the diner, Marty is questioned by Allen about Lee's investigation, but refuses to divulge any information.

Leaving Ray at a nearby restaurant, Francis sneaks onto the houseboat but is caught by Catalina. Francis steals the novels, but she and Ray are confronted by Catalina, who ignores their pleas and burns the books out of spite. Lee is devastated, until Francis reveals she was able to save Dale's mysterious letters, and they drive a drunken Ray home.

== Production ==
=== Development ===
In September 2025, FX announced that the third episode of the season would be titled "Dinosaur Memories", and that it would be written by consulting producer Scott Teems, and directed by series creator Sterlin Harjo. This marked Teems' first writing credit, and Harjo's third directing credit.

=== Writing ===
Sterlin Harjo explained the relationship of Lee and Francis in the episode, "It's just a realistic look at fatherhood. You'll see a lot of shows where the kids [show up] once every six episodes, and they'll just be home for dinner. It doesn't affect the character's lives somehow, it's like, no, it's a struggle doing what you're doing, and especially if you're financially strapped and trying to tell the truth, and your endeavors aren't gonna make you rich."

== Reception ==
=== Viewers ===
In its original American broadcast on FX, "Dinosaur Memories" was seen by an estimated 0.303 million household viewers with a 0.06 in the 18–49 demographics. This means that 0.06 percent of all households with televisions watched the episode. This was a 73% increase in viewership from the previous episode, which was seen by an estimated 0.175 million household viewers with a 0.02 in the 18–49 demographics.

=== Critical reviews ===
"Dinosaur Memories" received mostly positive reviews from critics. Amanda Whitting of Vulture gave the episode a 4 star out of 5 rating and wrote, "On The Lowdown, the action picks up where it left off last week, and characters drift in and out of Lee's story, freed from the burden of an arc. The looseness (so far) works for me, because Lee Raybon's fast days don't end. His misadventures crash into one another. His problems accumulate. His arc is crescendoing chaos."

Sean T. Collins of Decider wrote, "Watching those two guys run around doing mystery stuff in this fun little episode, it hit me again what a cool business this can be."

Tori Preston of Pajiba wrote, "After last week's frenzied two-part premiere, The Lowdown is finally settling into its natural storytelling pace." Greg Wheeler of The Review Geek gave the episode a 3 out of 5 star rating and wrote, "The Lowdown continues to deliver decent drama, even if it's not quite doing enough to stand out from the masses of other shows in this field."
