= Old Indian Trick =

- The Lowdown episode
- Episode no.: Season 1 Episode 6
- Directed by: Danis Goulet
- Written by: Jason Sack
- Cinematography by: Mark Schwartzbard
- Editing by: Gina Sandom; Patrick Tuck
- Original air date: October 21, 2025
- Running time: 50 minutes

Guest appearances
- Kaniehtiio Horn as Samantha; Jeanne Tripplehorn as Betty Jo; Tim Blake Nelson as Dale Washberg; Tracy Letts as Frank Martin; Paul Sparks as Pastor Mark Sternwick; Graham Greene as Arthur; Cody Lightning as Waylon; Mato Wayuhi as Chutto Mackintosh; Tom McCarthy as Trip; Eric Edelstein as Blackie; Johnny Pemberton as Berta; Andre Hyland as Shickford; Kyle MacLachlan as Donald Washberg

Episode chronology
← Previous "This Land?"	Next → "Tulsa Turnaround"

"Old Indian Trick" is the sixth episode of the American crime drama television series The Lowdown. The episode was written by producer Jason Sack, and directed by Danis Goulet, and aired on FX on October 21, 2025.

The series is set in Tulsa, Oklahoma, and follows self-styled "truthstorian" and bookseller Lee Raybon. As he struggles to form a steady relationship with his ex-wife and daughter, he begins to uncover a conspiracy revolving around a political candidate. In the episode, Lee tries to find a street artist connected to Dale, while Donald meets with his partners to proceed with his plan.

The episode received positive reviews from critics, who praised the performances, writing and cliffhanger.

== Plot ==
Donald punches Lee for sleeping with Betty Jo, and warns him to stop investigating any further, believing that Dale was manipulated into killing himself by a street artist. His security detail drop Lee off in the city, forcing him to make his way to the bookstore on foot. Inside, he finds Samantha, who has called off her engagement with Johnny. Though she and Lee drunkenly reminisce and even kiss, Samantha leaves ashamed.

With Deidra's help, Lee visits Native stores and the local Indian Center in search of the mysterious artist. Giving away a ribbon shirt, they track down the artist, Chutto Mackintosh, who lives with his grandfather Arthur, whose health is deteriorating. Arthur confuses Lee for Dale, and Chutto explains that he met Dale while selling his drawings outside a gay nightclub; Dale was too afraid to go inside, but became infatuated with Chutto and soon befriended Arthur, spending a great deal of time together.

Donald meets Pastor Mark Sternwick, a member of Frank's sinister coalition, The 46, and realizes Mark's "One Well" church is behind the purchase of the Washbergs' land arranged by Akron. Frank is threatened to uphold the land sale by Mark and his heavily armed confederates, including the one-eyed gunman, having killed Allen and disposing of Blackie and Berta's bodies to protect their plan to build a white nationalist "homeland."

Chutto and Arthur reveal that they have Dale's handwritten will, which relinquishes his share of the Washbergs' land in Indian Head Hills and bequeaths it to them. The acreage now being sold by Donald originally belonged to Arthur's grandfather, who was murdered by white men to steal the land. Despite Lee's offer to help, Chutto does not believe they stand a chance against Donald. After Lee calls Betty Joe to inform her about the will, she immediately calls Frank.

== Production ==
=== Development ===
In September 2025, FX announced that the sixth episode of the season would be titled "Old Indian Trick", and that it would be written by producer Jason Sack, and directed by Danis Goulet. This marked Sack's first writing credit, and Goulet's first directing credit.

=== Casting ===
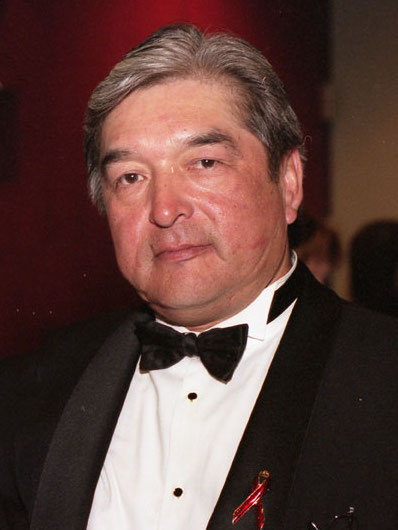
The episode features Graham Greene, in one of his final performances before his death in September 2025.

Graham Greene guest stars in the episode, which was broadcast just one month after his death in September 2025. The episode was filmed in May 2025, and Ethan Hawke said that his "health seemed great when we were working together." Series creator Sterlin Harjo added, "He was a legendary person for a lot of us, especially Native storytellers and filmmakers, and he was a joy to have on set. He did an amazing job." The episode was dedicated to his memory.

== Reception ==
"Old Indian Trick" received positive reviews from critics. Amanda Whitting of Vulture gave the episode a 3 star out of 5 rating and wrote, "Despite the episode's big reveals — and there are more than just the existence of a second will — “Old Indian Trick” doesn't hum with the same frenzied energy as The Lowdown's previous installments, which relied on playful antagonism between Lee and whomever he's roped into helping him. This week, though, Lee enlists Deidra, a bookshop employee whose only real problem with Lee is that he's low-key uncool. [...] The end result is that no one dislikes him, and Lee's day passes without much friction, which doesn't make for blistering TV."

Sean T. Collins of Decider wrote, "Watching this episode in October 2025, when there are open Nazis and Christian Nationalists at the highest levels of government and the rule of law is being rewritten to favor white people and punish everyone else more or less openly, is... bittersweet. Nevertheless, it is bracing and necessary for art to address these people for who and what they are." Tori Preston of Pajiba wrote, "So maybe Betty Jo is our femme fatale after all! What I wanna know is, did Lee tell her because he trusts her, or did he tell her because he doesn't and now all he needs to do is keep an eye on Chutto's apartment and see who comes sniffing around? With only two more episodes left in the season, we won't have to wait long to see how this mystery shakes out - and who's left standing when it does."
