= Tulsa Turnaround =

- The Lowdown episode
- Episode no.: Season 1 Episode 7
- Directed by: Danis Goulet
- Written by: Walter Mosley
- Cinematography by: Mark Schwartzbard
- Editing by: Gina Sansom
- Original air date: October 28, 2025
- Running time: 40 minutes

Guest appearances
- Kaniehtiio Horn as Samantha; Ryan Kiera Armstrong as Francis; Jeanne Tripplehorn as Betty Jo; Macon Blair as Dan Kane; Tracy Letts as Frank Martin; Paul Sparks as Pastor Mark Sternwick; Michael Hitchcock as Ray; Mike 'Killer Mike' Render as Cyrus; Rafael Casal as Johnny; Graham Greene as Arthur; Zachary Booth as Elijah; Kerry Malloy as Phil; Tom McCarthy as Trip; Casey Camp-Horinek as Irene; Derrick J. Haywood as Daymond Brown; Kyle MacLachlan as Donald Washberg

Episode chronology
← Previous "Old Indian Trick"	Next → "The Sensitive Kind"

"Tulsa Turnaround" is the seventh episode of the American crime drama television series The Lowdown. The episode was written by consulting producer Walter Mosley, and directed by Danis Goulet, and aired on FX on October 28, 2025.

The series is set in Tulsa, Oklahoma, and follows self-styled "truthstorian" and bookseller Lee Raybon. As he struggles to form a steady relationship with his ex-wife and daughter, he begins to uncover a conspiracy revolving around a political candidate. In the episode, Lee tries to help Arthur and Chutto with legal help to reclaim the land, but Frank is aware of his plan. Meanwhile, Marty realizes the extent of One Well's intentions.

According to Nielsen Media Research, the episode was seen by an estimated 0.166 million household viewers and gained a 0.03 ratings share among adults aged 18–49. The episode received positive reviews from critics, with Ethan Hawke earning high praise for his performance in the episode.

== Plot ==
Mark preaches to his congregation of fellow ex-convicts and white supremacists, promising that they will see a better future for themselves. Meanwhile, Donald takes part in a reenactment of the Land Rush of 1889, but is interrupted by protestors. He is scolded for dressing as Will Rogers, and the event is called out for whitewashing the real event.

After introducing him to a cousin attorney to help Will and Chutto, Cyrus provides Lee with another gun. Racing to his daughter's parent-teacher conference, Lee is humiliated to discover Samantha has reconciled with Johnny, but Francis is hurt that Lee's truth-seeking crusade keeps him from showing up for her. Uncovering One Well's plans for their racially exclusive "Adonai City", Marty rescues Phil, who has been tarred and feathered by the church, and warns Lee.

Betty Jo meets with Frank and provides him information over Arthur's ownership and Dale's will, in exchange for money. Frank visits Arthur at his house, wanting to pay him for the will. Realizing Frank will push him for the location, Arthur retrieves a gun but fights with him. When Lee arrives with Marty, they are shocked to find Arthur dead and Frank fleeing in his car with the will. They chase him in Lee's van and they get near him, but the van breaks down. Angered over the events, Lee leaves a voicemail to Betty Jo to reprimand her for her actions.

Destroying the will, Frank becomes distraught over killing Arthur and flees to One Well. Despite Marty's protests, Lee interrupts Mark's sermon to hold Frank at gunpoint. Attempting a citizen's arrest, Lee declares Frank a murderer and ignites an armed standoff.

== Production ==
=== Development ===
In September 2025, FX announced that the seventh episode of the season would be titled "Tulsa Turnaround", and that it would be written by consulting producer Walter Mosley, and directed by Danis Goulet. This marked Mosley's first writing credit, and Goulet's second directing credit.

=== Writing ===
Tracy Letts said that Frank's actions are a result of his pressure of dealing with Pastor Mark, "Obviously, when you encounter people who are ideologically scary. They're really capable of anything because of ideological beliefs. And so yeah, it's particularly motivating, I think, for Frank." He also said that Frank killing Arthur depicting him as distraught, "Frank is a guy who might push a button on a guy, but he's not a guy who's going to get his hands dirty, typically in those situations."

== Reception ==
=== Viewers ===
In its original American broadcast, "Tulsa Turnaround" was seen by an estimated 0.166 million household viewers with a 0.03 in the 18–49 demographics. This means that 0.03 percent of all households with televisions watched the episode.

=== Critical reviews ===
"Tulsa Turnaround" received positive reviews from critics. Amanda Whitting of Vulture gave the episode a 3 star out of 5 rating and wrote, "In lieu of major resolutions that could diminish the impact of the season finale, the loose ends of less important storylines get tied up, often to underwhelming effect. To some extent, these pitfalls are unavoidable. But “Tulsa Turnaround” suffers from a bigger problem: It just doesn't feel like the next episode in the series we've been watching. Characters make incomprehensible choices. They interact in ways that don’t make sense. I suspected I was watching an episode that had been reverse-engineered from a predetermined finale rather than an episode that followed inevitably from what we’d just seen."

Sean T. Collins of Decider wrote, "The Lowdown is the most fun show going during a bleak season for America, but that doesn't mean it isn't often bleak itself. That bleakness has picked up a great deal since last week's introduction of Pastor Mark, played with genuine menace and mania by the great Paul Sparks. This white supremacist is secretly the whole season's Big Bad and — as the previously presumed Big Bad, Frank White, puts it in this episode — “crazier than a shithouse rat.” But his kind of crazy runs the country now."

Tori Preston of Pajiba wrote, "I admire the way The Lowdown has blended a sort of cozy, throwback noir with this examination of the cycles of greed and bigotry in America, but perhaps it has done its job too well. When the smartest characters on the show say the struggle is hopeless, and your hero is a selfish buffoon with pretensions, it's hard to see what outcome makes sense here when the stakes are so high." Greg Wheeler of The Review Geek gave the episode a 3.5 star out of 5 rating and wrote, "The cliffhanger is a big talking point, and it'll be interesting to see how that develops. I'm more concerned for Marty's wellbeing though and as a Black man surrounded by people driven by racial paranoia, things could easily take a darker turn."

=== Accolades ===
TVLine named Ethan Hawke the "Performer of the Week" for the week of November 1, 2025, for his performance in the episode. The site wrote, "Hawke switched gears to raging fury after discovering that Betty Jo's loose lips led to Arthur's murder. The actor's wild man grew even wilder as he unleashed on his former fling's voicemail. It all culminated in a showdown with the murderer at a church where Lee pulled a gun on, well, the entire parish. To outsiders, he may simply look like a maniacal townie. A mere opportunist, even. But thanks to Hawke's steady hand, Lee has become one of our favorite new characters of the TV season, one whose rough-around-the-edges approach often overshadows his kind, altruistic heart. And that's the truth."
