= The Rupidoop =

- The Lowdown episode
- Episode no.: Season 2 Episode 1
- Directed by: Sterlin Harjo
- Written by: Sterlin Harjo
- Cinematography by: Mark Schwartzbard
- Editing by: Patrick Tuck
- Original air date: October 14, 2026
- Running time: 52 minutes

Guest appearances
- Macon Blair as Dan Kane; Michael Hitchcock as Ray; Rafael Casal as Johnny; Mike 'Killer Mike' Render as Cyrus; Austin Amelio as Lonnie Reed; Zachary Booth as Elijah; Abbie Cobb as Vickey Williams; Siena East as Deidra; Josh Fadem as Abel Bell; Derrick Haywood as Daymond; Andre Hyland as Shickford; Cody Lightning as Waylon; Shane McRae as McMann; Richard Robichaux as Lane Singleton; Eddie Spears as Mekko Dean

Episode chronology
← Previous "The Sensitive Kind"	Next → "Whiskey Bent and Hell Bound"

"The Rupidoop" is the first episode of the second season of the American crime drama television series The Lowdown. It is the ninth overall episode of the series and was written and directed by series creator Sterlin Harjo. It originally aired on FX on October 14, 2026.

The series is set in Tulsa, Oklahoma, and follows self-styled "truthstorian" and bookseller Lee Raybon. As he struggles to form a steady relationship with his ex-wife and daughter, he gets involved in plots revolving around people in the city. In the episode, Lee accepts a journalism award, and becomes interested in a public defender who claims is being stalked.

The episode received highly positive reviews from critics, who praised the addition of Betty Gilpin (as Ginger) and Tommy Lee Jones (as Lee Raybon Sr.) to the series, and highlighting Hawke's performance.

== Plot ==
In the outskirts of Tulsa, a tribal police officer finds an elderly man wandering towards Tulsa. He offers to give him a ride, with the man identifying himself as Lee Raybon Sr.

In Tulsa, Lee receives the "Citizen Journalist of the Year" award in the local Broadcast and Journalism Awards. However, he is intoxicated when receiving the award, and uses the opportunity to insult the crowd, embarrassing his daughter Francis in attendance. At the bar, he meets public defender Ginger, who actually liked his speech. She believes there are two men stalking her, and Lee notes a Neo-Nazi tattoo on the neck of one of them. She leaves, giving Lee a kiss before departing. Lee is then punched by men whom he insulted during the speech.

The following day, Lee visits Ginger at her office. After hesitating over getting him involved, she explains that she is being followed after her incarcerated client, Mekko Dean, lost contact with her after the guards at Boontill Prison refused to let her talk to him. Convincing Elijah and Marty, now managing editor of the Heartland Press, to let him write about Mekko's disappearance, Lee visits Boontill Prison. He talks with Mekko, but eventually realizes that the man is actually pretending to be Mekko. Lee inadvertently reveals Ginger's name, and crosses paths with her other stalker, a prison guard.

Lee consults with Cyrus and his attorney cousin Daymond about the imposter, and they state that this was a "rupidoop". That night, he meets with Ginger at her house to explain the visit, and leaves promising to continue investigating, unaware that the tattooed stalker is watching them. Lee returns upon hearing gunshots and sees a vehicle fleeing. He finds an agitated Ginger, who had just shot the man whom she recognized as the tattooed stalker. At the bookstore, Lee is shocked when the police arrives to leave Lee Sr. with him.

== Production ==
=== Development ===
In September 2026, FX announced that the first episode of the season would be titled "The Rupidoop", and that it would be written and directed by series creator Sterlin Harjo. This marked Harjo's third writing credit, and fifth directing credit.

=== Writing ===
Ethan Hawke explained that Lee Sr. is "hustling" his way, as evidenced by the opening scene. Tommy Lee Jones further added, "Yeah, he's trying to get a free ride into town. And what better way than to pretend you don't know the date? He gets a ride precisely to his destination, which is his son's doorstep."

== Reception ==
=== Critical reviews ===
"The Rupidoop" received highly positive reviews from critics. Josh Spiegel of The A.V. Club gave the episode a "B+" grade and wrote, "As much as The Lowdown is boosted by its exemplary writing, carefully constructing its setting through three-dimensional character work, the show is constantly buoyed by the shrewd and charismatic Hawke. Lee Raybon is a bundle of contradictions, desperate to be seen as a good man, father, and writer even though he barely wants to put in the work in any of those roles. That Hawke is so adept at bringing this guy to life, and to make him this lovable, is a testament to his immense talent as an actor. Seeing as Hawke is arguably the best actor of his generation, it only tracks that the man who made Lee Raybon what he is should be portrayed by one of the acting legends of his generation."

Amanda Whitting of Vulture gave the 2-episode premiere a 4 star out of 5 rating and wrote, "Knowing that the season premiere would feature a two-episode drop, I'll admit the “Rupidoop” coda left me with a sense of dread. A seldom-seen Hollywood heavyweight cast as the long-lost dad of the series protagonist? I braced for a plot-stalling flashback." Matthew Fox of Show Snob wrote, "Sterlin Harjo has a talent for writing these kinds of stories. There's drama and there's intrigue, but there's also humor and time for an exploration of the local culture. That's a gift, and it's the mix that makes this show engaging. The other piece of that is Hawke, who continues to be pitch-perfect in this role. I'm ready for a new adventure."

Sean T. Collins of The New York Times wrote, "After Jeanne Tripplehorn's formidable and complex romantic foil for Lee in Season 1, Gilpin has a tough act to follow. But she and Jones, as Lee Senior, are the kind of performers who can power The Lowdown to new heights." Caemeron Crain of TV Obsessive wrote, "As I expected, it looks like the structure of The Lowdown will resemble that of Justified in its heyday, with central characters and some story elements persisting, while the new season is defined by guest stars who play antagonists, people in peril, and others. I hope it's clear that this it not a complaint. I love Justified, and I'm not entirely sure yet but I might end up loving The Lowdown even more."
