= Whiskey Bent and Hell Bound =

Whiskey Bent and Hell Bound may refer to:

- Whiskey Bent and Hell Bound (album), a 1979 album by Hank Williams Jr.
- Whiskey Bent and Hell Bound (song), a 1979 single by Hank Williams Jr.
- "Whiskey Bent and Hell Bound" (The Lowdown), an episode of the American crime drama television series The Lowdown.
