= Mother of My Children =

Studio album by Black Belt Eagle Scout
- Released: August 25, 2017
- Genre: Grunge
- Length: 34:39
- Label: Good Cheer; Saddle Creek
- Producer: Katherine Paul

Black Belt Eagle Scout chronology
Black Belt Eagle Scout (2014)	Mother of My Children (2017)	At the Party with My Brown Friends (2019)

Mother of My Children is the debut studio album by American musician Katherine Paul under the moniker Black Belt Eagle Scout, released on August 25, 2017, through Good Cheer Records. It was re-released on September 14, 2018, through Saddle Creek Records. It received acclaim from critics.

== Background ==
Paul wrote the album during the Dakota Access Pipeline protests in 2017, after her mentor Geneviève Castrée had died, and as her relationship with her girlfriend was coming to an end.

== Critical reception ==
Professional ratings
Aggregate scores
Source	Rating
Metacritic	81/100
Review scores
Source	Rating
Mojo	4/5 stars
Pitchfork	7.2/10
Q	4/5 stars
The Skinny	4/5 stars
Tiny Mix Tapes	4/5 marks
Under the Radar	8/10 stars

Mother of My Children received a score of 81 out of 100 on review aggregator Metacritic based on six critics' reviews, indicating "universal acclaim". Q called it "one of 2018's gems", and Mojo stated that "in 'Just Lie Down', grief gives way to wrath and post-hardcore freakery. While 'Soft Stud' and 'Sam, a Dream' have more blissful guitar codas that signify a resolution to her woes". Tiny Mix Tapes' Frank Falisi wrote that the album "measures unknowable moments against a single identity. The crunch is intimate, the crux universal" but that it "isn't despondent. It's not desperate enough to reconfigure loss into despairing elegy".

Reviewing the album for Pitchfork's Maggie Lange stated, "transparent but weathered, her sound has a beach-glass blurriness befitting an album devoted to many forms of loss and mourning that unfolds in moving, hazy episodes". Tony Inglis of The Skinny remarked that "ideas of Native American identity are channelled through spiky guitar and showers of feedback" and takes "the lessons learned from a musical education built on Hole and Nirvana, to give voice to a range of universal emotions, magnified by her unique place in the world". Under the Radar's Max Freedman found that its "magic lies in how she details her life without explicitly naming the oppression she experiences on a daily basis" as "what shines [...] is the notion that, although the struggles of marginalized folks are fully real and in deep need of fixing, oppressed people work through the same personal, emotional, and romantic turmoil as all people do".

== Track listing ==
All tracks are written by Katherine Paul.

Mother of My Children track listing
No.	Title	Length
1.	"Soft Stud"	6:08
2.	"Indians Never Die"	4:30
3.	"Keyboard"	3:50
4.	"Mother of My Children"	3:04
5.	"Yard"	4:10
6.	"I Don't Have You in My Life"	4:23
7.	"Just Lie Down"	4:01
8.	"Sam, a Dream"	4:33
Total length:		34:39
