= The Lowdown (American TV series) =

American neo-noir drama series

- Genre: Crime drama; Comedy drama; Neo-noir
- Created by: Sterlin Harjo
- Starring: Ethan Hawke; Keith David; Kaniehtiio Horn; Ryan Kiera Armstrong; Betty Gilpin; Tommy Lee Jones
- Music by: JD McPherson
- Country of origin: United States
- Original language: English
- No. of seasons: 2
- No. of episodes: 15

Production
- Executive producers: Sterlin Harjo; Garrett Basch; Ethan Hawke; Ryan Hawke; Scott Teems; Duffy Boudreau
- Production location: Oklahoma
- Cinematography: Adam Stone; Mark Schwartzbard; Christopher Norr
- Editors: Patrick Tuck; David Chang; Dane McMaster; Gina Sansom
- Running time: 40–59 minutes
- Production companies: Crazy Eagle Media; Dive; Under the Influence Productions; FX Productions

Original release
- Network: FX
- Release: September 23, 2025 – present

Related
- Reservation Dogs

The Lowdown is an American crime comedy drama television series created by Sterlin Harjo for FX. It stars Ethan Hawke and Keith David and premiered on September 23, 2025. In January 2026, the series was renewed for a second season, which premiered on October 14, 2026.

== Premise ==
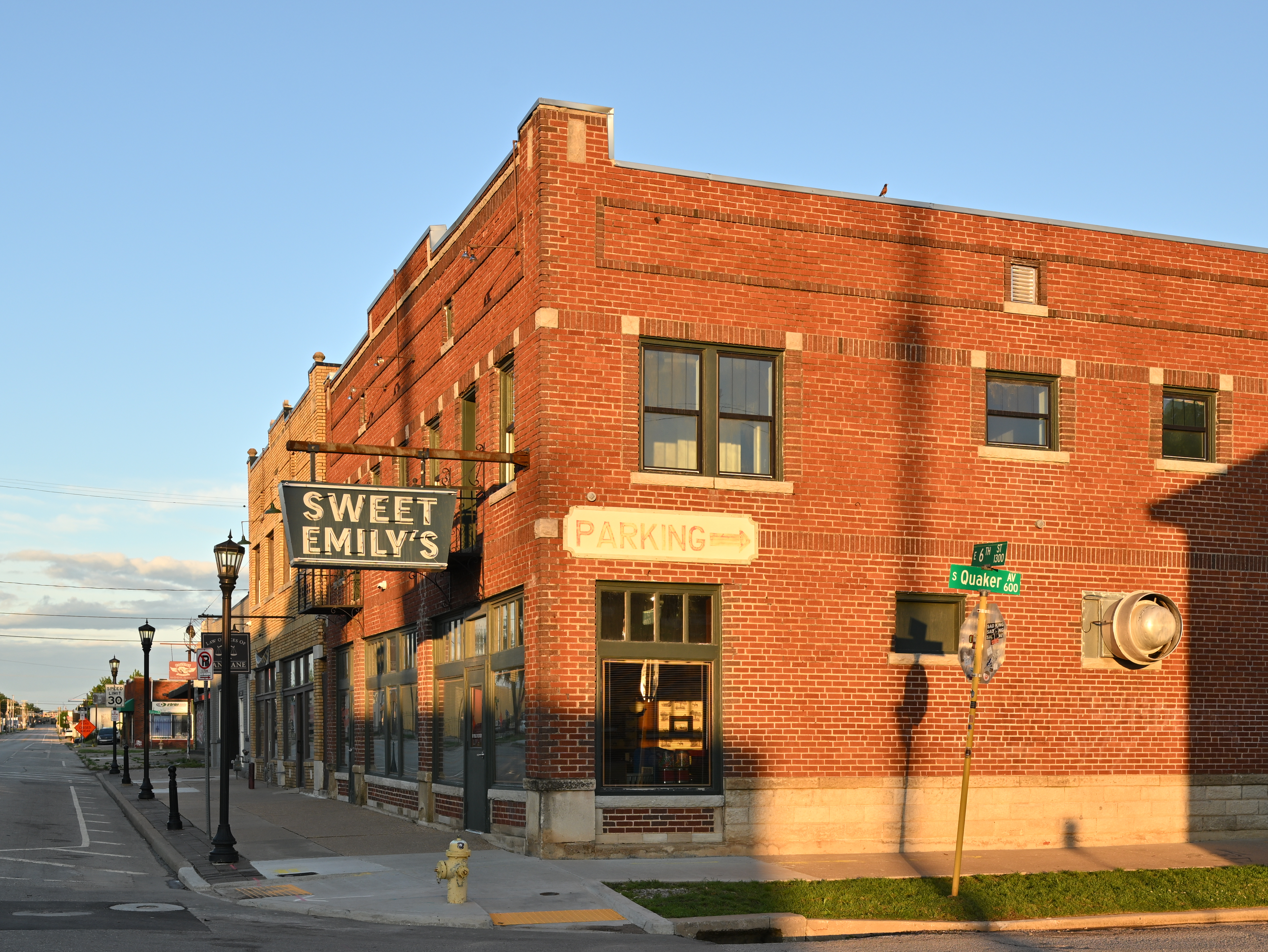
Block of buildings used in The Lowdown, Tulsa, OK

The series is set in Tulsa, Oklahoma. It features a man "who knows too much" and is loosely inspired by historian Lee Roy Chapman.

== Cast and characters ==
=== Main ===
- Ethan Hawke as Lee Raybon, an investigative journalist and self-proclaimed "truthstorian"
- Keith David as Marty Brunner, a private investigator and friend of Donald Washberg
- Kaniehtiio Horn as Samantha (season 2; recurring season 1), Lee's ex-wife
- Ryan Kiera Armstrong as Francis (season 2; recurring season 1), Lee and Samantha's teenage daughter
- Betty Gilpin as Ginger Lafferty (season 2), a public defender who works with Lee
- Tommy Lee Jones as Lee Raybon Sr. (season 2), Lee's elderly father

=== Recurring ===
- Jeanne Tripplehorn as Betty Jo Washberg, Dale Washberg's widow
- Macon Blair as Dan Kane, a lawyer and Lee's friend
- Scott Shepherd as Allen Murphy, an ex-con associated with Akron Construction
- Tim Blake Nelson as Dale Washberg, the deceased brother of Donald Washberg
- Tracy Letts as Frank Martin, the head of Akron Construction
- Michael Hitchcock as Ray Moseley, an antique dealer and Lee's friend
- Michael "Killer Mike" Render as Cyrus Arnold, the owner of the Tulsa Beat newspaper
- Cody Lightning as Waylon, an ex-con hired by Lee for security
- Abbie Cobb as Vickey Williams, a real estate agent and Lee's friend
- Josh Fadem as Abel Bell, the owner of the record shop next to Lee's bookstore
- Eric Edelstein as Blackie, a skinhead and Berta's friend
- Johnny Pemberton as Berta, a skinhead and Blackie's friend
- Zachary Booth as Elijah, the editor of the Heartland Press magazine
- Kyle MacLachlan as Donald Washberg, a candidate for governor of Oklahoma
- Siena East as Deidra, an employee at Lee's bookstore
- Rafael Casal as Johnny, a dentist and Samantha's boyfriend
- Dale Dickey as Bonnie, Blackie's mother
- Mato Wayuhi as Chutto McIntosh, a street artist
- Jude Barnett as Cousin Henry, Waylon's cousin
- Ken Pomeroy as Pearl Washberg, the daughter of Dale and Betty Jo
- Paul Sparks as Pastor Mark Sternwick, the head of a white supremacist church
- Tom McCarthy as Trip Keating, a philanthropist and associate of Frank Martin
- Austin Amelio as Lonnie Reed (season 2), a corrupt cop who relentlessly stalks Ginger
- Shane McRae as McMann (season 2), the head of the guards at Boontill Prison
- Eddie Spears as Mekko Dean (season 2), an incarcerated client of Ginger's who has gone missing
- Martha Plimpton as Vela Thorne (season 2), the sheriff of Woodrell County
- Clifton Collins Jr. as Bob Thorne (season 2), Vela's husband
- John Hawkes as Jed Sallsman (season 2), the judge of Woodrell County

=== Notable guests ===
- Paulina Alexis as Willie Jack
- Devery Jacobs as Elora Danan Postoak
- Johnny Polygon as Reverend Tyrell, the reverend of a local church
- John Doe as Marlon, a paddlefish poacher
- Peter Dinklage as Wendell, Lee's former business partner at the bookstore
- Tisha Campbell as Odette, a woman who Marty dates
- Graham Greene as Arthur Williams, Chutto's grandfather
- Derrick J. Haywood as Daymond Brown (season 2), Cyrus' cousin and an attorney
- Christopher Mintz-Plasse as Pookie (season 2), a client of Ginger's with a foot fetish
- Paul Schneider as Chili Franks (season 2), a depressed former prison guard
- Steve Earle as Dale Slater (season 2), the editor for the Woodrell County Monitor newspaper
- Gary Farmer as Otis Sharp (season 2), Mekko's talkative uncle
- Kirk Fox as Jeff Morgan (season 2), a lawyer and Ginger's former colleague

== Episodes ==
Season	Episodes	Originally released	
Season	Episodes	First released	Last released
1	8	September 23, 2025	November 4, 2025
2	8	October 14, 2026	November 25, 2026

=== Season 1 (2025) ===
No. overall	No. in season	Title	Directed by	Written by	Original release date	U.S. viewers (millions)
1	1	"Pilot"	Sterlin Harjo	Sterlin Harjo	September 23, 2025	0.267
In Tulsa, Oklahoma, self-styled "truthstorian" and bookseller Lee Raybon has published an exposé about the powerful Washberg clan; Dale Washberg, the black sheep of the family, hides a letter before being found dead of an apparent suicide. Investigating the Akron real estate development group, Lee is approached by a stranger named Marty, and is later attacked by skinheads Blackie and Berta. At Dale's estate sale, Lee discovers the letter, which reveals Dale hid more letters about a family conspiracy in his collection of Jim Thompson novels. Lee convinces antiques dealer Ray to acquire the collection for him in exchange for a stolen Joe Brainard painting, while tabloid editor Cyrus agrees to publish Lee's follow-up article and gives him a gun for protection. Dale's brother Donald is running for governor, and Lee deduces that he is having an affair with Dale's widow, Betty Jo. Blackie and Berta kidnap Lee to deliver him to Akron contractor Allen Murphy, who kills the skinheads instead, unaware Lee is in their trunk. Freed by Marty, who has been following him, Lee flees in Blackie's car and discovers a large envelope of cash.
2	2	"The Devil's Mama"	Sterlin Harjo	Sneha Koorse	September 23, 2025	0.175
A battered Lee uses some of the skinheads' cash as overdue child support for his ex Samantha, taking their daughter Francis for the weekend. Leaving her with his bookstore employee Deidra, Lee pays Deidra's recently paroled cousins Waylon and Henry to dispose of Blackie's car. Cyrus's office was vandalized by the skinheads, and Lee poses as a friend of Blackie to question his mother Bonnie, whose boyfriend Phil confirms that Blackie and Berta were working for Allen, a fellow racist ex-convict, who paid them for a job in Skiatook, where Dale lived. Donald's wife Maryann is unhappily aware of his affair, and Dale and Betty Jo's daughter Pearl returns home for her father's funeral, where Lee publicly accuses Donald of working with white supremacists. Marty reveals himself as a private investigator hired by Donald to follow Lee, who berates him for refusing to believe a greater conspiracy is afoot. Waylon and Henry post a rap video of themselves burning the car, and Allen visits Lee's bookstore with a veiled threat to stop his investigation.
3	3	"Dinosaur Memories"	Sterlin Harjo	Scott Teems	September 30, 2025	0.303
Fearing for his daughter's safety, Lee rents a new apartment from amorous real estate agent Vickey. Donald offers to make Marty the head of his security detail in exchange for informing Betty Jo that her prenup allows Donald to seize Dale's ranch, much to Betty Jo's outrage. Marty is later approached by Allen, but refuses to betray Lee's confidence. Ray admits that Dale's novels were bought by rival antiques dealer Catalina, and takes Lee and Francis to find her houseboat on Keystone Lake. Posing as a Fish and Wildlife officer, Lee is captured by Catalina's estranged husband Marlon and his brother Hook, part of a group of poachers selling paddlefish eggs as beluga caviar. They let Lee go after his enthralling story about winding up in jail, and he writes Marlon a love letter for Catalina, who catches Francis stealing the novels. Lee returns to discover Catalina has burned the books out of spite, but Francis was able to save Dale's mysterious letters, and they drive a drunken Ray home.
4	4	"Short on Cowboys"	Macon Blair	Duffy Boudreau	October 7, 2025	0.180
Dale's letters lead Lee to believe that Allen murdered the skinheads for failing to kill Dale, who had a heated argument with Donald over land a week before his death. Allen shares with his Alcoholics Anonymous group that he was saved from addiction by his boss, and learns that Bonnie and Phil were questioned by Lee. Samantha is marrying her boyfriend Johnny, and a mysterious street artist sells Lee a drawing of Dale, while Lee's editor Elijah warns that Donald is suing the Heartland Press for publishing Lee's article. To placate his wife, Donald is trying to evict Betty Jo, who brings Lee home to seduce him after a drunken night together. They each accidentally fire Dale's gun, and Betty Jo confesses that Dale was secretly gay; in his argument with Dale, Donald revealed that he was actually Pearl's father. Lee spends the night with Betty Jo, but suspects she may be manipulating him, and Donald spots him leaving in the morning. Allen contacts someone for help covering up the skinheads' murder, but is instead killed by a one-eyed gunman.
5	5	"This Land?"	Macon Blair	Olivia Purnell	October 14, 2025	0.254
Wendell, Lee's estranged former business partner, makes his annual visit and helps investigate the land Dale and Donald argued about in Indian Head Hills. There, Lee comes to blows with Wendell, who blames him for the fatal overdose of their friend Jesús, but they escape when armed men arrive. Vickey discovers the land is being sold at an overinflated value, which Lee suspects is essentially a bribe to Donald. Akron executive Frank Martin invites Donald to a meeting of fellow white businessmen working to seize power from Native Americans. Waylon and Henry's video draws Phil and his fellow skinheads to the bookstore, but Henry scares them off. A furious Donald confronts Betty Jo over her tryst with Lee, while Marty enjoys a blind date and agrees to join Donald's staff. Betty Jo tells Lee that Donald took Dale's gun, and Lee sends her to lay low at a "self-care retreat". Honoring Jesús's memory, Lee and Wendell agree to repair their friendship. Warning Pearl that her mother is in hiding, Lee is forcibly taken to a drunken, explosive party of police officers to meet with Donald.
6	6	"Old Indian Trick"	Danis Goulet	Jason Sack	October 21, 2025	N/A
A jealous Donald punches Lee and warns him to end his investigation, believing that Dale was manipulated into killing himself by a street artist. Samantha has called off her wedding and shares a drunken kiss with Lee, but thinks better of it. Donald meets Pastor Mark Sternwick, a member of Frank's sinister coalition, The 46, and realizes Mark's "One Well" church is behind the purchase of the Washbergs' land arranged by Akron. Deidra helps Lee track down the artist, Chutto, who explains that Dale was enamored with him and struck up a friendship with his senile grandfather Arthur. Revealing that the Washbergs' land in Indian Head Hills originally belonged to his own grandfather, who was murdered by white men to steal the land, Arthur has Dale's handwritten will leaving 3,200 acres to him and Chutto. Frank is threatened to uphold the land sale by Mark and his heavily armed confederates, including the one-eyed gunman, having killed Allen and disposing of Blackie and Berta's bodies to protect their plan to build a white nationalist "homeland". Informed by Lee about Dale's will, Betty Jo calls Frank.
7	7	"Tulsa Turnaround"	Danis Goulet	Walter Mosley	October 28, 2025	0.166
Mark preaches to his congregation of fellow ex-convicts and white supremacists, while Donald's reenactment of the Land Rush of 1889 is interrupted by protestors. Introducing Lee to his cousin, an attorney who agrees to help Chutto and Arthur, Cyrus gives Lee another gun. Racing to his daughter's parent-teacher conference, Lee is humiliated to discover Samantha has reconciled with Johnny, but Francis is hurt that Lee's truth-seeking crusade keeps him from showing up for her. Uncovering One Well's plans for their racially exclusive "Adonai City", Marty rescues Phil, who has been tarred and feathered by the church, and warns Lee. In return for a bag of cash from Frank, Betty Jo points him to Arthur, who pulls a gun when Frank demands the will and is killed in the scuffle. Frank drives off with the will just as Lee and Marty arrive and give chase, but Lee's van breaks down. Destroying the will, Frank flees to One Well, where Lee interrupts Mark's sermon to hold Frank at gunpoint. Attempting a citizen's arrest, Lee declares Frank a murderer and ignites an armed standoff.
8	8	"The Sensitive Kind"	Sterlin Harjo	Sterlin Harjo & Liz Blood	November 4, 2025	0.187
A year before his death, Dale met Lee at the bookstore, buying a novel for his collection. In the present, Marty and Lee escape from the church as Pastor Mark's gunmen open fire, grazing Marty's leg. They break into a feed store to treat him, and an angry Chutto throws a brick through the bookstore window. Lee supports Francis at her poetry reading before meeting Betty Jo at the Philbrook Museum of Art, but she refuses to take responsibility for Arthur's death. Lee presents Donald with the truth: conspiring with Betty Jo, Frank instructed Allen to intimidate Dale into agreeing to the land sale; Allen hired the skinheads, who accidentally shot Dale instead, and Betty Jo staged his suicide. Rejecting The 46, Donald publicly honors his brother's gift of the Washbergs' land to Chutto, who signs it over to the Osage Nation. Donald is elected governor, and Lee publishes another article in Dale's memory, while Mark and his associates are arrested, and Bonnie guns down Frank to avenge her son. At Samantha's wedding, Francis assures Lee that he is a good man. Elsewhere, Betty Jo gives a tearful barroom performance of "Luckenbach, Texas".

=== Season 2 (2026) ===
No. overall	No. in season	Title	Directed by	Written by	Original release date
9	1	"The Rupidoop"	Sterlin Harjo	Sterlin Harjo	October 14, 2026
A tribal police officer finds an elderly man wandering toward Tulsa — Lee's estranged father, Lee Raybon Sr. In Tulsa, Lee and his employees rush to a local journalism awards ceremony, where he delivers a rambling, intoxicated acceptance speech, much to his daughter's disappointment. Lee meets Ginger, a public defender being stalked by two men, and spots a neo-Nazi tattoo on one of the stalkers. He shares a confusing kiss with Ginger as she departs, and later finds her at her office, where she explains that she is being followed after her incarcerated client, Mekko Dean, disappeared. Convincing Elijah and Marty, now managing editor of the Heartland Press, to let him write about Mekko's disappearance, Lee visits Boontill Prison, where another inmate attempts to pose as Mekko. Lee inadvertently reveals Ginger's name, and crosses paths with her other stalker, a guard. Cyrus and his attorney cousin Daymond confirm that Lee was duped by a "rupidoop" and he informs Ginger, who shoots the tattooed stalker when he tries to break into her home, but he escapes. That night, officers deliver Lee Sr. to his son.
10	2	"Whiskey Bent and Hell Bound"	Sterlin Harjo	Sneha Koorse	October 14, 2026
Lee is unwilling to let his con man father back into his life, leaving Waylon, Henry, and neighboring record store owner Abel to keep an eye on him. However, Lee Sr. slips away and introduces himself to Francis. Ignoring Marty's concerns about his investigation, Lee warns Ginger that prison guards may be involved, but she is reluctant to accept his help. One of her office's clients, Pookie, is being sent to Boontill and Ginger exploits his foot fetish, asking him to find out what he can about Mekko. Arriving in prison, Pookie receives a cell phone. A gas station clerk points Lee to a strip club frequented by the other stalker, McMann, and his fellow guards. There, Lee befriends Chili Franks, a recently fired guard, and accompanies him home for information. The lonely Chili drunkenly plays with a shotgun, and Lee admits that he is a journalist. Taking Lee on a beer run, Chili instead brings him to McMann in an attempt to win his job back. Shooting at Lee, McMann demands to know where Mekko is, and Lee flees after McMann coldly shoots Chili in the face.
11	3	"Truth's Easy"	Scott Teems	Duffy Boudreau	October 21, 2026
Lee is rescued by Dale, a designated driver who gives him a mug emblazoned with the slogan, "Truth's easy". Warning Lee Sr. to leave Tulsa, Lee tells Ginger that Mekko must have escaped prison; this is being covered up by McCann and his fellow guards, which is why Ginger is being followed and Chili was killed. Ginger admits that she grew close to Mekko, and she and Lee question Mekko's uncle Otis at a living museum, unknowingly watched by the tattooed stalker. They encounter Mekko's ex, Angie, and their son Mekko Jr., as Angie confirms that Mekko escaped after the death of an unknown inmate. Marty unhappily takes over Lee's reporting on a local archaeological dig, but Ray invites him to a meeting for the sale of black market relics. Lee visits Samantha and Johnny's new home, while Francis is upset that Lee refuses to allow his abusive father in her life. Outside, Lee confronts the tattooed stalker, chipping a tooth in the process, and Johnny subdues the man only to discover he is a sheriff's deputy.
12	4	"Raw Milk"	Scott Teems	Liz Blood	October 28, 2026
Lee and Johnny go to Cyrus and Daymond for help, but the captive deputy, Lonnie Reed, escapes. Lee leaves Lonnie's gun with neighboring attorney Dan for safekeeping, and Ginger accompanies him to Johnny's dental practice to repair his tooth. They suspect that Mekko's disappearance is linked to the death of Nathan Spence, a 19-year-old inmate from Lonnie's jurisdiction in Woodrell County. There, Ginger's fellow public defender Jeff Morgan takes her to meet Nathan's mother, while Lee discovers Dale is editor of the local newspaper. Lee Sr. joins Marty and Ray at an artifact auction, revealing his own history of "treasure-hunting" and stealing a shell gorget. At the county fair, Lee tries to question Sheriff Vela Thorne, but is overcome after drinking raw milk and arrested by Lonnie. Thorne and McMann, her cousin, threaten to frame Lee for Chili's death and demand he bring them Ginger. Instead, Lee prepares to call "Big D", whose phone number is written inside his boot.
13	5	"A Dog with Two Tails"	Rafael Casal	Lou Berney	November 4, 2026
Donald Washberg, now the Governor of Oklahoma, arranges for Lee's release from jail. At a diner, he and Lee meet the judge of Woodrell County, Jed Sallsman, who takes them riding at his lavish estate, Tallgrass Ranch. Lee learns that Sallsman's work release program, ”Fresh Start”, is a meat packing facility run by Bob Thorne, Vela's husband. Jeff warns Vela that he took Ginger to see Nathan's mother Deborah, and Lonnie and McMann exhume Chili's body to incinerate it. Much to his chagrin, Lee discovers that Francis has invited Lee Sr. to her birthday party at the bowling alley, where Samantha forces them to make peace. Ginger informs Lee that Deborah believes her son died at the diversion program, but they arrive at Deborah's house to find that she has been murdered. Distraught, Ginger demands to be alone and calls Pookie, who reveals prison gossip that Mekko "killed a kid" while at the diversion program. Hanging up, Ginger is abducted by Lonnie and McMann abduct Ginger at gunpoint.
14	6	"Leaving and Coming Back"	Rafael Casal	Olivia Purnell	November 11, 2026
Lee storms Marty's private golf club, urging him to help investigate the diversion program and Nathan's death, while Francis continues to bond with her grandfather. Vela meets with Jed, suggesting that she and her men deserve a larger cut of their lucrative diversion scheme, and she and Bob celebrate his murder of Deborah. After a desperate attempt to escape McMann's trailer, the captive Ginger convinces Lonnie that McMann will kill them both. They flee together, accidentally hitting McMann with the car, and Lonnie explains that Mekko and other Boontill prisoners were used as enforcers to keep Fresh Start laborers in line. Ginger finds Lee at the bookshop, fearing that Mekko was responsible for Nathan's death and that she never truly knew him. Sneaking into Sweet Emily's for an after-hours drink, Ginger and Lee spend a passionate night together. He wakes up alone, and reluctantly agrees to drive Lee Sr., quietly reconciling as they retrieve a gift for Francis. At a gas station, Lee Sr. dies peacefully in the van, and Lee drives them back to Tulsa.
15	7	"Hot Weeners!"	Sterlin Harjo	Scott Teems & Sterlin Harjo	November 18, 2026
As Lee Sr.'s family prepares to honor his elaborate final wishes, Lee comforts Francis with her grandfather's gift: a necklace that belonged to Lee's mother, along with Lee Sr.'s journal. Lee confronts a man inside Ginger's house, who turns out to be Mekko. Reunited with Ginger, Mekko witnessed Nathan die after being badly beaten at Fresh Start on McMann's orders, and escaped before McMann could kill him, leaving a cell phone with video of Nathan's body hidden in the Fresh Start office. Ginger enlists the help of Lonnie, who stumbled onto the diversion scheme: Vela sends young offenders to Jed to be sentenced to Fresh Start, for payoffs from Bob’s increased profits. Jed confronts Vela and Bob after the hospitalized McMann reveals Mekko’s disappearance, while Marty is determined to expose the stolen relics market. Commandeering a delivery truck, Lee infiltrates Fresh Start with Otis and recovers the phone, but is recognized by the inmate who posed as Mekko and forced to subdue him. Mekko kidnaps the payoff courier, Shorty Henderson, and robs Bob's money stash. Lee returns to Ginger to celebrate, unknowingly followed by McMann.
16	8	"The Tower"	Sterlin Harjo	Sterlin Harjo	November 25, 2026

== Production ==
A drama pilot titled The Sensitive Kind created and executive produced by Sterlin Harjo and starring Ethan Hawke was announced in February 2024 by FX. Hawke is also an executive producer alongside Garrett Basch and it was produced by FX Productions. In May 2025, the series title was confirmed as The Lowdown.

The pilot was filmed in Oklahoma in April and May 2024. The cast of the pilot includes Keith David, Siena East, Jeanne Tripplehorn, Tim Blake Nelson, Scott Shepherd, Tracy Letts, Kyle MacLachlan, and Macon Blair as well as Kaniehtiio Horn, Killer Mike, Cody Lightning, Michael Hitchcock, and Ryan Kiera Armstrong. It received a series order from FX in October 2024. Principal photography began on February 10, 2025. Adam Stone, Mark Schwartzbard, and Christopher Norr serve as cinematographers. Patrick Tuck, Dane McMaster, and Gina Sansom are editors.

Harjo confirmed that the series takes place in the same fictional universe as Reservation Dogs, another FX series that he co-created, and in which Hawke and Horn portrayed different characters. In the pilot episode, Paulina Alexis makes a cameo appearance as Willie Jack, her character from that series, while Devery Jacobs makes a cameo appearance as her character Elora Danan Postoak in the second episode.

In January 2026, FX renewed the series for a second season. In March 2026, Betty Gilpin and Tommy Lee Jones were announced to have been cast in the second season. In April, Austin Amelio joined the cast.

== Release ==
The Lowdown had its world premiere on September 4, 2025, as part of the primetime program lineup of the 2025 Toronto International Film Festival. The series subsequently premiered on FX on September 23, 2025, with its first two episodes. while the remaining six episodes aired weekly thereafter.

The second season is set to premiere on FX and Hulu on October 14, 2026.

=== Streaming ===
Episodes of The Lowdown were made available for streaming on Hulu the day after their FX broadcast. Internationally, the series was made available to stream on Disney+.

Analytics company Samba TV, which gathers viewership data from certain smart TVs and content providers, reported that The Lowdown attracted 719,000 U.S. households during its first six days on Hulu. JustWatch, a guide to streaming content with access to data from more than 20 million users around the world, calculated that it placed among the ten most-streamed television series in the U.S. from September 22 to October 5, 2025. Streaming analytics firm FlixPatrol, which monitors daily updated VOD charts and streaming ratings across the globe, announced that during the week of December 29, The Lowdown appeared in the Disney+ Top 10 in 18 European countries, including markets across Southeastern Europe (the Balkans), Central Europe, Northern Europe (the Nordic countries), and the Baltic region. The series subsequently ranked eighth on Disney+ globally and on Hulu's rankings on January 2, 2026.

== Reception ==
=== Critical response ===
For the first season, the review aggregator website Rotten Tomatoes reported a 98% approval rating based on 59 critic reviews with an average rating of 8.5/10. The website's critics consensus reads, "Brightening up its mysteries with a hometown affection for Tulsa and hanging its hat on Ethan Hawke's hangdog charisma, The Lowdown reaches impressive highs as pulpy entertainment." Metacritic, which uses a weighted average, gave the first season a score of 85 out of 100 based on 29 critics, indicating "universal acclaim".

For the second season, Rotten Tomatoes reported a 100% approval rating based on 16 critic reviews with an average rating of 8.3/10. The website's critics consensus reads, "The case may get a little messy, but The Lowdown makes a compelling argument for following Ethan Hawke down another rabbit hole of oddball characters, offbeat humor, and intriguing mysteries." Metacritic gave the second season a score of 92 out of 100 based on 9 critics, indicating "universal acclaim".

=== Ratings ===
The Lowdown recorded a peak total audience (P2+) of 303,000 viewers with a 0.09 rating on September 30, 2025. Among adults aged 18–49, the highest reported audience was 81,500 viewers (0.06 rating) on the same date. The most recent episode, aired on November 4, 2025, attracted 187,000 total viewers (0.06 rating), including 27,000 viewers aged 18–49 (0.02 rating) and 153,500 household viewers (0.12 rating). Across the measured period, total viewership (P2+) ranged from 166,000 to 303,000 viewers, while ratings among adults aged 18–49 varied between 0.02 and 0.06.

=== Accolades ===
The American Film Institute included The Lowdown among the top-ten television programs of 2025. Ethan Hawke received a nomination for Best Lead Performance in a New Scripted Series at the 2026 Film Independent Spirit Awards.
