= Truth's Easy =

- The Lowdown episode
- Episode no.: Season 2 Episode 3
- Directed by: Scott Teems
- Written by: Duffy Boudreau
- Cinematography by: Christopher Norr
- Editing by: Kyle Reiter
- Original air date: October 21, 2026
- Running time: 46 minutes

Guest appearances
- Rafael Casal as Johnny; Steve Earle as Dale; Gary Farmer as Otis Sharp; Michael Hitchcock as Ray Moseley; Austin Amelio as Lonnie Reed; Siena East as Deidra; Richard Robichaux as Lane Singleton

Episode chronology
← Previous "Whiskey Bent and Hell Bound"	Next → "Raw Milk"

"Truth's Easy" is the third episode of the second season of the American crime drama television series The Lowdown. It is the eleventh overall episode of the series and was written by executive producer Duffy Boudreau, and directed by executive producer Scott Teems. It originally aired on FX on October 21, 2026.

The series is set in Tulsa, Oklahoma, and follows self-styled "truthstorian" and bookseller Lee Raybon. As he struggles to form a steady relationship with his ex-wife and daughter, he gets involved in plots revolving around people in the city. In the episode, Lee and Ginger try to locate a familiar of Mekko for more information, while Marty is forced to cover a story for Lee.

The episode received highly positive reviews from critics, with Hawke earning high praise for his performance.

== Plot ==
Lee flees from McMann's cabin and is picked up by Dale, a designated driver. Lee is interested in a mug emblazoned with the slogan, “Truth's easy”, so the driver gives it to him before dropping him near his van.

Upon learning that his father has spent time with Francis, Lee confronts him at a diner and demands that he leave Tulsa. Subsequently, he visits Ginger, telling her that Mekko escaped prison, and explaining why McMann and the other stalker had been after her. Ginger admits that she grew close to Mekko, and she and Lee question Mekko's uncle Otis at a living museum, unaware that the stalker is following them. After interrogating him, they meet Mekko's ex, Angie, and their son Mekko Jr., as Angie confirms that Mekko escaped after the death of an unknown inmate.

With Lee dropping out of covering an archaeological dig story, Marty is forced to take over. Despite feeling unhappy, he realizes that Lee did it on purpose to get him involved in a new story, while Ray invites him to a meeting for the sale of black market relics. Lee has dinner with Francis, Samantha and Johnny, but Francis is upset with Lee for never informing her about Lee Sr.'s status. Suddenly, Lee realizes the tattoeed stalker is following him, and they engage in a fight. Johnny helps Lee in knocking him out, but they find a badge, realizing he is a deputy sheriff.

== Production ==
=== Development ===
In September 2026, FX announced that the third episode of the season would be titled "Truth's Easy", and that it would be written by executive producer Duffy Boudreau, and directed by executive producer Scott Teems. This marked Boudreau's second writing credit, and Teems' first directing credit.

== Reception ==
=== Critical reviews ===
"Truth's Easy" received highly positive reviews from critics. Josh Spiegel of The A.V. Club gave the episode a "B+" grade and wrote, ""Truth's Easy" puts Lee's current crisis in a sharp and unpleasant light by its final moments, as he's inadvertently dragged an innocent bystander into the crosshairs. In the first season finale, Lee came to accept that he should be more forgiving of those around him, even if they don't present themselves as deserving of grace. It's a reminder he's less willing to hear this week."

Amanda Whitting of Vulture gave the episode a 4 star out of 5 rating and wrote, "what makes "Truth's Easy" such a treat to watch is the episode's restraint. Lee, emerging from the dark woods beyond McMann's cabin, gets picked up by a guy who nicknames himself the Boontill Oracle, a do-gooder who waits outside highway bars to give safe rides to local drunks. Played by Steve Earle, Dale offers Lee a sandwich, but Lee is more intrigued by a novelty mug in the cab of his truck." Matthew Fox of Show Snob wrote, "There are some serious layers to the case, and yet Lee is distracted by the presence of his father and what it means for his relationship with Francis. That makes this a fun journey to take as we move through season 2."

Sean T. Collins of The New York Times wrote, "Perhaps it displays insufficient critical distance to wish the protagonists of a television show the best, but here's hoping both Lee and Ginger find the stillness they so desperately need. At the rate they're going, they might die of exhaustion otherwise." Caemeron Crain of TV Obsessive wrote, "Now, Marty is intrigued, and so am I. It wouldn't be The Lowdown if there weren't some nefarious muckety-mucks involved."
