= Whiskey Bent and Hell Bound (The Lowdown) =

- The Lowdown episode
- Episode no.: Season 2 Episode 2
- Directed by: Sterlin Harjo
- Written by: Sneha Koorse
- Cinematography by: Mark Schwartzbard
- Editing by: Patrick Tuck; David Chang
- Original air date: October 14, 2026
- Running time: 52 minutes

Guest appearances
- Christopher Mintz-Plasse as Pook; Paul Schneider as Chili Franks; Macon Blair as Dan Kane; Siena East as Deidra; Lee Eddy as Darla; Josh Fadem as Abel Bell; Cody Lightning as Waylon; Shane McRae as McMann; Eddie Spears as Mekko Dean

Episode chronology
← Previous "The Rupidoop"	Next → "Truth's Easy"

"Whiskey Bent and Hell Bound" is the second episode of the second season of the American crime drama television series The Lowdown. It is the tenth overall episode of the series and was written by co-executive producer Sneha Koorse, and directed by series creator Sterlin Harjo. It originally aired on FX on October 14, 2026.

The series is set in Tulsa, Oklahoma, and follows self-styled "truthstorian" and bookseller Lee Raybon. As he struggles to form a steady relationship with his ex-wife and daughter, he gets involved in plots revolving around people in the city. In the episode, Lee gains a new lead in Makko's case and tries to befriend a prison guard, while Ginger tries to do her own investigation.

The episode received critical acclaim, with critics praising the performances, character development, tone balance and humor.

== Plot ==
Lee is dismayed by his father's return, having cut ties with him for 17 years due to his life as a con artist. While his father wants to meet Francis, Lee makes it clear he does not want him involved in his life and tells him to leave by the end of the day. Before leaving, he asks Waylon, Henry, and neighboring record store owner Abel to keep an eye on him. Nevertheless, he tricks them into revealing Francis' name and location.

Lee visits Ginger to warn about the guards, but she maintains she wants to do her investigation alone. She interrogates criminal Pookie, a soon-to-be-incarcerated man with a foot fetish, to ask about Mekko. She takes off her heel, asking him to be an informant for her in prison, which he agrees. Lee gets a clue from a gas station clerk, directing him to a strip club where McMann, the guard stalker, frequents. He takes an interest in Chili Franks, a recently fired guard. He befriends Chili under the guise that he wants to be a guard, and he is invited to his house. Lee Sr. locates Francis' school and meets her, and is astonished to learn that Lee told her he had died.

When Chili plays with a shotgun, Lee reveals he is a journalist. Chili agrees to help him, but takes him along for more beers. He takes him to a house in the woods, with McMann inside. McMann starts shooting at Lee as he demands to know Mekko's location, forcing him to flee into the woods. When Chili asks McMann to get his job back, he shoots him in the face, scaring Lee in the distance.

== Production ==
=== Development ===
In September 2026, FX announced that the second episode of the season would be titled "Whiskey Bent and Hell Bound", and that it would be written by co-executive producer Sneha Koorse, and directed by series creator Sterlin Harjo. This marked Koorse's second writing credit, and Harjo's sixth directing credit.

=== Writing ===
Harjo said that he hoped to emphasize the comedic elements of the series, "I think that if this feels funnier, it's because I had more room. I was building a world in season one, and in this one, people already know the world, so I could really just hit the ground running, and that gave me the confidence to really go for it. I didn't have to explain who Lee was or what he was doing. I could really just lean into his life as we enter this moment. And I'm always looking for humor. I couldn't do something that was not somewhat humorous, I don't think.”

== Reception ==
=== Critical reviews ===
"Whiskey Bent and Hell Bound" received critical acclaim. Josh Spiegel of The A.V. Club gave the episode an "A–" grade and wrote, "The mysteries that serve as the show's foundation are fascinating and involving, but they are populated by characters that are fleshed out well before their first lines of dialogue. They're constantly surprising, and make it impossible to look away from them. Wherever the mystery of Mekko Dean takes us is almost immaterial; I'm just excited to be back in this world with these characters once more."

Amanda Whitting of Vulture gave the 2-episode premiere a 4 star out of 5 rating and wrote, "I braced for a plot-stalling flashback. So it was a relief to see “Whiskey Bent and Hell Bound” open in the present day, Lee Sr. eating cornflakes from a serving spoon behind the bookstore counter doing a fake dementia routine for his son's benefit." Matthew Fox of Show Snob wrote, "This was another great episode. I like the addition of Gilpin and Jones to the cast and their characters. The stories here are solid. I also like that others from the first season, like Keith David, are still around and have some interesting parts. There's a good mystery here and still some good laughs. I'm excited to see where we go from here."

Sean T. Collins of The New York Times wrote, "Only two episodes down, Lee is already in deep. A powerful law enforcement officer whose name and face Lee knows has just tried and failed to murder him, then murdered someone else while he watched — that's not the kind of thing you let slide if you're in the murdering business. Suddenly, Lee Sr. doesn't seem like the worst person who could show up at that bookstore's front door, and we've got a real thriller on our hands." Caemeron Crain of TV Obsessive wrote, "Through two episodes, The Lowdown Season 2 has presented a mystery that is compelling in part because we don't even know what the mystery is. There's a realism in that. Ethan Hawke remains brilliant as Lee Raybon. Betty Gilpin is fantastic as ever. Tommy Lee Jones is putting in an amazing turn as a doddering old guy who's probably nefarious."
