= Four Sheets to the Wind =

2007 film by Sterlin Harjo

- DVD cover
- Directed by: Sterlin Harjo
- Written by: Sterlin Harjo
- Produced by: Ted Kroeber; Chad Burris
- Starring: Cody Lightning; Tamara Podemski; Jeri Arredondo; Laura Bailey
- Cinematography: Frederick Schroeder
- Edited by: David Michael Maurer
- Music by: Jeff Johnston
- Production companies: Indion Entertainment Group; Kish Productions; Dirt Road Productions
- Distributed by: First Look Studios
- Release date: January 22, 2007 (Sundance)
- Running time: 81 minutes
- Country: United States
- Languages: English; Creek

Four Sheets to the Wind is a 2007 American coming-of-age drama film written and directed by Sterlin Harjo (in his feature directorial debut). It stars Cody Lightning, Tamara Podemski, Jeri Arredondo, and Laura Bailey. It follows a young man who leaves the Native American reservation to Tulsa, Oklahoma to stay with his sister after their father's suicide.

The film had its world premiere at the Sundance Film Festival on January 22, 2007, where Podemski was awarded the Special Jury Prize for Dramatic Performance. It received positive reviews from critics and Podemski was also nominated for Best Supporting Female at the 23rd Independent Spirit Awards.

== Plot ==
Young Seminole/Creek Cufe travels from his small Oklahoma hometown to the city of Tulsa to visit his troubled sister, Miri, after the suicide and funeral of their father. While Miri struggles with her life in the city, Cufe becomes friendly with, and then romantically involved with Miri's neighbor, Francie, and begins to realize that his life has more possibilities than he had imagined.

== Cast ==
- Cody Lightning as Cufe Smallhill
- Tamara Podemski as Miri Smallhill
- Laura Bailey as Francie
- Jeri Arredondo as Cora Smallhill
- Jon Proudstar as Jim
- Mike Randleman as Sonny
- Richard Ray Whitman as Frankie Smallhill

== Production ==
The script was developed with the support of the Sundance Institute and was filmed in Holdenville, Oklahoma (Harjo's hometown) and in Tulsa. Harjo has commented that one of his purposes in writing the script was to react against expectations and stereotypes, for example by depicting Cufe "drinking a beer" while not making alcoholism a central issue, and showing him becoming involved with Francie without making the movie into "an issue-driven interracial relationship story".

== Reception ==
=== Critical response ===
On the review aggregator website Rotten Tomatoes, 100% of 7 critics' reviews are positive.

Duane Byrge of The Hollywood Reporter called the film a "captivating crowd-pleaser" at Sundance and praised that "the performances are richly subdued" and "under filmmaker Sterlin Harjo's firm but whimsical hand, Four Sheets enchants, in large part because of its talented technical team." Zack Haddad of Film Threat described the film as "the Native American Garden State" and stated that it delivers "some wonderfuly oddball comedy while also being a very heart-felt statement." Patrick Z. McGavin of Screen Daily wrote, "Harjo has excellent actors to compensate for his inexperience. […] The movie runs just 85 minutes, and every moment feels lean and properly balanced." Dennis Harvey of Variety opined that the film is "so low-key it risks making little impression", but ultimately wins "viewer sympathy and affection."

=== Accolades ===
Year	Award	Winner/Nominee	Category	Result
2007	American Indian Film Festival	Sterlin Harjo	Best Film	Nominated
2007	American Indian Film Festival	Sterlin Harjo	Best Director	Won
2007	American Indian Film Festival	Cody Lightning	Best Actor	Won
2007	American Indian Film Festival	Tamara Podemski	Best Actress	Nominated
2007	American Indian Film Festival	Jeri Arredondo	Best Supporting Actress	Nominated
2007	Sundance Film Festival	Sterlin Harjo	Grand Jury Prize - Dramatic	Nominated
2007	Sundance Film Festival	Sterlin Harjo	Special Jury Prize - Dramatic	Won
2008	Independent Spirit Awards	Tamara Podemski	Best Supporting Female	Nominated

== See also ==
- List of films with a 100% rating on Rotten Tomatoes
