= The Land, the Water, the Sky =

Studio album by Black Belt Eagle Scout
- Released: February 10, 2023
- Genre: Indie rock; dream pop
- Length: 46:29
- Label: Saddle Creek
- Producer: Katherine Paul; Takiaya Reed

Black Belt Eagle Scout chronology
At the Party with My Brown Friends (2019)	The Land, the Water, the Sky (2023)

The Land, the Water, the Sky is the third studio album by American musician Katherine Paul under the moniker Black Belt Eagle Scout, released on February 10, 2023, through Saddle Creek Records. It received positive reviews from critics.

== Background and recording ==
Paul was touring North America in support of her 2019 album At the Party with My Brown Friends when the COVID-19 pandemic caused its cancelation, which prompted her to move back to Swinomish Indian Tribal Community on Puget Sound, Washington, where she was raised. Paul felt that the "grief, loneliness, and frustration" she experienced was accompanied by "belonging" to the environment, which influenced the album. Paul would hike to a studio 10 miles north of Sčičudᶻ, a path along the Pacific Northwest, with her guitar and write music along the way.

== Critical reception ==
Professional ratings
Aggregate scores
Source	Rating
Metacritic	78/100
Review scores
Source	Rating
AllMusic	3.5/5 stars
Clash	8/10
Classic Rock	3.5/5 stars
Exclaim!	7/10
The Line of Best Fit	6/10
Paste	8.2/10
Pitchfork	7.5/10
PopMatters	9/10
Sputnikmusic	3.8/5
Uncut	7/10

The Land, the Water, the Sky received a score of 78 out of 100 on review aggregator Metacritic based on 13 critics' reviews, indicating "generally favorable" reception. Classic Rock called it "a spectacular squall of uber-MBV sungaze dream-pop [that] propels indigenous Swinomish/Inupiaq woman Katherine Paul's journey". Uncut commented that "the slow-burn of 'Blue' is a soaring mid-set ballad with anthemic qualities showcasing a strong sense of dynamics. That captures the defiant mood, something best heard in opener 'My Blood Runs Through This Land' and the churning rage of 'Understanding'".

Reviewing the album for Pitchfork, Abigail Covington described it as "more than just a portrait of a place [...] these are love songs to a community and a lineage that taught Paul how to survive". Marcy Donelson of AllMusic wrote that "while there are moments of quiet reflection and affection here, Paul still embraces dissonant alt-rock textures on parts of the album" and the rest "proceeds in similarly poignant fashion, alternating between sparsity and bombast but never quite shaking its melancholy tone". A staff reviewer from Sputnikmusic called it "a difficult album to pin down" as it "fus[es] dream pop, indie rock, folk, and slowcore in ways that invite comparison to a different plethora of better-known artists depending on the song" but Paul "makes this formula work with strong execution and a compelling narrative".

Nick Roseblade of Clash stated that "lyrically The Land, the Water, the Sky is as rich, and stark, as the music backing it" and "what [it] does so well is blend Katherine Paul's musical loves. The juxtaposing of post-rock vibes and beautiful pop vocals, and harmonies, is where the album excels". Exclaim!'s Jordan Currie described it as "a powerful journey of healing through nature and connection to her familial and cultural roots" that "expand[s] on the echoing percussion, reverb-heavy guitars and soft, layered singing that have become staples in Black Belt Eagle Scout's discography". A staff review from Paste concluded that Paul "sounds especially at home on The Land, the Water, the Sky, finding a sweet spot where her sound remains compelling and poignant".

John Amen of PopMatters felt that the album "immediately spotlights her as a consummate composer" and Paul "advocates deference to nature without lapsing into preachiness, embodying spiritual confidence without tumbling into New-Age truisms". Writing for The Line of Best Fit, Liam Inscoe-Jones commented that although "there are stunning moments", that "the sound of the album is too monochrome in general, with ballads and epics all drawing from a similar palette".

== Track listing ==
All tracks are written by Katherine Paul.

The Land, the Water, the Sky track listing
No.	Title	Length
1.	"My Blood Runs Through This Land"	5:12
2.	"Sedna"	4:26
3.	"Salmon Stinta"	3:57
4.	"Blue"	3:16
5.	"On the River"	1:53
6.	"Nobody"	4:46
7.	"Fancy Dance"	2:12
8.	"Sčičudᶻ (A Narrow Place)"	3:49
9.	"Treeline"	5:36
10.	"Understanding"	2:16
11.	"Spaces"	4:06
12.	"Don't Give Up"	5:00
Total length:		46:29
