= At the Party with My Brown Friends =

Studio album by Black Belt Eagle Scout
- Released: August 30, 2019
- Genre: Indie rock
- Length: 35:02
- Label: Saddle Creek
- Producer: Katherine Paul

Black Belt Eagle Scout chronology
Mother of My Children (2017)	At the Party with My Brown Friends (2019)	The Land, the Water, the Sky (2023)

At the Party with My Brown Friends is the second studio album by American musician Katherine Paul under the moniker Black Belt Eagle Scout, released on August 30, 2019, through Saddle Creek Records. It received acclaim from critics.

== Background ==
In a statement accompanying the album, Paul stated that the "party" in the album and song title "symbolizes the world" and her "friends" are "her follow Indigenous people, as well as all people of color". She wrote the song "Going to the Beach with Haley" about her friend, singer-songwriter Haley Heynderickx.

== Critical reception ==
Professional ratings
Aggregate scores
Source	Rating
Metacritic	78/100
Review scores
Source	Rating
AllMusic	3.5/5 stars
DIY	4/5 stars
Exclaim!	8/10
The Line of Best Fit	7/10
Mojo	4/5 stars
The Observer	4/5 stars
Paste	7.3/10
Pitchfork	8.0/10
PopMatters	9/10
Uncut	8/10

At the Party with My Brown Friends received a score of 82 out of 100 on review aggregator Metacritic based on 16 critics' reviews, indicating "universal acclaim". Uncut called it a "more subdued yet equally captivating follow-up", and Mojo found that "any agitation on Katherine Paul's second LP is gently expressed". Peyton Thomas of Pitchfork felt similarly, writing that it "represents a softer, more subtle sort of resistance" that is "spent in the presence of the people she loves, [as] she is reminded that she is equal to any challenge which may befall her".

Exclaim!'s Sophie Brzozowski stated that "often lyrically sparse, Paul's songs unfold instead as sonic vistas, creating atmospheres rather than recounting stories", calling it "lusher and more delicate than its grungy predecessor, Mother of My Children, but no less powerful" and "a warm and appreciative ode to the joys of passing the time with people you love". Timothy Monger of AllMusic found it to be "a more robust affair, eschewing the lonesome lo-fi tones of her early output and embracing a thicker, albeit dreamier sound to frame her thoughtful musings". Reviewing the album for The Line of Best Fit, Bella Fleming opined that "with most tracks comprising largely of delicate vocals and the mellow strumming of guitar, the album does not stray far from Paul's distinct, dulcet sound".

Max Freedman of Paste remarked that "Paul favor[s] traditional song structures and modest tempos" on the album, as its "diminished intensity and tempos [...] are a much closer sonic fit for its focus on friendships, love and desire, topics far more comforting than romantic grief". The Observer's Emily Mackay felt that "Paul's soft voice, washed by reverb, recalls the dreamscapes of Beach House, and there are reminders of Sharon Van Etten in the enveloping swells of drums, grungy guitars and spacey shifts of rhythm [...] the uniqueness of her voice, though, stems not just from her origins, but her uncanny ability to capture the heart". Jon Young of Consequence observed it to have "a quietly compelling urgency. Although her unhurried singing and graceful melodies have the quality of a gentle hug, the burning emotions run deep".

Writing for PopMatters, Adriane Pontecorvo stated that Paul "draws us even deeper into her life with unassuming courage. Even on a superficial level, Paul's music is lovely. Her voice, a profoundly versatile instrument, is refreshingly free of obvious affectation, sincerely emotive, and naturally soothing". DIY's Ben Tipple described the album as "an exploration of love and friendship underpinned by dreamy hushed vocals and gentle guitar tones". Rosie Ramsden of The Skinny judged that "if Mother of My Children was a breakup blanket, a place in which you cocoon and cry, ATPWMBF is a warm summer blanket to share with your favourite person" but still found it to "have its shadows, its moments of darkness".

== Track listing ==
All tracks are written by Katherine Paul.

At the Party with My Brown Friends track listing
No.	Title	Length
1.	"At the Party"	3:54
2.	"My Heart Dreams"	3:40
3.	"Going to the Beach with Haley"	4:03
4.	"Real Lovin"	4:17
5.	"Run It to Ya"	3:39
6.	"I Said I Wouldn't Write This Song"	3:22
7.	"Scorpio Moon"	2:46
8.	"Half Colored Hair"	4:44
9.	"You're Me and I'm You"	4:37
Total length:		35:02
