= Wildflower (2022 film) =

2022 film by Matt Smukler and Jana Savage

- Theatrical release poster
- Directed by: Matt Smukler
- Screenplay by: Jana Savage
- Story by: Matt Smukler; Jana Savage
- Produced by: Ethan Lazar; Billie Lourd; Katie McNeill; Kyle Owens; Chris Parker; Jamie Patricof; Austen Rydell; Dylan Sellers
- Starring: Kiernan Shipka; Ryan Kiera Armstrong; Dash Mihok; Charlie Plummer; Alexandra Daddario; Brad Garrett; Reid Scott; Erika Alexander; Samantha Hyde; Jacki Weaver; Jean Smart
- Cinematography: Jeff Cutter
- Edited by: JC Bond
- Music by: Chad Fischer
- Production companies: eOne; Limelight; Morning Moon; Hunting Lane Films
- Distributed by: Momentum Pictures
- Release dates: September 12, 2022 (TIFF); March 17, 2023 (United States)
- Running time: 105 minutes
- Country: United States
- Language: English

Wildflower is a 2022 American coming of age comedy-drama film directed by Matt Smukler and written by Jana Savage, from a story by Smukler and Savage. It stars Kiernan Shipka, Dash Mihok, Charlie Plummer, Jean Smart, Alexandra Daddario, Reid Scott, Erika Alexander, Samantha Hyde, Brad Garrett, and Jacki Weaver.

The film premiered at the Toronto International Film Festival on September 12, 2022 and was released on March 17, 2023.

== Plot ==
Bea is the daughter of two intellectually disabled parents Sharon and Derek, and during her senior year in high school Bea is left comatose. Through flashbacks the story explores aspects of her life, including a romantic relationship with fellow student Ethan.

== Cast ==
- Kiernan Shipka as Bambi "Bea" Johnson
  - Ryan Kiera Armstrong as Young Bea
- Dash Mihok as Derek Johnson
- Charlie Plummer as Ethan
- Jean Smart as Peg
- Brad Garrett as Earl
- Alexandra Daddario as Joy
- Samantha Hyde as Sharon Johnson
- Jacki Weaver as Loretta
- Erika Alexander as Mary
- Reid Scott as Ben
- Victor Rasuk as Mr. Vasquez
- Kannon Omachi as Nia
- Chris Mulkey as Hal

== Development ==
The film was inspired by Smukler's niece, and was originally conceived as a short film before being developed as a feature film. The script was optioned by Morning Moon production company in 2020, who produced the film in partnership with Limelight and Entertainment One. The filmmakers consulted disability representation activist Elaine Hall during development.

== Release ==
The film was screened at the Toronto International Film Festival on September 12, 2022. It was released by Momentum Pictures on March 17, 2023 in the United States and Canada.

== Reception ==
On the review aggregator website Rotten Tomatoes, 60% of 35 critics' reviews are positive. The website's consensus reads: "Wildflower benefits from its appealing ensemble cast, but their efforts aren't quite enough to distinguish this middling coming-of-age story." Metacritic, which uses a weighted average, assigned the film a score of 52 out of 100, based on 7 critics, indicating "mixed or average" reviews.

William Bibbiani, writing for TheWrap, said that the film "can't seem to decide if it's a big mess or a formulaic teen drama, but when it gives us tender moments between its characters, it’s hard to really care." Lovia Gyarkye of The Hollywood Reporter wrote that the film "might not be a radical departure from films of its type, but it does offer buoyant performances from both fresh and familiar faces."

In a review titled "When Disability Representation Goes Wrong", Sarah Milner of /Film criticized its approach to portraying disability and described it as "inspiration porn." She criticized the portrayal of Sharon and Derek in particular, calling the characters "paper-thin punchlines." Wendy Ide in a review for Screen Daily compared the film to CODA (2021), but felt that Wildflower fell short in its portrayal of disabled parents by comparison. Charles Bramesco, writing for ThePlaylist.net, gave the film a C− rating and described its exploration of themes as shallow.
