= Katherine Paul =

Swinomish/Iñupiaq singer-songwriter

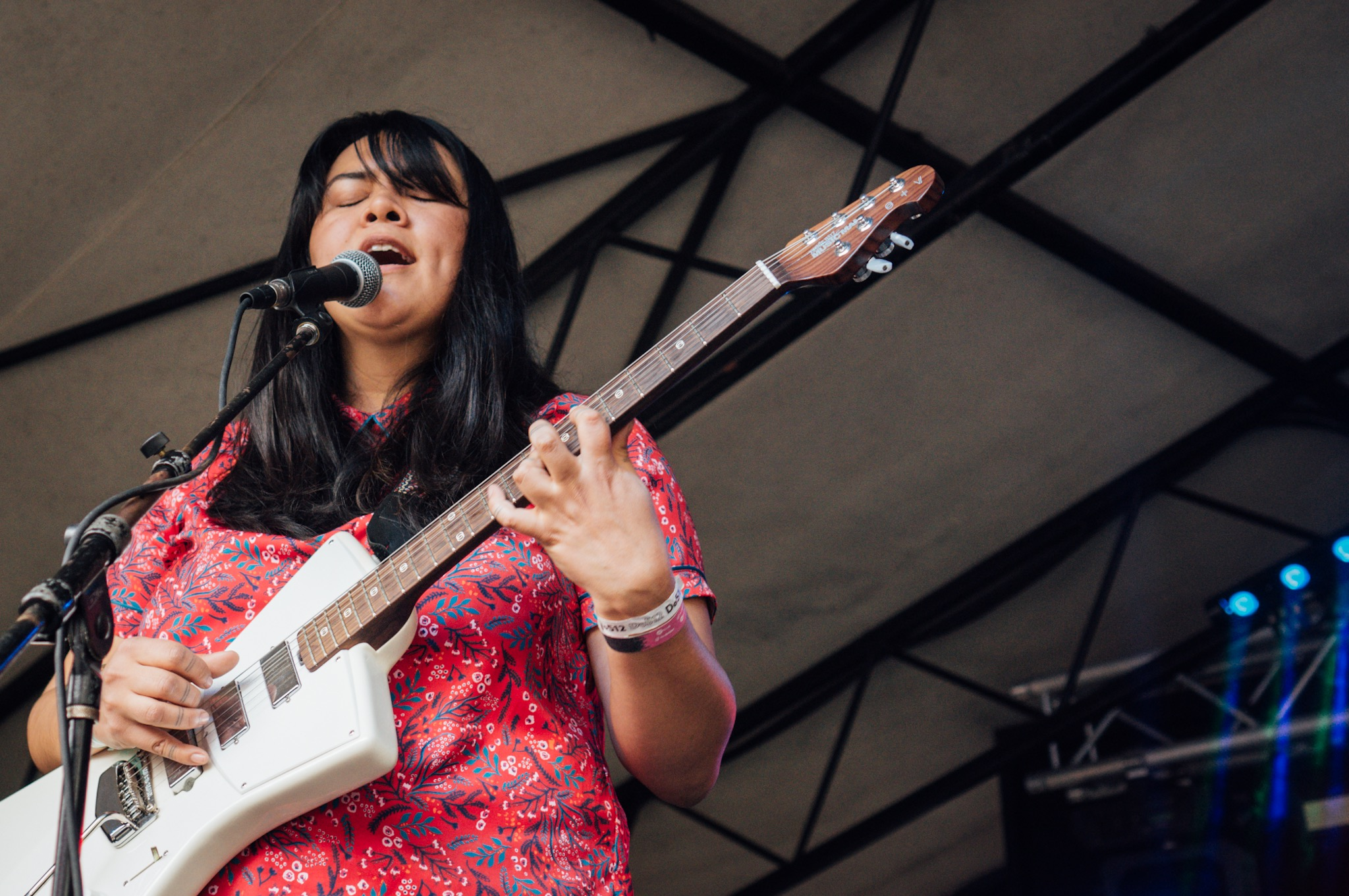
- Paul performing at South by Southwest in Austin, Texas, 2019

Background information
- Born: June 16, 1989 (age 37); Anacortes, Washington, U.S.
- Genres: Alternative rock; indie rock
- Occupations: Musician; singer-songwriter
- Instruments: Vocals; guitar; keyboards; drums
- Years active: 2014–present
- Label: Saddle Creek
- Website: blackbelteaglescout.com

Katherine Paul (born June 16, 1989) is a Swinomish/Iñupiaq singer-songwriter and multi-instrumentalist based in Portland, Oregon. Her music is influenced by post-rock, alternative rock, and Native American traditional music. She has released an EP and three albums under the moniker Black Belt Eagle Scout. Her self-titled EP as Black Belt Eagle Scout was released in June 2014. Her debut studio album, Mother of My Children, was first released by Portland tape label Good Cheer Records in 2017, then re-released in September 2018 by Saddle Creek Records. On April 26, 2019, Saddle Creek released a Black Belt Eagle Scout single titled "Loss & Relax" on a seven-inch vinyl backed with the B-side "Half Colored Hair".

== Early life ==
Paul was born in Anacortes, Washington to Kevin Paul, a Swinomish/Colville father and enrolled member of the Swinomish Indian Tribal Community, and Patricia Aqiimuk Paul, an Iñupiaq mother and enrolled member of the Native Village of Kotzebue in Alaska. Paul grew up on the Swinomish Reservation in the Puget Sound region of Washington. Her earliest musical experiences included listening to and singing indigenous music of the Coast Salish. She was a jingle dress dancer at regional pow wows with her family's drum group, the Skagit Valley Singers. At a young age, Paul began learning to play the piano and played the flute in her school band. Her interest in the guitar and drums began when she came into the possession of some bootleg VHS tapes of Hole and Nirvana, from which she taught herself to play those two instruments by pausing the tapes and studying the musicians’ fingerings and techniques.

During high school Paul became involved in the small DIY music scene in Anacortes, Washington near the Swinomish Indian Tribal Community, driving her parents' car to attend shows at the Department of Safety venue. The venue, located in an old firehouse, is where she met Canadian artist and musician Geneviève Castrée who became a mentor to Paul. An inspiration of Paul's, Castrée would attend her early performances, encouraging her and praising her for her playing.

In 2007, Paul moved from Washington to Portland, Oregon to attend college at Lewis & Clark College. While in Portland she became involved with the Rock and Roll Camp for Girls, and later contributed guitar, drums, and vocals for Portland-based bands Forest Park and Genders.

== Career ==
=== Mother of My Children (2017) ===
Paul's first release as Black Belt Eagle Scout was an eight-song self-titled EP in 2014. Her next release was 2017's Mother of My Children, Black Belt Eagle Scout's debut album. Paul played all the instruments on the album including bass, keyboard, percussion, organ, vibraphone, and piano, in addition to guitar, drums, and vocals. The album was recorded at the Unknown recording studio, a converted church in Anacortes. During the recording session, Paul stayed on the reservation with her parents. The first two tracks are accompanied by music videos by Diné filmmakers Demian DinéYazhi' ("Soft Stud") and Evan James Wood ("Indians Never Die"). Songs on the album deal with topics such as loss, grief, heartbreak, and Paul's identity as an indigenous queer woman. In 2016, her mentor Geneviève Castrée died of pancreatic cancer. Paul says music is what helped her process her grief during this time. This Paul accredits to her Native upbringing and the healing, spiritual roles that singing and drumming played for her during her upbringing. The album's second track "Indians Never Die" is a response to both the Dakota Access Pipeline protests at Standing Rock and to gentrification occurring in Portland. Paul is open and vocal about her identity as a "radical indigenous queer feminist".

== Critical reception ==
Black Belt Eagle Scout has been compared to other West Coast bands such as Mazzy Star and Nirvana. The Seattle Times refers to Black Belt Eagle Scout's sound as "intrinsically Northwest", because of Paul's blending of Pacific Northwest rock and Coast Salish traditional music. Pitchfork calls Mother of My Children "a collection of pensive rock songs saturated with an oceanic mood". John Amen of PopMatters gave The Land, the Water, the Sky a score of 9/10, noting, "Black Belt Eagle Scout teaches us, guides, and inspires us, all the while dazzling us with lush atmospheres, seismic rhythms, and a voice that unfurls from another and perhaps a better world."

== Personal life ==
Paul is married to drummer Camas Logue. In February 2026 they announced they are expecting their first child.

== Discography ==
Studio albums

- Mother of My Children (2017)
- At the Party with My Brown Friends (2019)
- The Land, the Water, the Sky (2023)

Extended plays

- Black Belt Eagle Scout (2014)

Singles

- "Loss & Relax" (2019)
- "Half Colored Hair" (2019)
- "My Heart Dreams" (July 24, 2019)
- "Run It to Ya" (August 27, 2019)
- "Don't Give Up" (2022)
- "My Blood Runs Through This Land" (2022)
- "Nobody" (2023)
- "Spaces" (2023)
