= Mato Wayuhi =

Oglala Lakota musician, producer, and composer

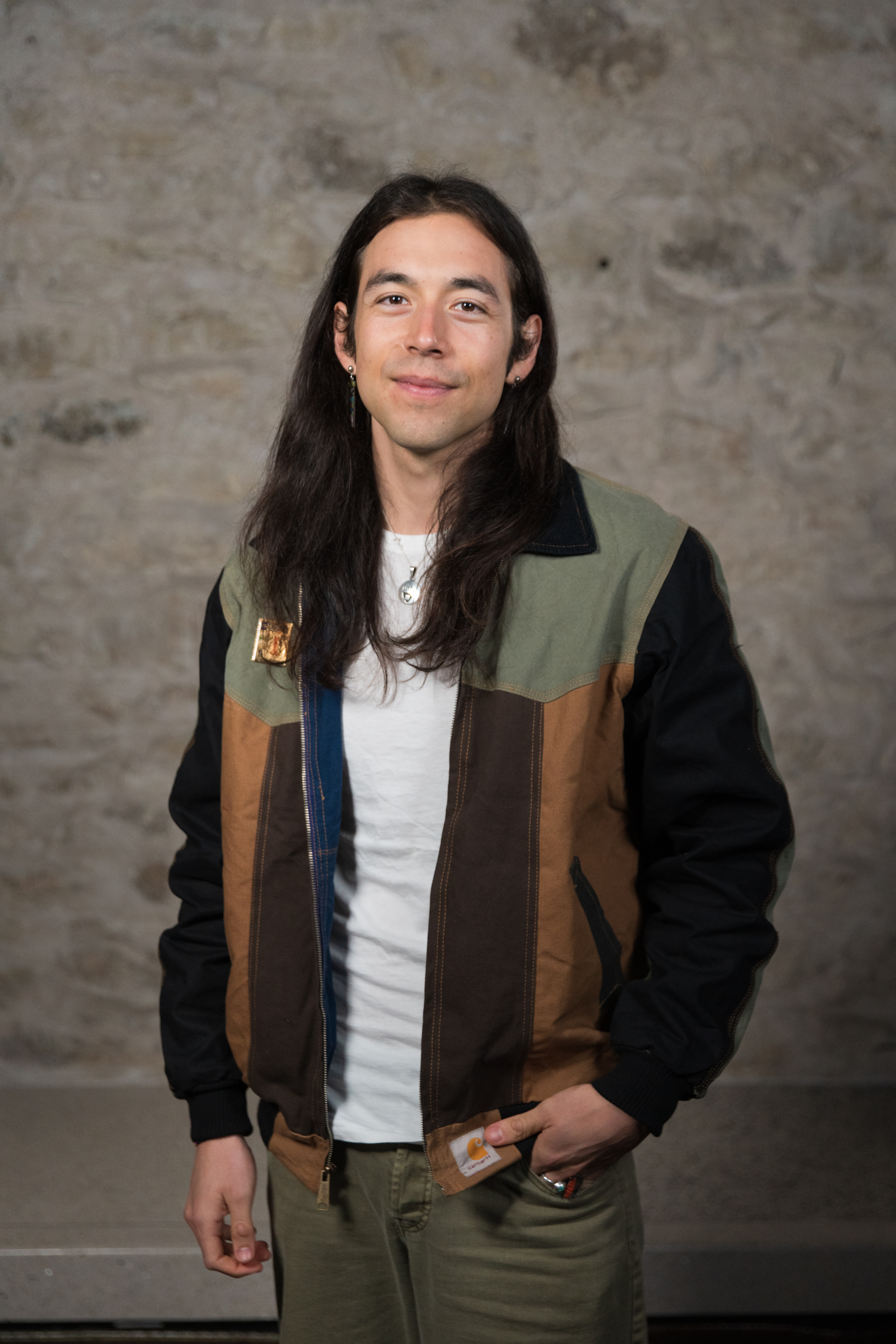
- Mato Wayuhi at 2025 SXSW
- Born: Mato Standing Soldier; 26 October 1997 (age 28)
- Education: University of Southern California (BA)
- Occupations: Musician; Producer; Composer
- Website: matowayuhi.net

Mato Standing Soldier (born October 26, 1997), professionally known as Mato Wayuhi, is an Oglala Lakota actor, musician, producer, and composer from South Dakota, United States known for his studio albums and his original soundtrack for the television series Reservation Dogs.

== Early life ==
Mato Standing Soldier grew up in Sioux Falls, spending a notable amount of time on the Pine Ridge Reservation. Wayuhi had an interest in music from a young age but, he did not start creating pieces until he was 15. While attending Lincoln High School, he began experimenting with rapping and music production, influenced by multiple genres from traditional Lakota music to punk rock. His interest in music production was a hobby Wayuhi tooled with in his basement until, taking a course on music production, where he learned basic skills and it "opened up everything" for him. Mato Wayuhi graduated with a bachelor's degree in Cinematic Arts from the University of Southern California, where he further developed his artistic voice.

== Career ==
=== 2014-2016: Beginnings ===
In his later years of high school and first years of college, Mato Wayuhi released multiple singles and EPs on various music streaming platforms. His earliest single, titled "Potions" was released in 2014 followed by eight singles throughout 2014-2016. After these initial singles, Wayuhi released his first and second EPs, Sonic Serenades and Pretty Pink Tapes in 2016. The last piece of this time period was the single, "Faud's Outro", which was a song dedicated to Wayuhi's late friend and collaborator. Wayuhi's songs prior to 2017 are not available on his Spotify or Apple Music pages.

=== 2017-2019: Part-Time Indian and Scatterbrain ===
Wayuhi continued to publish singles going into 2017. He released four different singles and then, in 2018, "Beeswax", which would be a song featured on his first album. Said album, Part-Time Indian (2018), was named after the novel The Absolutely True Diary of a Part-Time Indian by Sherman Alexie, reflecting the album's overall themes. This album is partially why Mato Wayuhi became the composer for Reservation Dogs, with director, Sterlin Harjo reaching out to Wayuhi after listening to Part-Time Indian. The song, "Stone Cold Lover" on Part-Time Indian brought new interest to Wayuhi's music as well, having over 200,000 streams on Spotify. Wayuhi wrote that the music video for "Stone Cold Lover" was even shown to the cast of Reservation Dogs by Harjo.

In 2018, Wayuhi with the band, Treehorse, entered the single, "Wildberry Poptart" to NPR's Tiny Desk Contest. The song did not win but, received a shout out. Over the next year, Wayuhi would put out "Hooky!" and "Come See Me Live", the former featuring the artist, AWU! who Wayuhi has worked with often. These two singles led up to Wayuhi's second album, Scatterbrain (2019). Along with the previously mentioned AWU! and Treehorse, Scatterbrain also featured Moon Allure and Ayoni.

=== 2020-present ===
Mato Wayuhi contributed music to the soundtrack of Vow of Silence: The Assassination of Annie Mae (2024), a 4-episode television series about Anna Mae Aquash.

== Awards/appearances ==
Wayuhi received a shoutout by NPR's Tiny Desk in 2018 for his entry “Wildberry Poptart” backed by the band Treehorse. Pillar Fitzgerald, then assistant manager of Tiny Desk Concert, described his song as “a critique of the traditional American dream, direct from the mouth of the oppressed.”

Wayuhi received critical acclaim for his 2024 album STANKFACE STANDING SOLDIER and was also featured in the 2023 publication of Forbes 30 under 30. In film and television, Wayuhi has also made name for himself, scoring and acting in the television series Reservation Dogs. He co-wrote the music for the film War Pony, which was featured at the 2022 Cannes Film Festival and won best first feature. Wayuhi also makes an appearance in the 2025 show The Lowdown as the character Chutto McIntosh.

== Discography ==
=== Studio albums ===
- BYGONER - 2025
- STANKFACE STANDING SOLDIER - 2024
- Pleasure - 2021
- Scatterbrain - 2019
- Part-Time Indian - 2018

=== Soundtrack albums ===
- Reservation Dogs (Original Soundtrack) - 2021
- Reservation Dogs: Season 2 (Original Soundtrack) - 2022
- Reservation Dogs: The Final Season (Original Soundtrack) - 2023

=== Singles ===
- Leftovers - 2025
- Mischief - 2025
- Sundowner - 2025
- Constellations (REMIX) - 2025
- FEE FI FO FUM (feat. Black Belt Eagle Scout) - 2024
- NAMESAKE - 2024
- VEILS - 2023
- The Roof (From “Disney Launchpad: Season Two”/Original Soundtrack) - 2023
- KETCHUP POTATO CHIPS (feat. Black Belt Eagle Scout) - 2023
- BOOGEY BOY (feat. Niandra Blonde) - 2023
- FALL OUT BOY - 2023
- STANKFACE (feat. A$h Da Hunter) - 2023
- Constellations - 2021
- The Ends - 2021
- Overwhelmed - 2020
- Come See Me Live - 2019
- Hooky! (feat. Awu & Ayoni) - 2019
- Beeswax - 2018
- Fly With Ya (feat. Your Grandparents & The Moon) - 2018
- Roam - 2017
- Salmon - 2017
- Blossom - 2017

== Filmography ==
=== Television ===
Year	Title	Role	Notes
2023	Reservation Dogs	Young Bucky	Season 3, Episode 5, special appearance
2025	The Lowdown	Chutto McIntosh	Season 1, Episodes 2, 4, 6, 8,

=== Music videos ===
Year	Music Video	Length	Album	Director(s)
2018	Beeswax	4:12	Part-Time Indian	Ryan Chavez, Mato Wayuhi
2018	Stone Cold Lover	3:52	Part-Time Indian	Mato Wayuhi
2019	Hooky! feat. A.W.U and Ayoni	4:34	Hooky! (Single)	Taylor Willis
2019	Come See Me Live	4:10	Scatterbrain	Daze Cornejo
2021	Constellations	3:56	Pleasure	Daze Cornejo
2021	Pleasure	1:01	Pleasure	Mato Wayuhi
2021	Down2earth	2:50	The Ends (Single)	Mato Wayuhi
2023	STANKFACE feat. A$h Da Hunter	5:08	STANKFACE (Single)	Mato Wayuhi
2023	Fall Out Boy	4:35	Fall Out Boy (Single)	Fox Maxy
2023	BOOGEY BOY feat. Niandra Blonde	2:30	BOOGEY BOY (Single)	Mato Wayuhi
2024	NAMESAKE (with Xiuhtezcatl)	2:48	NAMESAKE (Single)	
2024	FEE FI FO FUM feat. Black Belt Eagle Scout	2:37	FEE FI FO FUM (Single)	Mato Wayuhi
2025	THE SUNROOF SONG	3:35	Sundowner (Single)	Mato Wayuhi
2025	Leftovers feat. Black Belt Eagle Scout	2:49	Leftovers (Single)	Mato Wayuhi

== Publications ==
- "Tory" in My Life: Growing up Native in America New York: MTV Entertainment Books ISBN 9781668021729
