= Scott Shepherd (actor) =

American actor

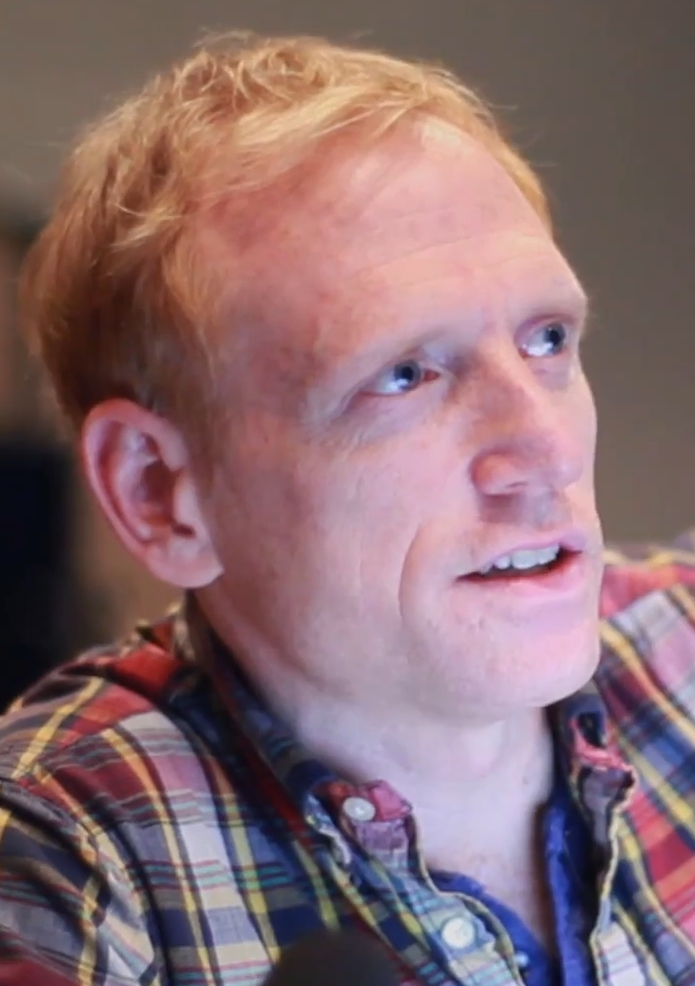
- Shepherd in 2015
- Born: May 30, 1968 (age 58); Raleigh, North Carolina, U.S.
- Occupation: Actor
- Years active: 1995–present

Scott Shepherd is an American film, theater, and television actor. He is best known for his roles in the films Bridge of Spies (2015), Jason Bourne (2016), El Camino: A Breaking Bad Movie (2019), and Killers of the Flower Moon (2023).

== Career ==
Shepherd began his acting career in theater. He has appeared in several productions of The Wooster Group and is also known for his work as narrator in the play Gatz by Elevator Repair Service, for which he won an Obie Award.

In 2014, Shepherd appeared in the comedy film And So It Goes as Luke, along with Michael Douglas, Diane Keaton, and Sterling Jerins. Rob Reiner directed the film, which was released on July 25, 2014. In 2015, Shepherd played a supporting role of a CIA operative named Hoffman in the Cold War-era spy film Bridge of Spies opposite Tom Hanks and Mark Rylance. The film was directed by Steven Spielberg and was released on October 16, 2015, by Walt Disney Studios Motion Pictures.

Shepherd also played the role of Cardinal Dussolier in the HBO series The Young Pope along with Jude Law. He appeared in the political drama film Norman along with Richard Gere. Shepherd had a supporting role as Director of National Intelligence, opposite Matt Damon, in the thriller film Jason Bourne, which was released on July 29, 2016.

In June 2024, Shepherd starred in Elevator Repair Service's adaptation of James Joyce's Ulysses, which had its world premiere at Bard College. In addition to being credited as co-director and dramaturgist, Shepherd played Buck Mulligan and Blazes Boylan.

== Personal life ==
In 2012, Shepherd dated actress Marin Ireland when the couple both worked for a Wooster Group production of Troilus and Cressida in London. During this period, the two physically fought at home. Ireland later appeared at rehearsals with a black eye. Ireland later expressed disappointment that the Wooster Group did not do more to support her.

== Filmography ==
=== Film ===
Year	Title	Role
1995	Throwing Down	Wade
2011	Brief Reunion	Teddy
2011	Meanwhile	Joe's Brother
2013	Side Effects	NYPD Detective
2014	And So It Goes	Luke
2015	The Family Fang	Art Critic
2015	Bridge of Spies	Hoffman
2015	Ithaca	Corbett
2016	Jason Bourne	Director of National Intelligence Edwin Russell
2016	Norman	Bruce Schwartz
2017	Hostiles	Wesley Quaid
2018	Radium Girls	Mr. Leech
2019	The Report	Senator Mark Udall
2019	Dark Phoenix	John Grey
2019	First Cow	Captain
2019	El Camino: A Breaking Bad Movie	Casey
2020	Slow Machine	Gerard
2023	Killers of the Flower Moon	Byron Burkhart
2025	The Rivals of Amziah King	Jimmy
2025	The Phoenician Scheme	Field Reporter

=== Television ===
Year	Title	Role	Notes
2016	The Young Pope	Cardinal Dussolier	8 episodes
2017	Elementary	Anson Gephardt	2 episodes
2017	Wormwood	Lt. Col. Vincent Ruwet	5 episodes
2019	True Detective	Harris James	4 episodes
2019	Bluff City Law	George Bell	10 episodes
2020	Prodigal Son	Dr. Simon Coppenrath	Episode: "Internal Affairs"
2022	The Good Fight	Brian Goner	Episode: "The End of Everything"
2023	The Last of Us	David	Episode: "When We Are in Need"
2025	The Lowdown	Allen Murphy	Ongoing series
