= Ryan Kiera Armstrong =

American actress (born 2010)

- Born: March 10, 2010 (age 16); New York City, U.S.
- Other name: Ryan Armstrong
- Occupation: Actress
- Years active: 2017–present
- Father: Dean Armstrong

Ryan Kiera Armstrong (born March 10, 2010) is an American actress who gained recognition for her recurring roles on the Canadian series Anne with an E (2017–2019) and the Star Wars series Star Wars: Skeleton Crew (2024). She also starred in the films Firestarter (2022), Wildflower (2022), The Old Way (2023) and the anthology series American Horror Story: Red Tide (2021).

== Early life ==
Armstrong was born in New York City to Canadian parents Dr. Berta Bacic and actor Dean Armstrong; she is the youngest of five children.

== Career ==
Armstrong made her screen debut as Minnie May Barry in the TV series Anne with an E from 2017 to 2019. At the age of eight, she made her film debut in the drama film The Art of Racing in the Rain, starring Kevin Costner, Milo Ventimiglia, Amanda Seyfried and Gary Cole.

In 2022, Armstrong played the title character in Firestarter. She was nominated for the Golden Raspberry Award for Worst Actress at the 43rd Golden Raspberry Awards, but public backlash due to her being 12 at the time led to the nomination being withdrawn, an apology from the Razzies, and a rule change banning minors from being nominated.

In 2024, Armstrong played the role of Fern in the Disney+ science-fiction television series Star Wars: Skeleton Crew.

In May 2025, Armstrong was cast as the lead in the Buffy the Vampire Slayer reboot at Hulu. On March 14, 2026, it was announced that Hulu decided to pass on the pilot.

== Filmography ==
Key
†	Denotes films that have not yet been released

=== Film ===
Year	Title	Role	Notes
2019	The Art of Racing in the Rain	Zoe Swift	Film debut
2019	It Chapter Two	Victoria Fuller	
2020	The Glorias	Gloria Steinem (young)	
2020	Wish Upon a Unicorn	Mia Dindal	
2021	Black Widow	Young Antonia	
2021	The Tomorrow War	Young Muri Forester	
2022	Firestarter	Charlie McGee	
2022	Wildflower	Young Bea	
2023	The Old Way	Brooke	

=== Television ===
Year	Title	Role	Notes
2017–2019	Anne with an E	Minnie May Barry	Recurring role, 16 episodes
2018	The Truth About the Harry Quebert Affair	Young Nola Kellergan	Miniseries, 2 episodes
2021	American Horror Story: Red Tide	Alma Gardner	Main role, 6 episodes
2024	Star Wars: Skeleton Crew	Fern	Main role, 8 episodes
2025	Stick	Angela	2 episodes
2025–present	The Lowdown	Francis	Recurring role (season 1); main role (season 2)
2025	Buffy the Vampire Slayer: New Sunnydale	Nova	Unaired pilot
