= Jeanne Tripplehorn =

American actress

- Tripplehorn c. 1980
- Born: June 10, 1963 (age 63); Tulsa, Oklahoma, U.S.
- Education: University of Tulsa; Juilliard School (BFA)
- Occupation: Actress
- Years active: 1990–present
- Spouse: Leland Orser (m. 2000)
- Children: 1

Jeanne Tripplehorn (born June 10, 1963) is an American actress. She began her career on stage, acting in several plays throughout the early 1990s, including Anton Chekhov's Three Sisters on Broadway. Her film career began with the role of a police psychologist in the erotic thriller Basic Instinct (1992). Her other film roles include The Firm (1993), Waterworld (1995) and Sliding Doors (1998). On television, she starred as Barbara Henrickson on the HBO drama series Big Love (2006–2011) and as Dr. Alex Blake on the CBS police drama Criminal Minds (2012–2014), and she received a Primetime Emmy Award nomination for her performance as Jacqueline Kennedy Onassis in the 2009 HBO movie Grey Gardens.

== Early life ==
Tripplehorn was born on June 10, 1963, in Tulsa, Oklahoma, the daughter of Suzanne Ferguson and Tom Tripplehorn, who was once a guitarist with Gary Lewis & the Playboys. Her parents divorced when she was two years old. She graduated from Edison High School in 1981 and spent one semester studying at the University of Tulsa. She performed on the local television shows Creature Feature (1982–83) and Night Shift (1983). She also worked part-time, then full-time on local rock radio station KMOD for several years before leaving for Juilliard. She then attended the Juilliard School's Drama Division as a member of Group 19 (1986–1990), which also included Laura Linney.

== Career ==
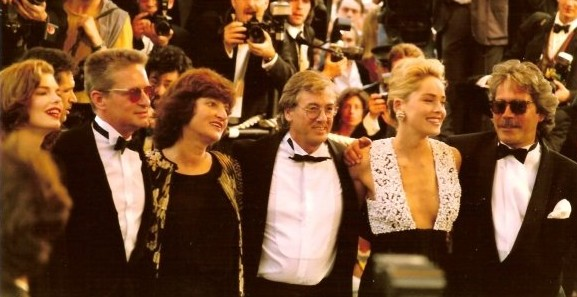
Tripplehorn (furthest left) with the cast and director of Basic Instinct at Cannes in 1992

Tripplehorn began her career on stage. She appeared Off-Broadway in John Patrick Shanley's The Big Funk in 1990, then co-starred with Val Kilmer in a 1993 production of John Ford's 1630s play 'Tis Pity She's a Whore. She has also been on Broadway in Anton Chekhov's Three Sisters opposite Amy Irving and Lili Taylor. In 1992, she made her film debut, in a supporting role in the erotic thriller Basic Instinct. The following year, she appeared as Abby McDeere opposite Tom Cruise in The Firm and in 1995 had another lead role alongside Kevin Costner in Waterworld. As lead actress, she starred in the 1997 box-office bomb 'Til There Was You. The next few years she had supporting roles in small films, including Office Killer, Monument Ave., and Sliding Doors; and in 1999 appeared opposite Hugh Grant in the British romantic comedy Mickey Blue Eyes. She was cast opposite Madonna in the 2002 film Swept Away.

In 2006, Tripplehorn was cast in a leading role as Barbara Henrickson in the HBO drama series Big Love, opposite Bill Paxton, regarded as the most successful role of her career. In 2009, she played Jacqueline Kennedy Onassis in the HBO movie Grey Gardens. She was nominated for a Primetime Emmy Award for Outstanding Supporting Actress in a Miniseries or a Movie for this performance. In 2011, she appeared in Five, a movie on the Lifetime television network. In July 2012, Tripplehorn joined the cast of CBS procedural Criminal Minds in season eight, replacing Paget Brewster's character Emily Prentiss. She received a six-figure salary per episode of Criminal Minds. She left the series after two seasons and Jennifer Love Hewitt replaced her as a new agent.

Tripplehorn has appeared in the independent films Little Pink House (2017), with Catherine Keener, and Gloria Bell (2018), starring Julianne Moore. In 2020, she returned to television in the Hulu miniseries Mrs. America opposite Cate Blanchett, Sarah Paulson, Rose Byrne, Tracey Ullman and Margo Martindale. She was later cast in a recurring role in the HBO period drama series The Gilded Age starring Christine Baranski and Cynthia Nixon.

== Personal life ==
Tripplehorn married actor Leland Orser in 2000, with whom she had co-starred in the 1998 dark comedy Very Bad Things. They have a son named August.

== Filmography ==
=== Film ===
Year	Title	Role	Notes
1992	Basic Instinct	Dr. Beth Garner	
1993	The Night We Never Met	Pastel	
1993	The Firm	Abby McDeere	
1994	Reality Bites	Cheryl Goode	Uncredited
1995	Waterworld	Helen	
1997	'Til There Was You	Gwen Moss	
1997	Office Killer	Norah Reed	
1998	Monument Ave.	Annie	
1998	Sliding Doors	Lydia	
1998	Very Bad Things	Lois Berkow	
1999	Mickey Blue Eyes	Gina Vitale	
2000	Steal This Movie!	Johanna Lawrenson	
2000	Timecode	Lauren Hathaway	
2000	Paranoid	Rachel	
2000	Relative Values	Miranda Frayle / Freda Birch	
2002	Swept Away	Marina	
2005	The Amateurs	Thelma	
2007	The Trap	Maggie	Short film
2008	Winged Creatures	Doris Hagen	
2010	Crazy on the Outside	Angela Papadopolous	
2010	Morning	Alice	
2013	A Perfect Man	Nina	
2017	Little Pink House	Charlotte Wells	
2018	We Only Know So Much	Jean Copeland	
2018	Gloria Bell	Fiona	
2020	Ana	Pastor Helen	

=== Television ===
Year	Title	Role	Notes
1991	The Perfect Tribute	Julia	Movie
1992	The Ben Stiller Show	The Wilson Woman / Goo	3 episodes
1996	Mr. Show with Bob and David	Stone Throwing Singer in 'Jeepers Creepers'	Episode: "The Biggest Failure in Broadway History"
1997	Old Man	Addie Rebecca Brice	Movie
2002	Brother's Keeper	Lucinda Pond	Movie
2003	Word of Honor	Maj. Karen Harper	Movie
2003	Frasier	Chelsea	Episode: "Trophy Girlfriend"
2006–2011	Big Love	Barbara Henrickson	Main role, 53 episodes Nominated – Satellite Award for Best Actress – Television Series Drama (2006 and 2007); Nominated — Women's Image Network Award for Best Actress Drama Series (2010)
2009	Grey Gardens	Jacqueline Kennedy Onassis	Movie; Nominated – Primetime Emmy Award for Outstanding Supporting Actress in a Miniseries or a Movie; Nominated — OFTA Television Award for Best Supporting Actress in a Motion Picture or Miniseries
2011	Five	Pearl	Movie; Nominated — Women's Image Network Award for Best Actress in a Made for Television Movie
2012	New Girl	Ouli	Episodes: "Kids" and "Tomatoes"
2012	Blue	Vera	Episode: "A Decent Girl"
2012	Electric City	Hope Chatsworth (voice)	17 episodes
2012–2014	Criminal Minds	Dr. Alex Blake	Main role (seasons 8–9), 48 episodes
2019	Undone	Beth Hollingsworth	4 episodes
2019	BoJack Horseman	Joan Tripplehorn (voice)	Episode: "A Horse Walks into a Rehab"
2020	Mrs. America	Eleanor Schlafly	Miniseries
2022	The Gilded Age	Sylvia Chamberlain	6 episodes
2022	The Terminal List	Lorraine Hartley	7 episodes
2025	The Lowdown	Betty Jo Washberg	Recurring role
