= Cody Lightning =

Cree actor and filmmaker

Cody Lightning (born August 8, 1986) is a Cree actor and filmmaker from Edmonton, Treaty 6, Alberta, Canada. He is the son of film director and actress Georgina Lightning and brother of actors Crystle Lightning and William Lightning. He was a Young Artist Award nominee in 1999 for Best Performance in a Feature Film - Supporting Young Actor, for Smoke Signals (1998), and won the American Indian Film Festival award for Best Actor in 2007 for Four Sheets to the Wind.

In 2023, he wrote, directed and starred in his directorial debut film Hey, Viktor!, a mockumentary in which a fictionalized version of himself struggles to reestablish his faded career as an actor by creating his own sequel to Smoke Signals. In 2024, he received two Canadian Screen Award nominations for his work on the film, for Best Lead Performance in a Comedy Film and Best Original Screenplay, at the 12th Canadian Screen Awards.

His second feature film, Smudge the Blades, premiered at the 2026 Toronto International Film Festival, where it won the Best Canadian Discovery Award.

== Selected filmography ==
Year	Film	Role	Notes
1993	Geronimo	Young Daklugie	TV movie
1997	The Brave	Frankie	
1998	Smoke Signals	Young Victor Joseph	Nominated—Young Artist Award for Best Performance in a Feature Film - Supporting Young Actor
1999	Pepper Ann	Dave (voice)	Episode: "Dances with Ignorance/Girl Power"
1999	The Wild Thornberrys	Jim (voice)	Episode: "Tamper Proof Seal"
2001	Manic	Kenny	
2003	Dreamkeeper	Sixth Brother	
2005	Brick	The Lug	
2007	Four Sheets to the Wind	Cufe Smallhill	American Indian Film Festival for Best Actor
2008	Older than America	Dwayne	
2021	Run Woman Run	Mike	
2023	Hey, Viktor!	Cody	Also director, writer
2024	Echo	Cousin Biscuits	
2024	Rez Ball	Micah Tso	
2025	The Lowdown	Waylon	Recurring role
2026	Smudge the Blades	Willie Gladue	Also director, writer
