= Waste (disambiguation) =

Waste is unwanted or undesired material.

Waste, WASTE or W.A.S.T.E. may also refer to:

== Arts, entertainment, and media ==
=== Music ===
==== Groups and organizations ====
- W.A.S.T.E., the official merchandise store and newsletter for Radiohead and affiliated projects
- W.A.S.T.E. (band), an American band

==== Songs ====
- "Waste", a song by Lily Allen from No Shame
- "Waste", a song from the album Billy Breathes by the rock band Phish
- "Waste", a song by Seether from Finding Beauty in Negative Spaces
- "Waste", a song by Staind from Break the Cycle
- "Waste", a song by Brockhampton from Saturation
- "Waste (Dove Cameron song)", a song by Dove Cameron
- "Waste", a song by KMFDM from Symbols
- "Waste", a song by Smash Mouth from Astro Lounge

=== Other arts, entertainment, and media ===
- Waste (play), a 1906 play by Harley Granville-Barker
- W.A.S.T.E. (We Await Silent Tristero's Empire), the underground postal service in Thomas Pynchon's 1966 novel The Crying of Lot 49
- The Wasting, a 2017 movie
- The Wastes, a mod for the video game Half-Life

== Computing ==
- WASTE, a piece of software for establishing friend-to-friend (dark P2P) file sharing networks
- WASTE text engine, a multilingual text-handling library for the Mac OS

== Other uses ==
- Waste (law), a legal term concerning property
- Binding waste, damaged, misprinted, or surplus paper used in bookbinding
- Metabolic waste, any unwanted substances that are expelled from living organisms
- Waste of energy: the opposite of environmental energy conservation
- Waste types
- Waste heat

== See also ==
- Garbage
- Road apple (disambiguation), a term for animal feces, often on a road and/or from a horse
- Muda (Japanese term), a Japanese term for "waste", as used in lean manufacturing and agile software development
- Waist (disambiguation)
- Wasted (disambiguation)
- Wasteland (disambiguation)
- Wasting, the process by which a debilitating disease causes muscle and fat tissue to waste away
- Wasting Time (disambiguation)
