= Waste My Time =

Waste My Time may refer to:

- "Waste My Time", a song by Ari Lennox from Age/Sex/Location (2022)
- "Waste My Time", a song by Blutengel from Leitbild
- "Waste My Time", a song by Bedlight for Blue Eyes
- "Avail", a formerly unidentified song by The Burns previously referred to as "Waste My Time"
- "Waste My Time", a single by Citizen Queen
- "Waste My Time", a song by Findlay from Forgotten Pleasures
- "Waste My Time", a single by Grace VanderWaal
- "Waste My Time", a song by Jeremy McKinnon
- "Waste My Time", a single by Renaida Braun
- "Waste My Time", a single by Benjamin Ingrosso

== See also ==
- Time (disambiguation)
- Wasted Time (disambiguation)
- Wasting Time (disambiguation)
- Wasting My Time (disambiguation)
