= Wasteland =

Wasteland or waste land may refer to:

- Desert or barren area
- an uncultivated area of land, whether wooded or not, whether common land or not

== Arts, entertainment, and media ==
=== Comics ===
- Wasteland (DC Comics), 1987–1989 anthology-style horror/humor comic by John Ostrander and Del Close
- Wasteland (comics), 2006–2015 comic book series by Antony Johnston and Christopher Mitten
- Wastelands, setting of Old Man Logan and its several spin-offs, since 2008
- Marvel's Wastelanders, 2021 ongoing series of radio drama podcasts produced by SiriusXM

=== Fictional entities ===
- Wasteland (Warhammer), a fictional region in the world of Warhammer Fantasy
- Wasteland, the post-Great War United States in the Fallout series of video games
- Wasteland, a world in which Epic Mickey and Epic Mickey 2: The Power of Two take place

=== Films ===
- Wasteland (1960 film), a 1960 French film directed by Marcel Carné, based on Hal Ellson's novel Tomboy
- Waste Land (film), a 2010 documentary about Brazilian trash-pickers
- Wasteland, North American title of the 2012 British film The Rise
- Wasteland (2013 film), a zombie horror film
- Mad Max: The Wasteland, a prospective film in the Mad Max franchise
- The Wasteland (2020 film), an Iranian drama film
- The Wasteland (2021 film), a Spanish horror drama film

=== Games ===
- Wasteland (video game series), a role-playing video game series created by Brian Fargo
  - Wasteland (video game), a 1988 computer role-playing game
  - Wasteland 2, a 2014 sequel to the above game
  - Wasteland 3, 2020 sequel
- Wasteland Half-Life, a mod for the 1998 video game Half-Life

=== Literature ===
- Wasteland (mythology), the Celtic motif of the land of the Fisher King
- Wasteland (novel), a 2003 novel by Francesca Lia Block
- "Wastelands" (short story), a 2002 short story by Stephen Dedman
- The Dark Tower III: The Waste Lands, a 1991 novel by Stephen King
- The Waste Land, a 1922 poem by T. S. Eliot
- Wastelands: Stories of the Apocalypse, a 2008 anthology of post-apocalyptic fiction

=== Music ===
==== Albums ====
- Wasteland (The Jam album), 1992
- The Waste Lands (album), a 1992 album by Venom
- Wasteland (Atargatis album), 2006
- Grace/Wastelands, a 2009 album by Pete Doherty
- Wastelands (album), a 2013 album by Eskimo Joe
- Wasteland (Riverside album), 2018
- Wasteland (Brent Faiyaz album), 2022
- Wasteland (Wolves at the Gate album), 2025

==== Songs ====
- "Wasteland" (Billy Idol song), 1993
- "Wasteland" (Poison song), 2002
- "Wasteland" (10 Years song), 2005
- "Wasteland" (Maxïmo Park song), 2005
- "Wasteland" (The View song), 2007
- "Wasteland" (Needtobreathe song), 2014
- "Wasteland" (Seether song), 2021
- "Wasteland", a song by Against the Current from the album In Our Bones
- "Wasteland", a song by All That Remains from the album Victim of the New Disease
- "Wasteland", a song by Bury Tomorrow from the album Will You Haunt Me, with That Same Patience
- "Wasteland", a song by Chelsea Grin from the album Desolation of Eden
- "Wasteland", a song by The Jam from the album Setting Sons
- "Wasteland", a song by John Cale from the album blackAcetate
- "Wasteland", a song by The Mission from the album God's Own Medicine
- "Wasteland", a song by Royal & the Serpent from the album Arcane League of Legends: Season 2
- "Wasteland", a song by Shadows Fall from the album Fire from the Sky
- "Wasteland (Vechnost)", a song by Silent Planet from the album The Night God Slept
- "Wasteland", a song by Trapt from the album Only Through the Pain
- "Wasteland", a song by X Ambassadors from Orion
- "Wasteland", a song by Royal & the Serpent from the Arcane soundtrack
- "Wastelands" (Linkin Park song), 2014
- "Wastelands" (Suede song), 2018
- "Wastelands", a song by Amoral from the album Beneath
- "Wastelands", a song by Avantasia from the album The Wicked Symphony
- "Wastelands", a song by Extol from the album Extol
- "Wastelands", a song by Hawkwind from the album Alien 4
- "Wastelands", a song by Midge Ure from the album The Gift
- "The Wasteland" (Elton John song), 2001
- "A Waste Land", a song by Bryan Ferry from the album Boys and Girls
- "The Waste Land", a song by Weezer from the album Everything Will Be Alright in the End

=== Television ===
- Wasteland (American TV series), an American television drama, debuted in 1999
- Wasteland (Czech TV series), a Czech television series
- Wasteland Speech, a 1961 speech by FCC chairman Newton N. Minow

== Other uses ==
- Wasteland (event), a bi-annual fetish event held in Amsterdam, the Netherlands
- Wasteland Weekend, an immersive post apocalyptic event held annually in the Mojave Desert since 2010

== See also ==
- Wastelanding, a 2015 book by Traci Brynne Voyles
- Waste (disambiguation)
