= Uranium mining and the Navajo people =

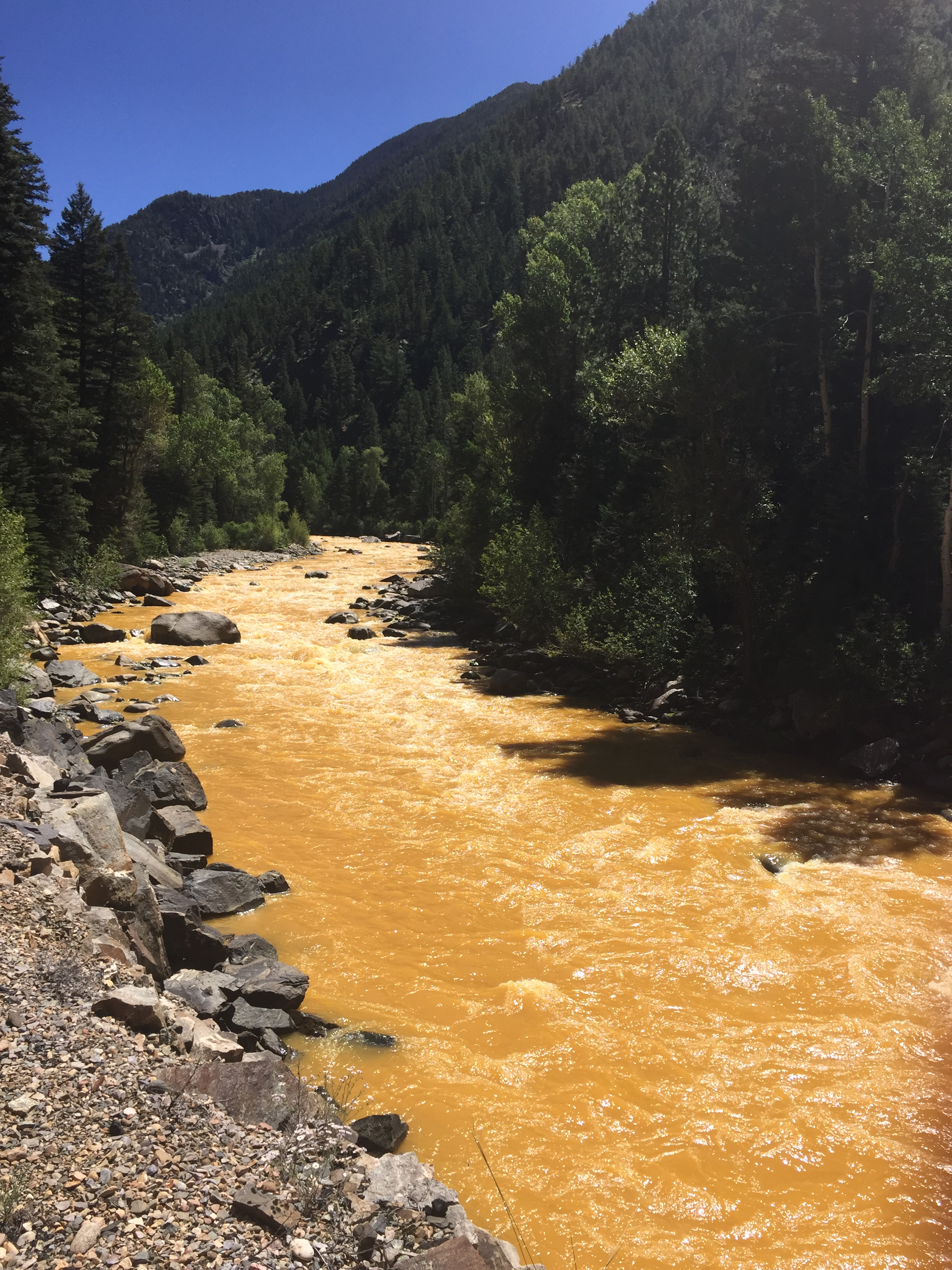
Acid mine drainage in Animas river following the Gold King Mine Spill

The relationship between uranium mining and the Navajo people began in 1944 in northeastern Arizona, northwestern New Mexico, and southeastern Utah.

In the 1950s, the production started booming as Navajo Nation was situated directly in the uranium mining belt that experienced a boom in production, and many residents found work in the mines. Prior to 1962, the risks of lung cancer due to uranium mining were unknown to the workers, and the lack of a word for radiation in the Navajo language left the miners unaware of the associated health hazards.

The Navajo Nation was affected by the United States' largest radioactive accident during the Church Rock uranium mill spill in 1979 when a tailings pond upstream from Navajo County breached its dam and sent radioactive waste down the Puerco River, injuring people and killing livestock. The cultural significance of water for the Navajo people and the environmental damage to both the land and livestock inhibits the ability of the Navajo people to practice their culture.

On the Navajo Nation, approximately 15% of people do not have access to running water. Navajo Nation residents are often forced to resort to unregulated water sources that are susceptible to bacteria, fecal matter, and uranium. Extensive uranium mining in the region during the mid-20th century is a contemporary concern because of contamination of these commonly used sources, in addition to the lingering health effects of exposure from mining.

Water on the Navajo Nation currently has an average of 90 micrograms per liter of uranium, with some areas reaching upwards of 700 micrograms per liter. In contrast, the Environmental Protection Agency (EPA) considers 30 micrograms per liter the safe amount of uranium to have in water sources. Health impacts of uranium consumption include kidney damage and failure, as kidneys are unable to filter uranium out of the bloodstream. There is an average rate of End Stage Renal Disease of 0.63% in the Navajo Nation, a rate significantly higher than the national average of 0.19%.

The U.S. Environmental Protection Agency (EPA) has been cleaning up uranium mines on the Navajo Nation since as part of settlements through the Superfund since 1994. The Abandoned Mine Land program and Contaminated Structures Program have facilitated the cleanup of mines and demolition of structures built with radioactive materials. Criticisms of unfair, inefficient treatment have been made repeatedly of EPA by Navajos and journalists.

In October 2021, the Inter-American Commission on Human Rights agreed to hear a case filed by the Eastern Navajo Diné Against Uranium Mining, which accused the United States government of violating the human rights of Navajo Nation members. Environmental journalist Cody Nelson explains further that: "the US government and its Nuclear Regulatory Commission (NRC) have violated their human rights by licensing uranium mines in their communities" (Nelson, "Ignored for 70 Years': Human Rights Group to Investigate Uranium Contamination on Navajo Nation"). Nelson also describes that "There is moral value in having an international human rights body lay bare the abuses of the nuclear industry and the US government's complicity in those abuses."

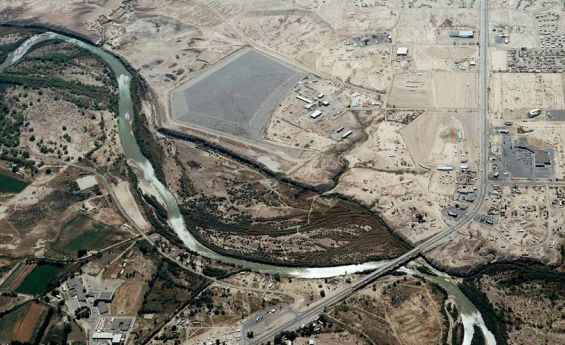
Shiprock, New Mexico uranium mill aerial photo

== History ==
In 1944, uranium mining under the U.S military's Manhattan Project began on Navajo Nation lands and on Lakota Nation lands. On August 1, 1946, the responsibility for atomic science and technology was transferred from the military to the United States Atomic Energy Commission. Authors Dr. Doug Brugge and Dr. Rob Goble from the National Library of Medicine explain that "After its initial dependence on foreign sources, the US Atomic Energy Commission (AEC) announced in 1948 that it would guarantee a price for and purchase all uranium ore mined in the United States. This initiated a mining "boom" on the Colorado Plateau in New Mexico, Utah, Colorado, and Arizona that replaced a more limited mining industry centered first on radium and then vanadium, which are found in the same easy-to-mine, soft sandstone ore. The US government remained, by law, the sole purchaser of uranium in the United States until 1971, but private companies operated the mines" (Brugge and Goble, "The History of Uranium Mining and the Navajo People"). Widespread uranium mining began on Navajo and Lakota lands in a nuclear arms race with the Soviet Union throughout the Cold War.

Large uranium deposits were mined on and near the Navajo Reservation in the Southwest, and these were developed through the 20th century. Absent much environmental regulation prior to the founding of the Environmental Protection Agency in 1970 and passage of related laws, the mining endangered thousands of Navajo workers, as well as producing contamination that has persisted in adversely affecting air and water quality, and contaminating Navajo lands.

Private companies hired thousands of Navajo men to work the uranium mines. Disregarding the known health risks of exposure to uranium, the private companies and the United States Atomic Energy Commission failed to inform the Navajo workers about the dangers and to regulate the mining to minimize contamination. As more data was collected, they were slow to take appropriate action for the workers.

In 1951, the U.S. Public Health Service began a human testing experiment on Navajo miners, without their informed consent, during the federal government's study of the long term health effects from radiation poisoning. Navajo pathologist Phillida A. Charley states that "The Navajo miners were never told about the health or environmental effects of mining uranium" and that "Some miners took rocks from the mines to build their homes or chimneys" (Charley, "Walking in Beauty A Navajo scientist confronts the legacy of uranium mining"). The Navajo miners continued to work, unaware of the experiment, nor the significant health impacts. In 1932, the USPHS began an earlier human testing experiment on African men in their Tuskegee syphilis experiment. The experiment on Navajo mine workers and their families documented high rates of cancers (including Xeroderma pigmentosum) and other diseases which manifested from uranium mining and milling contamination. For decades, industry and the government failed to regulate or improve conditions, or inform workers of the dangers. As high rates of illness began to occur, workers were often unsuccessful in court cases seeking compensation, and the states at first did not officially recognize radon illness. In 1990, the US Congress passed the Radiation Exposure Compensation Act, to address cases of uranium poisoning and provide needed compensation, but Navajo Nation applicants provide evidence RECA requirements prevent access to necessary compensation. Congressional modifications to RECA application requirements were made in 2000, and were introduced in 2017 and in 2018.

Since 1988, the Navajo Nation's Abandoned Mine Lands program reclaims mines and cleans mining sites, but significant problems from the legacy of uranium mining and milling persist today on the Navajo Nation and in the states of Utah, Colorado, New Mexico, and Arizona. More than a thousand abandoned mines have not been contained and cleaned up, and these present environmental and health risks in Navajo communities. The Environmental Protection Agency estimates that there are 4000 mines with documented uranium production, and another 15,000 locations with uranium occurrences in 14 western states. Most are located in the Four Corners area and Wyoming.

The Uranium Mill Tailings Radiation Control Act (1978) is a United States environmental law that amended the Atomic Energy Act of 1954 and authorized the Environmental Protection Agency to establish health and environmental standards for the stabilization, restoration, and disposal of uranium mill waste. Cleanup has continued to be difficult, and EPA administers several Superfund sites located on the Navajo Nation.

On April 29, 2005, Navajo Nation President Joe Shirley Jr. signed the Diné Natural Resources Protection Act of 2005 that outlaws uranium mining and processing on Navajo Nation lands.

Pressure for uranium mining increased in the postwar years, when the United States developed resources to compete with the Soviet Union in the Cold War. In 1948, the United States Atomic Energy Commission (AEC) announced it would be the sole purchaser of any uranium mined in the United States, to cut off dependence on imported uranium. The AEC would not mine the uranium; it contracted with private mining companies for the product. The subsequent mining boom led to the creation of thousands of mines; 92% of all western mines were located on the Colorado Plateau because of regional resources.

The Navajo Nation encompasses portions of Arizona, New Mexico, and Utah, and their reservation was a key area for uranium mining. More than 1000 mines were established by leases in the reservation. From 1944 to 1986, an estimated 3,000 to 5,000 Navajo people worked in the uranium mines on their land. Other work was scarce on and near the reservation, and many Navajo men traveled miles to work in the mines, sometimes taking their families with them. Between 1944 and 1989, 3.9 million tons of uranium ore were mined from the mountains and plains.

In 1951, the US Public Health Service began a massive human medical experiment on approximately 4000 Navajo uranium miners, without their informed consent. Neither the miners nor their families were warned of the risks from nuclear radiation and contamination as USPHS continued their experiment. In 1955, USPHS took active control of Native American medical health services from the Bureau of Indian Affairs, and the experiments on nuclear radiation continued. In 1962 it published the first report to show a statistical correlation between cancer and uranium mining. The federal government finally regulated the standard amount of radon in mines, setting the level at .3 working level (WL) on January 1, 1969, but Navajo people attending mining schools before working in the mines were still not informed of the health risks from uranium poisoning in 1971. Reports continued to be published from USPHS's non-consensual medical experiments at least until 1998. The Environmental Protection Agency was established on December 2, 1970. But, environmental regulation could not repair the damage already suffered. Navajo miners contracted a variety of cancers including lung cancer at much higher rates than the rest of the U.S. population, and they have suffered higher rates of other lung diseases caused by breathing in radon.

Private companies resisted regulation through lobbying Congress and state legislatures. In 1990, the United States Congress finally passed the Radiation Exposure Compensation Act (RECA), granting reparations for those affected by the radiation. The act was amended in 2000 to address criticisms and problems with the original legislation.

The tribal council and Navajo delegates remained in control of mining decisions before the adverse health effects of mining were identified. No one fully understood the effect of radon exposure for miners, as there was insufficient data before the expansion of mining.

== Church Rock uranium mill spill ==
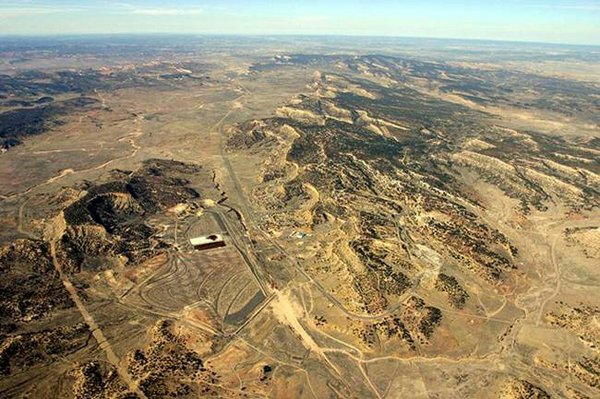
United Nuclear Corporation Church Rock Uranium Mill

On July 16, 1979, the tailings pond at United Nuclear Corporation's uranium mill in Church Rock, New Mexico, breached its dam. More than 1,000 tons of radioactive mill waste and 93 million gallons of acidic, radioactive tailings solution and mine effluent flowed into the Puerco River, and contaminants traveled 80 miles (130 km) downstream to Navajo County, Arizona. The flood backed up sewers, affected nearby aquifers and left stagnating, contaminated pools on the riverside. Professor and chair of the Department of Public Health and Sciences Health Net Inc., Dr. Doug Brugge explains that "residents in proximity to the mine site were almost entirely Navajo and relied on nearby Puerco River as a watering source for their livestock. In addition, local medicine men derived remedies from the native plants that grew along the riverbank, and children played in the river during hot summer months" (Brugge, "The Sequoyah Corporation Fuels Releases and the Church Rock Spill: Unpublicized Nuclear Releases in American Indian Communities"). The affected aquifers were primarily used by the Navajo Nation which had severe impacts on their health and way of life.

More radioactivity was released in the spill than in the Three Mile Island accident that occurred four months earlier. It has been reported as the largest radioactive accident in U.S. history.

The state contingency plan relied on English-only notification of the largely Navajo public populace affected by the spill. Local residents did not learn immediately of the toxic danger. The locals were accustomed to using the riverside for recreation and herb gathering. Residents who waded in the acidic water went to the hospital complaining of burning feet and were misdiagnosed with heat stroke. Sheep and cattle died en masse. Brugge states that "In August 1979, the chairman of the Navajo Tribal Council's Emergency Sercives Coordinating Committee sent a telegram to the Governor of New Mexico requesting that he declared a state of emergency and that McKinley County be declared a disaster area. The request was denied. It was the first of many denials for assistance, which resulted in significant downplay of a nuclear release" (Brugge, "The Sequoya Corporation Fuels Release and the Church Rock Spill: Unpublicized Nuclear Releases in American Indian Communities").This further limited the amount of disaster relief the Navajo Nation received.

For nearly two years, the state and federal government trucked in water to the reservation, but ended the program in 1981. Farmers had little choice but to resume use of the river for watering livestock and crops.

== Health studies on exposure to uranium ==
Concerned over the adverse health consequences which Europeans experienced from uranium mines, William Bale and John Harley conducted an independent study. Their work led the US government to start the United States Public Health Study (USPHS) on uranium mine workers. Bale and Harley's studies focused on identifying the level of radon in mines and assessing any correlation with disease, specifically lung cancer. Radon, they found, can attach to mine dust, which would be inhaled and subsequently concentrated in the lung tissue. Because of this action, workers breathed radon gas at concentrations up to 100 times higher than the amount of radon gas indicated. The USPHS was subsequently launched in 1951, with two goals: to identify uranium mine environment exposures, and to conduct a medical evaluation of the miners.

=== Ethical concerns ===
The USPHS study raised ethical concerns. The Navajo workers were rarely notified of the possible dangers which the USPHS was studying. As late as 1960, the USPHS medical consent form failed to inform miners about the possible health risks of working in the mine. The Advisory Committee on Human Radiation Experiments, created in 1994 to explore the treatment of the workers, said: "'Had they been better informed, they could have sought help in publicizing the fact that working conditions in the mines were extremely hazardous, which might have resulted in some mines being ventilated earlier than they were." The USPHS failed to abide by a centerpiece of Nuremberg Code (1947), by failing to have informed consent of the subjects of a research study.

In 1952, the USPHS issued two reports, reporting exceptionally high concentrations of radon in these uranium mines, even higher than those found in European mines years before. Medically, there was little evidence found of sickness. But, the latency from exposure to disease, also found among the European cases, explains why there were few medical effects observed at this early stage. In a private meeting between the AEC and the USPHS, the AEC informed the USPHS scientists that not only could the high radon levels eventually cause cancer, but proper ventilation of the mines could avoid the problem. The government failed to take any action on this finding.

=== Continued effects and research ===
The USPHS continued to study the uranium miners, eventually including 4,000 American Indian and non-Indian underground uranium miners. They added miners in 1951, 1953, 1954, 1957 and 1960. In 1962, the USPHS published the first account of the effects of radon exposure. It found a significant correlation between radon exposure and cancer. Additional studies were published in 1968, 1973, 1976, 1981, 1987, 1995 and 1997; these demonstrated linear relationships between radon exposure and lung cancer, a latency period of about 20 years between radon exposure and health effects, and noted that, while smoking tobacco caused a shorter latency period for the development of cancer, it did not fully explain the relationship between radon and cancer. Similar reports found instances of other diseases such as pneumoconiosis, tuberculosis, chronic obstructive pulmonary disease (COPD), as well as diseases of the blood. A 2000 study of the number of cancer cases among Navajo uranium mine workers concluded that the miners were 28.6 times more likely to contract the disease than the study's control group.

Many miners died from radiation-related illnesses. A 1995 report published by American Public Health Association found:

excess mortality rates for lung cancer, pneumoconioses and other respiratory diseases, and tuberculosis for Navajo uranium miners. Increasing duration of exposure to underground uranium mining was associated with increased mortality risk for all three diseases… The most important long-term mortality risks for the Navajo uranium miners continue to be lung cancer and pneumoconioses and other nonmalignant respiratory diseases.

Over the decades, Navajo miners extracted some four million tons of uranium ore, which was used by the U.S. government primarily to make nuclear weapons. Some miners, unaware of the adverse health effects, carried contaminated rocks and tailings from local mines to build their family homes. These were found to be contaminated, with the family at risk. In 2009, those homes began to be demolished and rebuilt under a new government program, which involved temporarily relocating occupants until the homes could be rebuilt.

Dr. Leon Gottlieb, a pulmonary specialist was the first physician that noted an increase in lung disorders among the Navajo uranium miners. He would later report in a 1982 study that showed of the 17 Navajos that were being observed for lung disorders in this case lung cancer, 16 of the Navajos were uranium miners. Along with studies regarding the correlation between uranium miners and lung cancer there have been other studies that suggest that miscarriages, birth defects, reproductive, bone and gastric cancer along with heart disease deaths have also been identified as related health effects of uranium mining (Churchill 1986, Gofman 1981, McLeod 1985). Even just living near a uranium mill mining area has been linked to birth defects among babies with mothers who live close to the mill, lung cancer, leukemia, cell damage, renal cancer, and stomach cancer . A study was conducted to compare residents who are close to the mining areas and those who are distant. The results show that the residents living near the mining areas suffered from:

- 1500% increase in testicular and ovarian cancer in children;
- 500% increase in bone cancer in children;
- 250% increase in leukemia;
- 200% increase in miscarriage, infant death, congenital defects, and learning disorders.

Dr. Joseph Wagoner, a health expert collected data regarding the health effects of uranium since 1960 for the US Public Health Service, would report that from 1960 to 1974 there were 144 cancer deaths among 3,500 miners, 700 to 800 of whom were Navajo. Statistically, approximately 30 deaths would have been expected instead of the 144 which were discovered (Bergman 1982). Apart from respiratory diseases and other significant health problems the American Indian communities experienced psycho-social problems, such as depression and anxiety. Residents near the uranium mills reported increased levels of anxiety due to their proximity to the uranium mills and the health hazards of their living conditions along with the lack of awareness among the workers as they would bring contaminated rocks back to their homes.

A study was conducted by the National University of General Martín, Avda Gral Paz to review the cellular consequences of the inhalation of uranium compounds. The accumulation of both insoluble and soluble uranium in macrophages (since macrophages are among the main cells to respond to internalized metallic particles) demonstrated that the exposure to both uranium compounds by inhalation resulted in the breakage of DNA strands along with an increase of inflammatory cytokines and hydro-peroxides production. This reviewed the molecular impacts of uranium contamination that could result in respiratory diseases (neoplasia and fibrosis).

== United States government response ==
Following the publication of the reports in the early 1950s, some private contractors attempted to properly ventilate their mines. The states of Colorado, New Mexico and Utah established minimum standards for radon concentrations (Dawson and Madsen 2007). But, the AEC was lax in enforcement of the rules; AEC commissioners did not establish national radon standards at the time the studies were released. The AEC said it had no authority to regulate uranium, but it regulated beryllium. The health and activist communities have criticized the AEC for its failure to take action related to the scientific reports. The agency repressed the reports.

Government and uranium industry personnel were privy to the information, but it was not until the 1960s that workers were informed of the environmental dangers. The government response continued to be slow. Regulation of the uranium industry was first debated in Congress in 1966, but little progress was made. Journalists began to publish stories detailing the illnesses of uranium miners, giving them public attention. In 1969, Congress set the standard radon level for mines at .3 WL.

Navajo miners began to file lawsuits to seek compensation for health damages, but often lost in court. But the publicity, presentation of harmful evidence, and victim testimony gave support to their cause. Ted Kennedy (D-MA) was the first senator to propose a Radiation Compensation bill, with the goal of avoiding lawsuits and compensating victims fully, though it was defeated in 1979. Orrin Hatch's (R-UT) 1981 compensation bill was met with a similar fate, and his attempt in 1983 did not reach the Senate floor.

=== Progress toward legislation ===
In 1989, Orrin Hatch, supported by fellow Utah Representative Wayne Owens (D-UT), sponsored the Radiation Exposure Compensation Act (RECA), which was signed into law by President George H. W. Bush on October 15, 1990. The Radiation Exposure Compensation Act (RECA): "Offers an apology and monetary compensation to individuals who contracted certain cancers and other serious diseases following their exposure to radiation released during above-ground atmospheric nuclear weapons tests or, following their occupational exposure to radiation while employed in the uranium industry during the build-up to the Cold War." The United States Department of Justice established regulations for implementing the act, related to individuals eligible for payment, and guidelines for identification, including marriage licenses, birth certificates and official documents, some of which the Navajo did not possess. In some cases, the government did not recognize individuals' documentation as legitimate.

With additional data from the studies by the Public Health Service (PHS), in 2000 the act was amended to correct shortcomings: "The RECA Amendments of 2000 broadened the scope of eligibility for benefits to include two new occupationally exposed claimant categories (uranium mill workers and uranium ore transporters), expanding both the time periods and geographic areas covered, and adding compensable diseases, thus allowing more individuals to be eligible to qualify." As of November 17, 2009, the government has paid claims of 21,810 people, denied 8,789, and paid $1,455,257,096 in reparations.

There was also a ban placed on uranium mining which details that companies have no right to mine or process uranium in Navajo Indian County. Dr. Tommy Rock, a member of the Navajo Nation from Monument Valley, Utah and a doctor of earth science and environmental sustainability states "Whether drilling on Navajo Trust land, fee simple land, or federal land, mining companies have no right to be drilling in Navajo Indian Country" (Rock, "Guest Column: Navajo Nation, Take Action Now to Stop New Uranium Mining").

== Abandoned Mine Land Program ==
The Navajo Nation Abandoned Mine Land(s) (NN AML) are numerous United States Environmental Protection Agency-designated "AML sites" on lands of the Navajo people which were used for mining (e.g., uranium). Sites include:

- Abandoned Uranium Mines on the Navajo Nation, Arizona (Site NNN000906087); a region with many of the "521 abandoned uranium mine areas".
- Skyline Abandoned Uranium Mine, Utah; in Monument Valley at Oljato Mesa (the waste piles area has a distinct site number)
- Skyline AUM Waste Piles (NN000908358)
- Northeast Church Rock Mine, New Mexico (NECR, NNN000906132); "mostly on Navajo tribal trust land", "the highest priority abandoned mine cleanup in [sic] the Navajo Nation", and a site which adjoins the United Nuclear Corporation (UNC) uranium mill Superfund site "on private fee land".

"During the late 1990s, portions...were closed by the Navajo Nation Abandoned Mine Land program".

EPA (Environmental Protection Agency) maintains a partnership with the Navajo Nation. Since 1994, the Superfund Program has provided technical assistance and funding to assess potentially contaminated sites and to develop a response. The EPA has entered into enforcement agreements and settlements valued at over $1.7 billion to reduce the highest risks of radiation exposure to the Navajo people from AUMs (Abandoned Uranium Mines). As a result, funds are available to begin the assessment and cleanup process at 219 of the 523 abandoned uranium mines as of May 2019.

The Abandoned Uranium Mine Settlement fact sheet provides information on the abandoned-uranium-mines enforcement agreements and settlements to address abandoned uranium mines on the Navajo Nation. To learn more about EPA's Superfund legal agreements please visit Negotiating Superfund Settlements. Uranium mining took place on the Navajo Nation from 1944 to 1986, and some local residents used materials from uranium mines when building their homes Mining materials that were used can potentially lead to exposure exceeding background (naturally occurring) levels. These materials include ore and waste rock used for foundations, walls, or fireplaces; mine tailings mixed into cement used for foundations, floors, and cinder block walls; and other contaminated building materials (wood, metal, etc.) that may have been salvaged from the abandoned mine areas.

The EPA and the Navajo Nation Environmental Protection Agency's (NNEPA) Contaminated Structures Program evaluates structures on Navajo Nation that may have been constructed using abandoned mine materials or built on or near abandoned mines. The Contaminated Structures Program is responsible for conducting evaluations of potentially contaminated structures, yards and material, as well as removal and cleanup of contaminated structures and materials if there is an exposure risk. The program is for Navajo residents living close to mines or who know their home was built with contaminated materials. Participation in the program is voluntary and at no cost to the resident. USEPA and NNEPA have completed over 1,100 assessments on Navajo Nation since the program began in 2007.

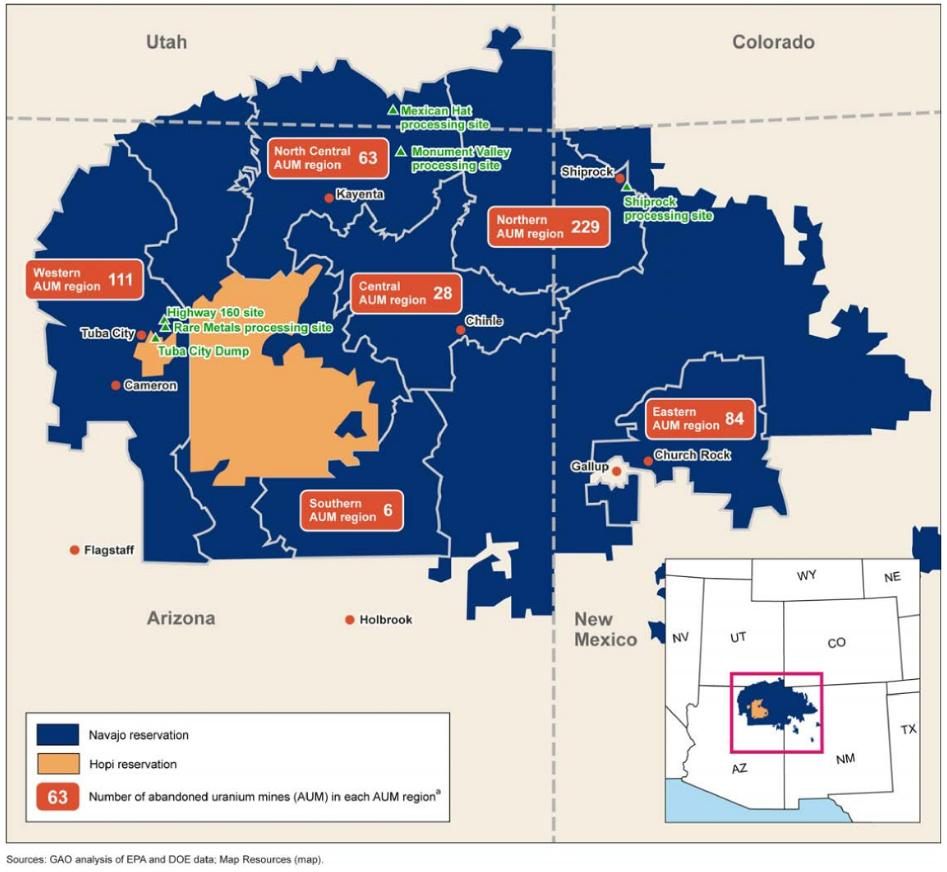
Areas affected by Abandoned Uranium Mines

=== History ===
This specific Superfund site for the AUMs on Navajo land has been in existence since 1994. This is following many years of research on the health effects of uranium mining which eventually led to the Radiation Exposure Compensation Act in 1990. Since its acceptance as a Superfund site, many federal, tribal, and grassroots organizations have come together to assess and remediate contamination sites on the Navajo Nation. Due to the fact that there are hundreds of contaminated sites, there have been a few big successes and many communities stuck in limbo. The following is a history of this Superfund site, the organizations that have collaborated on this environmental remediation, and recent criticisms of the handling of this large and complicated problem.

The Abandoned Uranium Mines on the Navajo Nation were established as a Superfund site in 1994 in response to a Congressional hearing brought by the Navajo Nation on November 4, 1993. This hearing included the Environmental Protection Agency (EPA), the Department of Energy (DOE), and the Bureau of Indian Affairs (BIA). Superfund status stems from the Comprehensive Environmental Response, Compensation, and Liability Act of 1980 (CERCLA) which allows the United States federal government to assign funds for environmental remediation of uncontrolled hazardous waste sites. The Navajo Nation is located in Region 9 (Pacific Southwest) of the Superfund which serves Arizona, California, Hawaii, Nevada, the Pacific Islands, and Tribal Nations. The site's official EPA # is NNN000906087 and it is located in Congressional District 4. According to the EPA's Superfund site overview, other names for the AUMs may include "Navajo Abandoned Uranium Mines" or "Northeast Church Rock Mine." Church Rock Mine is one of the EPA's most successful clean-up sites among over 500 sites spanning the 27,000 square mile Navajo Nation.

Nearly four years after the initial Congressional hearing, the EPA announced their first helicopter survey for the AUMs in September 1997. Located in the Oljato area in Southeastern Utah near the Utah-Arizona border, this was first of several helicopter surveys that aimed to measure "naturally occurring radiation (gamma radiation) coming from abandoned uranium mining areas." The stated purpose of these surveys was to "determine if these sites pose a risk to the people in the area and if so, what measures should be taken to minimize that risk."

Over ten years later, on June 9, 2008, the EPA announced its five-year plan for the clean-up of uranium contamination on the Navajo Nation. This five-year plan contained nine specific objectives for 2008–2012: assess up to 500 contaminated structures and remediate those that pose a health risk; assess up to 70 potentially contaminated water sources and assist those affected by it; assess and require cleanup of AUMs via a tiered ranking system of high priority mines; clean Church Rock Mine, the highest-priority mine; remediate groundwater of abandoned uranium milling sites; assess the Highway 160 site; assess and clean Tuba City Dump; assess and treat health conditions for populations near AUMs; and lastly to summarize the action of the Nuclear Regulatory Commission (NRC) in its assistance to the Navajo Nation's cleanup efforts. Since the introduction of the five-year plan, the EPA has released a progress report (available online) each consecutive year. As of August 2011, the EPA lists its accomplishments as: screening 683 structures, sampling 250 unregulated water sources and shutting down 3 such contaminated sources, provision of public outreach and educational programs for safe water practices, instituting a 2.6 million dollar water hauling feasibility project, and providing up to 386 homes with clean drinking water through a 20 million dollar project with Indian Health Services. For 2012, the EPA has listed its next steps as replacing 6 contaminated structures, demolishing other contaminated structures, and continuing screening of these structures for referral to the EPA's Response Program. The 2011 progress report also lists Church Rock, the Oljato Mesa, and the Mariano Lake Mine as sites of current or proposed remediation.

According to the EPA's website, the AUM Superfund site is not on the National Priorities List (NPL) and has no proposals to be put on this list. The NPL is the list of hazardous Superfund sites that are deemed eligible for long-term environmental remediation. The EPA suggests that although NPL listing is a possibility it is "not likely" for the abandoned uranium mines on the Navajo nation. NPL status guides the EPA in its decisions on sites to further investigate, a process that has been criticized for the handling of these mines. With over 500 uranium sites and only a few sites slated for full-scale remediation plans, the prioritization process has recently been called into question by The New York Times (see Recent Press).

=== Partnership agencies ===
Superfund works with many agencies from both the federal government and the Navajo Nation in order to properly assess and direct funding to mining sites. These agencies include: the Navajo Nation Environmental Protection Agency (NNEPA), the Indian Health Services (IHS), the Diné Network for Environmental Health (DiNEH), the Navajo Nation Department of Water Resources (NNDWR), the Department of Energy (DOE), and US Nuclear Regulatory Commission (NRC). The NNEPA was established in 1972 and officially recognized through legislation as a separate regulatory branch of the Navajo Nation in 1995. With the official acceptance of the NNEPA also came the adoption of the Navajo Nation Environmental Policy Act. According to the NNEPA website, their mission is: "With respect to Diné values, to protect human health, land, air and water by developing, implementing and enforcing environmental laws and regulations with a commitment to public participation, sustainability, partnership, and restoration." (Diné is the word for Navajo in the traditional Navajo language) NNEPA consults with the US EPA on site assessments (the US EPA is the lead agency for the Site Assessment Project). NNEPA helps the EPA in assessing and deciding which contaminated structures should be demolished and which water sources should be deemed a human health risk. The two also collaborate to perform community outreach for the Navajo people whose lives are affected by the uranium mining. The Centers for Disease Control and the DiNEH Project are also integral players in the assessment of water quality and community outreach. The Navajo Nation Department of Water Resources, with funding from the EPA, assist Navajo residents by hauling water for residents near 4 contaminated water sources, a 2.6 million dollar project. Indian Health Services helped fund the 20 million dollar drinking water project started in 2011. This project serves 386 homes near 10 contaminated water sources. The NNEPA, IHS, NNDWR, and DiNEH project have been the main partners with the US EPA in water hauling projects.

=== Criticism and press ===
Despite the EPA's claims of a "strong partnership with the Navajo Nation," recent articles have been published that call into question the equitability and efficiency of the EPA's action on the abandoned uranium mines. On March 31, 2012, The New York Times published an article entitled "Uranium Mines Dot Navajo Land, Neglected and Still Perilous" by Leslie MacMillan. The article suggests that politics and money are influencing the prioritization of mine clean-up efforts. David Shafer, an environmental manager at the United States Department of Energy, has said that questions of whether current uranium problems are due to past mining or to the naturally occurring mineral are delaying the process of cleaning up. Similar concerns are common in environmental remediation projects for victims of industrial pollution.

While the EPA does prioritize mines that are nearest to people's homes, MacMillan highlights some remote locations where people do live and yet have been neglected by the EPA. Cameron, Arizona is one such site which has a population of nearly 1000. Rancher Larry Gordy stumbled across an abandoned uranium mine on his grazing land for his cattle near Cameron in the summer of 2010. There are still no warning signs in the town of Cameron to alert people of potential contamination. On December 30, 2010 Scientific American published an article entitled "Abandoned Uranium Mines: An 'Overwhelming Problem' in the Navajo Nation" by Francie Diep. Diep told Gordy's story and reported that the EPA assessed his site on November 9, 2010. Diep suggested that this date was moved up due to publicity of Gordy's story; originally the EPA had promised to visit within six months of his original discovery of the uranium mine.

Similar allegations of prioritization due to negative publicity for the EPA were made of the Skyline Mine in the Oljato Mesa. Elsie Begay, a 71-year-old Navajo woman from the Oljato region was the topic of a series of articles in The Los Angeles Times in 2006. These articles were written by Yellow Dirt: An American Story of a Poisoned Land and a People Betrayed (2010) author Judy Pasternak, whose work on these articles led to her book. One EPA representative, Jason Musante, stated this publicity "might have bumped the site up the priority list."

Over a year after Gordy stumbled across the mine in his cattle's grazing land, MacMillan reports that the site at Cameron has yet to be given a priority by the EPA. When EPA officials were asked to accompany a reporter to the Cameron site, the officials declined and instead offered to visit the newly cleaned site in Oljato. MacMillan spoke with a Navajo hotel manager near the Skyline Mine who expressed hesitation about the EPAs remediation, stating, "That's what they want you to see: something that's all nice and cleaned up." MacMillan drew attention to the fact that cows are grazing on contaminated land and people are eating these cattle. Taylor McKinnon, a director at the Center for Biological Diversity, went so far as to say the site was the "worst he had seen in the Southwest." Although the locally grown beef is tested, standard tests for meat do not include checking for radioactive substances like uranium. The EPA has put an emphasis on health effects throughout its five-year plan, so the lack of any sort of attention in this matter has raised eyebrows.

In addition to the questioning of political bias in the prioritization of mining sites, there is criticism of the EPA's decision to revisit a 1989 permit proposing to mine for uranium near Church Rock. New Mexico's KUNM radio station reported on May 9, 2012 that Uranium Resources Incorporated has expressed interest in starting production near Church Rock by the end of 2013. An online petition has already gained nearly 10,000 signatures against this new mining initiative.

== Navajo treatment, impact and response ==
Beginning in the 1960s, uranium miners were beginning to become ill with cancer at increasing rates. The state of Utah did not recognize radiation exposure at the time as a category of illness, making workers compensation unattainable for many of the sick Navajo (Dawson and Madsen 2007). Private industry's treatment of the Navajo workers was poor, according to recent standards: companies failed to educate workers on precautionary measures, did not install sufficient engineering controls, such as adequate ventilation; and did not provide sufficient safety equipment to protect workers to the known dangers related to the mines. The Navajo were never told of the radiation effects, and did not have a word for it in their language. Many Navajo did not speak English and trusted the uranium companies to have their interests in mind. Navajo workers and residents have felt betrayed as the results of the studies became known, as well as the long delays by companies and the US government to try to prevent the damage, and to pay compensation. Lung cancer became so prevalent among the Navajo people that working in uranium mines was banned on Navajo lands in 2005.

Following the Gold King Mine Spill in 2015, farmers lost 75% of their crops due to the lack of clean water. The EPA provided the Navajo with water, but it was contaminated with oil, poisoning the land and killing the livestock. Duane Yazzie, a Navajo Tribe member, spoke about the spiritual and cultural importance that agriculture plays in the Navajo culture and how both the oil and uranium contamination infringed upon their ability to practice their culture. In the case of environmental hazards such as the Gold King mine spill, the EPA offers The Standard Form 95 where claims of economic damages, unemployment, loss of income, or damage to property can be filed as a result of an environmental incident. The Standard Form 95 is also a form of environmental racism according to Jade Begay, director of policy and advocacy for the Indigenous-led organization NDN Collective. They explain that "The President of the Navajo Nation, Russell Begaye, has announced that he intends to take legal action against the EPA, which has taken full responsibility for this spill. Mr. Begaye has also warned Diné people NOT to use or sign Form 95 for Damage, Injury or Death as a result of Gold King Mine Release" (Begay, "Tó Éí Ííńá (Water Is Life): The Impact of the Gold Mine Spill on the Navajo Nation"). Ethel Branch, the Navajo Nation attorney general also said this form contained backhanded, offensive language that would diminish one's ability to get full financial compensation and restrict their ability to file additional, future claims.

=== Implicit racism ===
White workers also faced different conditions: Navajo workers were forced to enter the mine directly after a detonation, while it was filled with dust and smoke. However, the white workers were able to stay behind. Navajo miners were paid less than miners from off-reservation, well below minimum wage. Until radon exposure safety standards were imposed by the Secretary of Labor Willard Wirtz over the objections of the Atomic Energy Commission and the uranium mining industry in June, 1967, mines lacked ventilation, exposing workers to radon.

Widows of mine workers met to discuss their grief; they started a grassroots movement that eventually reached the Congressional floor.

The Church Rock uranium mill spill raised claims that race was a factor in the federal government's paying little attention to the disaster:

When there was a relatively minor problem at Three Mile Island in Pennsylvania, the entire attention of the Nation was focused on this location and the Federal and State assistance brought to bear to deal with it was extraordinary. When the largest release of radioactive material in the history of the United States occurs in Navajo country, however, the attention paid to it by the Federal and State authorities is minimal at best.

— Peter MacDonald, Chairman of the Navajo Nation

Not only are the Navajo impacted by implicit racism, but so are all Indigenous People. Crystal Echo Hawk, a dual citizen of the U.S. and the Pawnee Nation of Oklahoma and Indigenous leader states that "Being inclusive of Native Americans in philanthropy does more than address injustice; it also recognizes that Native Americans and tribes are an equally important part of American society as other groups and can be partners to achieve social change across a range of communities and sectors" (Hawk, "Implicit Bias and Native Americans: Philanthropy's Hidden Minority").

=== Community involvement and response ===
Forgotten People (FP) is a grassroots organization incorporated on the Navajo Nation which represents the health and well-being of the residents of the Navajo Nation in Arizona. The full name of this organization is Forgotten People Diné Bé Iina' na' hil naa, meaning Diné Rebuilding Communities. Forgotten People began as a political organization dedicated to advocacy for the Navajo people against forced relocation plans which spanned 1974 to 2007. When forced relocation programs were ended in 2007, the organization shifted focus to a broader variety of issues with a focus in environmental remediation. In 2009, Forgotten People received the Environmental Excellence Award from the NNEPA. Forgotten People was an integral aspect of the Black Falls water project, which involved collaboration with the US EPA to provide clean drinking water and educational outreach for the Black Falls community which was affected by uranium mining. FP attributes the success of Black Falls with the evolution "from a needs-based or dependency approach to the agencies into an assumption of full responsibility for their own development." The Black Falls community was able to decide upon their own solutions for their water problems. Their efforts were coordinated by FP and funded by the US EPA. Forgotten People represents an evolving grassroots community which is moving simply from organizing to actually empowering residents to take their development into their own hands.

Forgotten People also gathers and displays pertinent public records for a variety of issues facing the Navajo on their website. For their campaigns against uranium mining, their website displays all official responses US attempts at relaxing uranium restrictions on Navajo territory. FP also preserves the response of the President of the Navajo Nation in response to proposals for uranium mining near the Grand Canyon. In 2005, the President of the Navajo Nation, Joe Shirley, Jr., signed the Diné Natural Resources Protection Act which banned uranium mining and processing on Navajo land. After signing the law, President Shirley stated, "As long as there are no answers to cancer, we shouldn't have uranium mining on the Navajo Nation. I believe the powers that be committed genocide on Navajo land by allowing uranium mining."

Diné Citizens Against Ruining our Environment (Diné CARE), established in 1988 as a grassroots organization, aims to give citizens of the Navajo Nation a voice to protect their environment, culture, and community. The expansion of the organization, over the years, allows for individuals within the Navajo community to share their experiences and build a network of people dedicated to the preservation of the Navajo land and resources. Membership is free and involves being an active advocate for the community that the member lives in. Projects and campaigns that Dine' CARE works on are financed by grant money. One of the project that Dine' CARE works on is the Navajo Radiation Victims Project. This project helps regions impacted by nuclear waste from uranium mining by visiting communities and gaining first hand accounts from victims. Earl Tulley, who is now Vice President of Dine' Care, believes the project helps all victims of uranium radiation exposure, native or non-native, get the compensation and help that they need. The organization fights to clean up impacted areas and prevent any future mining on Navajo land. The most notable success for the project was the amendment of the Radiation Exposure Compensation Act (RECA) in 2000. Dine' CARE helped create the Western States RECA Reform Coalition to expand the scope of compensation for victims not only by extending the geographic regions and time periods covered, but also by adding two new occupational claimants and compensable diseases.

=== Enduring impact ===
Many residents of the Navajo Nation have anxiety and concerns about the future because of large amounts of radioactive waste remaining. One Navajo Elder explains: "We, the elderlies, that resides around here don't know what was good and worst about the uranium. There were several deaths in this area that was affected by radiation or cancers. We need help. I lost my wife last year [to cancer] and now I am 87 years. My wife would have been 70 years old which made a lot of difference. I am lonely and can't get anywhere without her help. I was hurted and miserable." The number of cancer cases has continued to rise because of these conditions, as water, air and ground generally have been affected. In areas near uranium mills, residents suffer stomach cancer at rates 15 times those of the national level. In some areas, the frequency gets as high as 200 times the national average. Hundreds of abandoned uranium mines with exposed tailings remain unremediated on the Navajo Nation area posing a contamination hazard. Near the former uranium mills, water contamination and contamination of rocks which many residents used to build their houses, continue to be problems.

A 1995 report published by American Public Health Association found: "excess mortality rates for lung cancer, pneumoconioses and other respiratory diseases, and tuberculosis for Navajo uranium miners. Increasing duration of exposure to underground uranium mining was associated with increased mortality risk for all three diseases… The most important long-term mortality risks for the Navajo uranium miners continue to be lung cancer and pneumoconioses and other nonmalignant respiratory diseases." That is to say, not stomach cancer, which the Navajo people naturally have a higher rate of experiencing than the national US average. The descendants of mining families continue to have extremely high rates of ovarian and testicular cancer.

The enduring effect of uranium mining continues to contaminate the soil and endanger survival of wild plants. Additionally, livestock's dependency on clean food and water sources that are being slowly lost, and that may not recover, casts uncertainty on the continuity of the Navajo's pastoral lifestyle.

Scientific consensus has not been reached about the gravity of the public health threat caused by uranium contamination of groundwater on the Navajo Nation. However, uranium is present in a substantial portion of unregulated groundwater sources used for human consumption. The lack of consensus on the risk that this poses to the Navajo may indicate a research deficit that is also seen in other Native American communities. However, a significant connection between proximity to an abandoned uranium mine and presence of uranium (and arsenic) in groundwater wells has been made, no matter if the elements occur naturally or are a result of the mining process. Studies have shown an autoimmune response in some Navajos from uranium mine waste that may indicate a risk for people with autoimmune diseases, which are more prevalent in Native Americans. Chronic lack of access to regulated water sources means that many Navajo people may be drinking from uranium and arsenic-contaminated water.

== Clean-up efforts ==
Since 1994, the Environmental Protection Agency (EPA), along with the Navajo Nation Environmental Protection Agency, has been mapping areas affected with radioactivity. In 2007, they compiled an atlas of the abandoned uranium mills in order to rid the area of nuclear waste. In 2008, the EPA implemented a five-year cleanup plan, focusing on the most pressing issues: contaminated water and structures. The EPA estimates that 30% of all Navajo people lack access to uncontaminated drinking water.

The EPA is targeting 500 abandoned uranium mills as another part of their five-year cleanup plan, with the goal of ridding the area of nuclear waste. Its priority was identification of contaminated water sources and structures; many of the latter have been destroyed and removed. In 2011, it completed a multi-year project of removing 20,000 cubic yards of contaminated earth out of the reservation, near the Skyline Mine, to controlled storage on the plateau.

In 2017, a $600 million settlement attempts to clean up 94 abandoned uranium mines.

The EPA and NNEPA prioritized 46 mines (called priority mines) based on gamma radiation levels, proximity to homes and potential for water contamination identified in preliminary assessments documented in the EPA Site Screen Reports. Detailed cleanup investigations will be conducted at these mines by the end of 2019. All documents can be found here.

All 46 priority mines are in the assessment phase which includes biological and cultural surveys, radiation scanning, and soil and water sampling. These assessments help to determine the extent of contamination. The assessment work at the 46 priority mines will be documented in Removal Site Evaluation reports which will be completed by the end of 2019. These reports will be shared with communities and made available on this website.

The federal government seeks proposals from businesses to clean up abandoned uranium mines on the Navajo Nation. $220 million available to small businesses to clean up Navajo uranium mines. The funding comes from a $1.7 billion settlement with Tronox, the successor of Kerr-McGee, a company that mined the region. During the Cold War companies extracted nearly 30 million tons of uranium from Navajo land. The EPA says it has funding to assess and clean up 220 of the 520 abandoned mines. The Request for Proposal can be found at www.fedconnect.net in the "Public Opportunities" section by searching Reference Number 68HE0918R0014. Contract proposals will be accepted through May 28, 2019.

Residents of the Red Water Pond Road area have requested relocation to a new, off-grid village to be located on Standing Black Tree Mesa while cleanup progresses on the Northeast Church Rock Mine Superfund site, as an alternative to the EPA-proposed relocation of residents to Gallup.

While many mines currently remain closed, the future of renewable energy may lead to their reopening. One mine in particular which was reopened was the Pinyon Plain Mine which sits near the Baii Nwaavio Ancestral Footprints of the Grand Canyon National Monument, where the Havasupai people come from. This mine was reopened in 2022 in according, "when the mine leaks or introduces radionuclides into land and water through normal mining processes, as other nearby mines like the Pinenut Mine and Orphan mine have done, it will contaminate the Havasupai's water source, the Redwall-Muac aquifer, which the Havasupai have a responsibility to protect" (Keeler, Nuclear Injustice: Why a Nuclear Renaissance is the Same Old Colonial Story"). The opening of uranium mines has significant effects on Indigenous communities and their ways of life. The Inflation Reduction Act also focuses $30 billion into nuclear power, which further includes the opening of new mines and the reopening of old ones, many of which are located on Native land.

== In popular culture ==
In the 2020s, reggae rock band Tha 'Yoties (led by Hopi/Tewa edutainer Ed Kabotie) performed and released music about uranium mining on Navajo lands during their national tours.

== See also ==
- Native American reservation politics
- In-situ leaching
- World Uranium Hearing
- Church Rock uranium mill spill
- Struggle for the Land
- Nuclear labor issues
- Environmental racism
- Environmental racism in Europe
- Thunderheart
- Wastelanding 2015 book
