= Calfin Lafkenche =

Calfín Lafkenche is a Mapuche leader and an environmental and indigenous rights activist. He is the lead coordinator of Minga Indígena, a network of Indigenous leaders from across the Americas.

== Activism ==
In 2016, Lafkenche spoke out against the United Nations' REDD+ framework as a solution to climate change. The Indigenous Environmental Network, of which Lafkenche was a part, recommended that the United Nations, among other things, cancel all REDD+ projects in or near Indigenous Peoples' lands.

In 2021, Lafkenche attended COP26 with other indigenous leaders with Minga Indígena. During his attendance at the conference, Lafkenche spoke on behalf of Minga Indigena, demanding that a paragraph be included that acknowledges Indigenous people and their land. He also called for the UNFCC to recognize the Minga as an official representative of Indigenous Peoples.

He serves as the Latin America coordinator of Alianza MILPA and is part of Desarrollo Intercultural Chile.
