= Wasted Love (disambiguation) =

"Wasted Love" is a 2025 song by JJ, and the winner of the 2025 Eurovision Song Contest.

Wasted Love may also refer to:

- "Wasted Love" (Matt McAndrew song), 2014
- "Wasted Love" (Ofenbach song) featuring Lagique, 2021
- "Wasted Love" (Steve Angello song), 2014
- Wasted Love, also known as Song, 1928 British-German silent drama film
- "Wasted Love", a song by City and Colour from the 2015 album If I Should Go Before You

== See also ==
- "Wasting Love", a 1992 single by Iron Maiden
- Wasted (disambiguation)
- "Waste Love", a track from the 2019 Machine Gun Kelly album Hotel Diablo
