= Lori Goodman =

American environmentalist

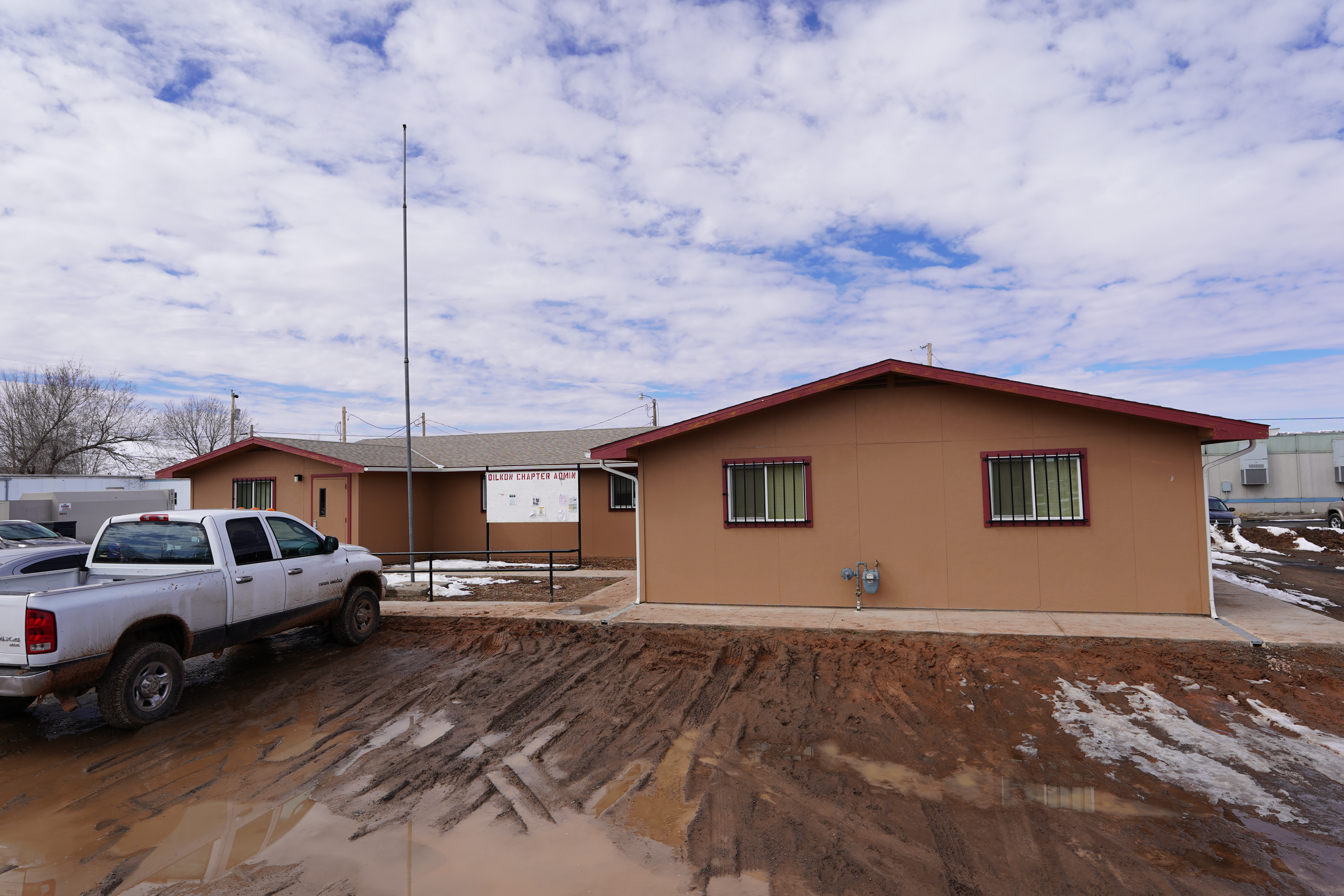
Chapter House for Dilkon Chapter in Arizona

Lori Goodman is a Native American environmentalist from Dilkon, Arizona. Goodman was one the founding members of Diné CARE (Diné Citizens Against Ruining Our Environment) that was founded in 1989 and is currently retired as an executive director.

== Environmental Activism ==
Lori Goodman first started her career on the Navajo Nation in efforts against the a proposal from Waste-Tech Services, that called for a $40 million recycling plant on the Navajo reservation near the Dilkon community. It promised the community "$200,000 a year, with an additional $600,000 a year to be paid...in rent and lease funds." However, it was later found out that the "recycling plant" was instead planned to be a toxic waste incinerator. In 1989, Goodman was a stay-at-home mom when she received a phone call form her sister learning of the proposal. Later her family friends became involved, including her brother Al. CARE was what Diné CARE was first called before becoming officially Diné CARE. It was also during this time that the spark for the future Indigenous Environmental Network would later come to be, from the kitchen of Lori Goodman's home.

After the victory of Dilkon community against Waste-Tech's proposal, Goodman became a leader in Diné CARE. She acted as an administrator, spokeswoman, treasurer, secretary, and executive director. She taught her family and community how to rid of toxic substances from their households. She also educated Navajo people about proposals, gathered statements, contacted government agencies, acted as a liaison with the tribal government, and using her own funds to support Diné CARE. She used her own home as an office for Diné CARE.

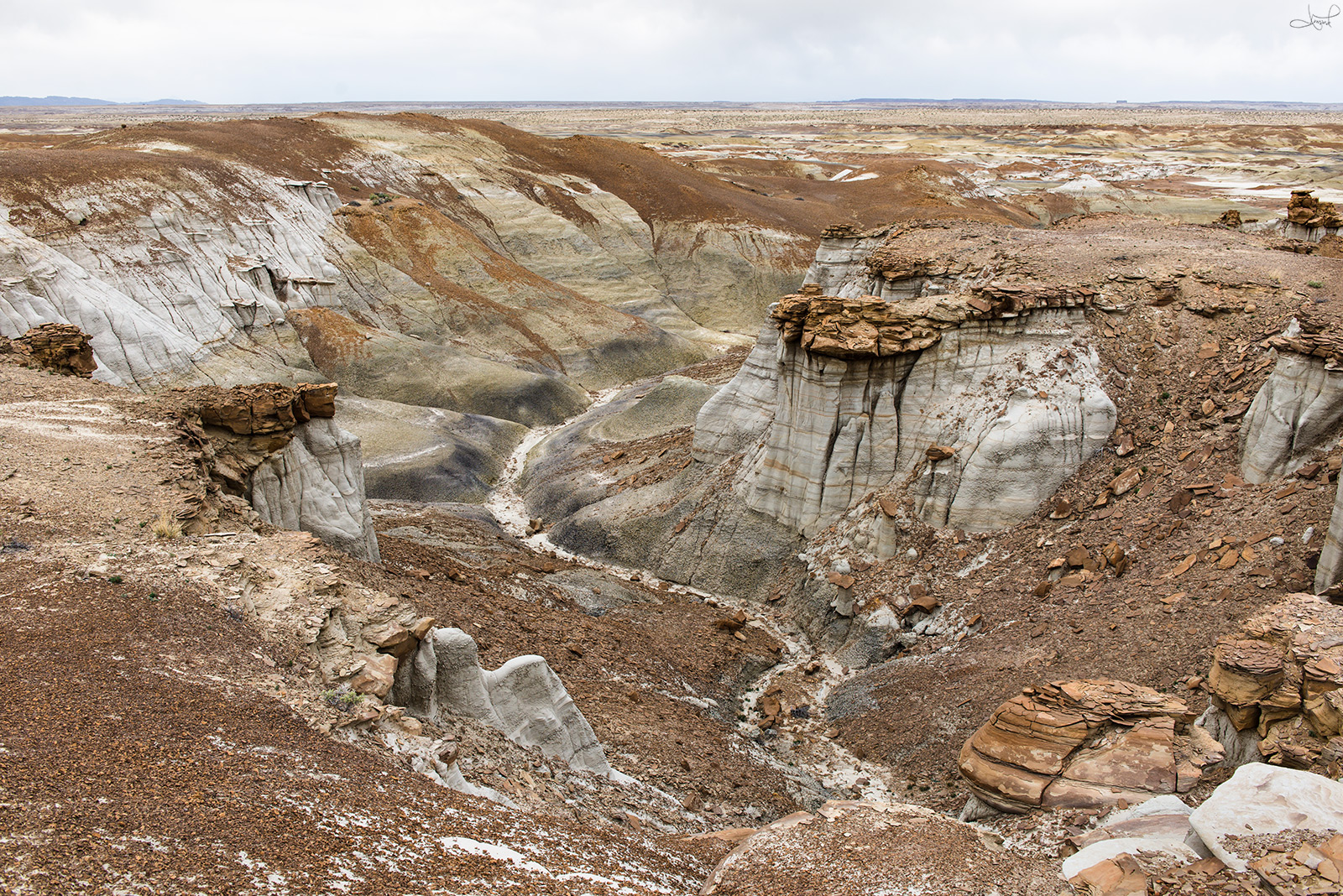
Where Desert Rock would have been located in Burnham Badlands, New Mexico

Between 2003 and 2011, Goodman and Diné CARE took part in actions against the proposal and building of the Desert Rock Power Plant. Goodman acted as a spokeswoman and participated in protests against the proposal. In 2009, the U.S. Environmental Protection Agency revoked the Final Air Quality Permit for the Desert Rock Power Plant from .

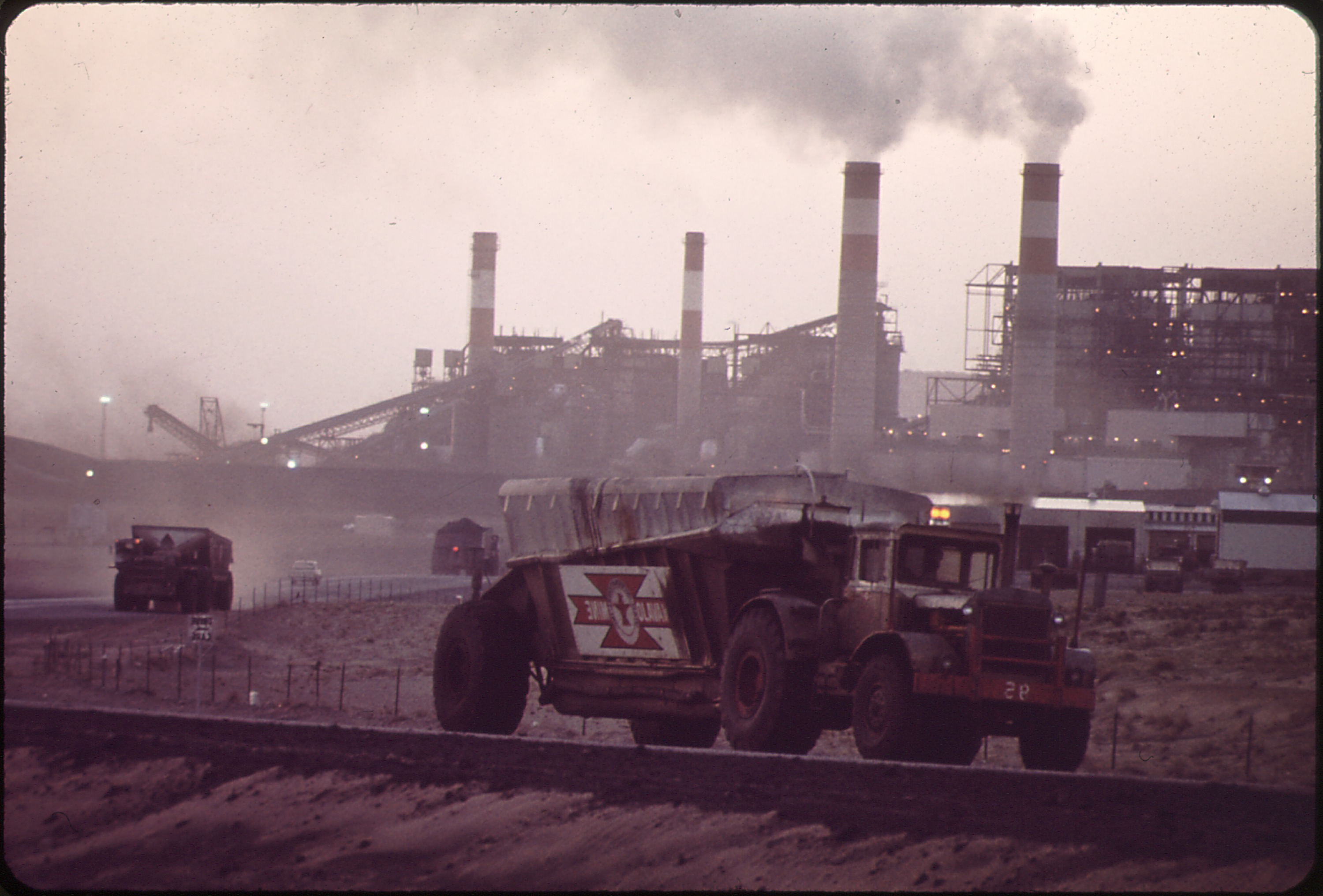
Coal Haul from Navajo Mine to Four Corners Power Plant

During 2013, on the Navajo Nation the decision by the Navajo Transitional Energy Company to purchase Navajo Mine for continuation of coal mining till 2031. Lori Goodman spoke out against the mining; she was concerned about the environmental impacts the mine site and neighboring Four Corners Power Plant could have. However, despite Goodman and Dine CARE's efforts, the Navajo Mine was promoted for operation.
