= Wasted =

Wasted may refer to:

== Arts, entertainment, and media ==
=== Literature ===
- Wasted: Tales of a GenX Drunk, a 1997 memoir by Mark Judge
- Wasted: A Memoir of Anorexia and Bulimia, a 1998 autobiography by Marya Hornbacher
- Wasted: A Childhood Stolen, An Innocence Betrayed, A Life Redeemed, a 2008 memoir by Mark Johnson
- Wasted (play), a 2012 play by Kae Tempest

=== Music ===
==== EPs ====
- Wasted (EP), by L.A. Guns

==== Songs ====
- "Wasted" (Carrie Underwood song)
- "Wasted" (Def Leppard song)
- "Wasted" (Gucci Mane song)
- "Wasted" (Jennifer Paige song)
- "Wasted" (Juice Wrld song)
- "Wasted" (Margaret song)
- "Wasted" (Peking Duk song)
- "Wasted" (Tiësto song)
- "Wasted", by Abhi the Nomad from Abhi vs the Universe
- "Wasted", by Ally Ryan
- "Wasted", by And One
- "Wasted", by Angus & Julia Stone from A Book Like This
- "Wasted", by Anis Don Demina
- "Wasted", by Black Flag from Nervous Breakdown
- "Wasted", by Blancmange from Happy Families
- "Wasted", by Cartel from Cartel
- "Wasted", by Circle Jerks from Group Sex
- "Wasted", by Demi Lovato from Holy Fvck
- "Wasted", by Digga D
- "Wasted", by Don Toliver from Heaven or Hell
- "Wasted", by E-40 from The Block Brochure: Welcome to the Soil 3
- "Wasted", by Earshot from The Silver Lining
- "Wasted", by Goldfinger from Disconnection Notice
- "Wasted", by Kasabian from For Crying Out Loud
- "Wasted", by Lil Wayne from No Ceilings
- "Wasted", by LP
- "Wasted", by Mazzy Star from So Tonight That I Might See
- ”Wasted”, by MKTO from their self titled album MKTO
- "Wasted", by the Outfield from Any Time Now
- "Wasted", by The Runaways from Waitin' for the Night
- "Wasted", by Stabbing Westward from Stabbing Westward
- "Wasted", by Suicide Silence from No Time to Bleed
- "Wasted", by Travis Scott from Rodeo

=== Television ===
- Wa$ted! (New Zealand TV series), a 2007 New Zealand reality television series
- Wa$ted! (U.S. TV series), a 2008 American reality television series
- Wasted (UK TV series), a 2016 British comedy television series

=== Other arts, entertainment, and media ===
- Wasted (comics), a comic book by Gerry Alanguilan
- Wasted!, a 1996 Dutch film
- "Wasted", one of several possible game over scenarios in the Grand Theft Auto video game series

== Medicine ==
- a word for weighing much less than normal for one's height due to malnutrition

== Slang ==
- A slang word qualifying a person in various states of substance intoxication

== See also ==
- Waste (disambiguation)
- Wasting, a disease of losing fat and tissue
- Wasted Time (disambiguation)
- Monique Wadsted (born 1959), Swedish lawyer
