= Earl Tulley =

Navajo politician, environmental activist

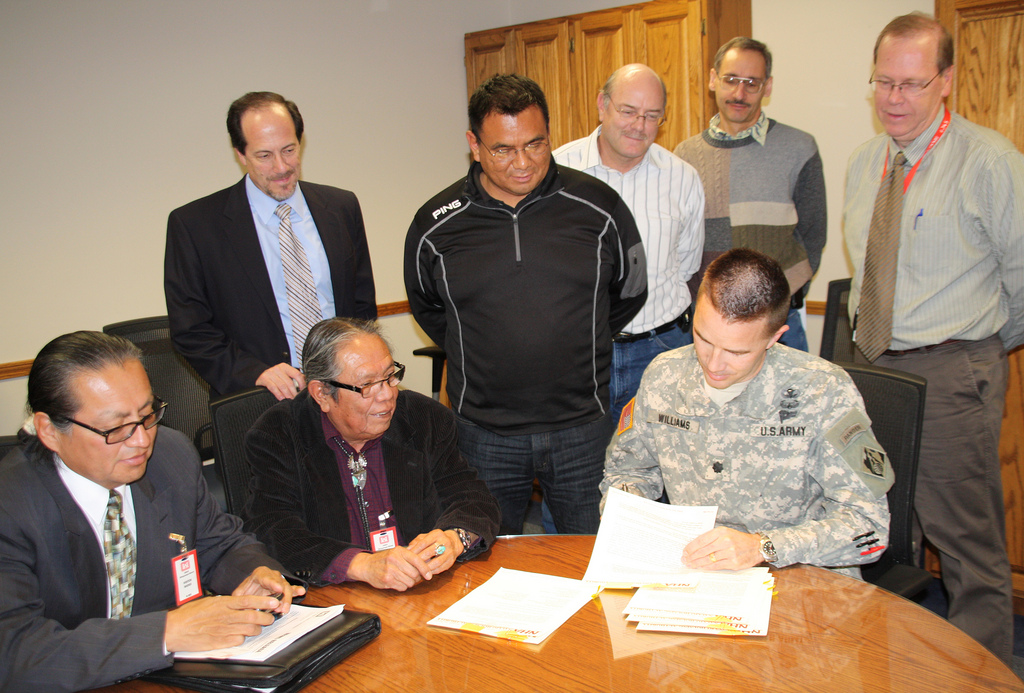
Earl Tulley - First from left

Earl Tulley is a Navajo environmental activist who advocates for environmental justice and the well-being of the Navajo people from the Ta’neeszahnii band. Raised in Blue Gap, Arizona/Táchii, he has spent his career focusing on issues affecting the Navajo Nation, including environmental sustainability, housing, and public health.

== Education ==
Tulley’s education began in the dormitory school system, a common experience for Navajo children at the time. His curiosity about the environment and health issues in his community deepened, particularly as mining companies began operations and later attempted remediation near areas like Blue Gap. Observing the impacts of uranium mining and radiation on his people, Tulley sought answers as to why so many in his community were suffering from illnesses, especially cancer. Driven by a desire to understand the molecular and chemical effects of radiation, he began studying independently, delving into the science of radiation, molecules, and formulas. His quest for answers led him to connect with others in Diné CARE, a grassroots environmental organization. Through this work Tulley has advocated for greater awareness and solutions to address the health crises affecting the Navajo Nation.

== Projects ==
The Navajo community faces challenges rooted in both traditional beliefs and the exploitation their lands and health by the US government. Historical sites like the Chuska Mountains, where elders would pray, highlight the cultural connection to the land. Praying includes placing corn pollen on the tip of the tongue. Nearby uranium mining, with nuclear testing in Nevada has led to degradation of the land and to cancer cases due to exposure to contamination. Mines near Blue Gap where Earl was from have also led to cross-contamination of water and soil in places like Tuba City. The depletion of the Colorado River further threatens resources for the tribes it connects like the Navajo, Hopi, Pueblo, and Southern Paiute.

To combat this Tulley helped found Diné CARE, an environmental organization that works to preserve Navajo lands from overexploitation. One example of overexploitation is the commercial timber cutting in the Chuska Mountains and Defiance Plateau. Tulley's activism balances environmental concerns with economic realities, especially in places where resource extraction has provided jobs but also threatens the sustainability of the land.

In addition to his environmental work, Tulley is involved with public health initiatives. He helped with the creation of the Na Nihzhoozhi Center, a detoxification facility that helps Navajo people struggling with alcoholism. His work advocates against gaming on the Navajo Nation, instead recommending community-based economic solutions like micro-enterprises.

He also serves on the Chinle Agency Commission for the Navajo Nation Water Rights Commission. This group represents fifteen Navajo Nation chapters, including Black Mesa (Kits’iili), Blue Gap-Tachee, Chinle, Forest Lake, Hardrock, Lukachukai, Many Farms, Nazlini, Pinon, Rough Rock/Tse Ch' Izhi, Round Rock, Tsaile-Wheatfields, Tselani-Cottonwood, and Whippoorwill.

In 2021 Tulley was diagnosed with an aggressive form of non-Hodgkin lymphoma. He is in remission, but his treatment required him to cut off his braid. He continues to advocate for environmental justice in and around Táchii, his family's current and ancestral lands.
