= Indigenous Environmental Network =

Network of Indigenous, grassroots environmental justice activists

- Formation: 1990
- Headquarters: Bemidji, Minnesota, U.S.
- Exec. Dir.: Tom B.K. Goldtooth
- Website: ienearth.org

The Indigenous Environmental Network (IEN) is a coalition of indigenous, grassroots environmental justice activists, primarily based in the United States. Group members have represented Native American concerns at international events such as the United Nations Climate Change conferences in Copenhagen (2009) and Paris (2016). IEN organizes an annual conference to discuss proposed goals and projects for the coming year; each year the conference is held in a different indigenous nation. The network emphasizes environmental protection as a form of spiritual activism. IEN received attention in the news as a major organizer of the fight against the Keystone Pipeline and the Dakota Access Pipeline in the Dakota Access Pipeline protests.

== History ==
The Indigenous Environmental Network was created in 1990, to bring to light environmental and economic injustices faced specifically by the indigenous peoples of North America. Its formation took place at the annual Protecting Mother Earth gatherings that began in 1990 on the Navajo Nation in Dilkon, where the group of activists that would become Diné CARE had recently defeated a hazardous waste incinerator proposal. The IEN also first started from meetings in the home of Lori Goodman in the Navajo Nation, where she would host them in her own kitchen.

=== Ties to environmental justice movement ===
The environmental justice movement seeks to address issues of environmental racism, which arises when people of color and other marginalized populations such as indigenous peoples are disproportionately affected by exposure to hazardous environmental conditions; the unavailability of safe, healthy, and affordable food options; and exclusion from participatory involvement in community decision-making.

The environmental justice movement objects to over-exploitation of resources by governments and other actors. This includes dumping, establishment of toxic waste sites, or development of environmentally harmful infrastructure (such as pipelines), specifically on Native American reservations and First Nations reserves. Indigenous residents and custodians usually see development projects imposed in this manner as an infringement on their right to self-determination and religious freedom.

=== Past ===
The Indigenous Environmental Network has focused its activism on improving indigenous communities through grassroots efforts; prioritizing projects that protect the land, air, water, sacred sites, and natural resources. To accomplish the preservation of these assets, the network has organized campaigns, public awareness, and community building activities. The IEN meets locally, regionally, and nationally to promote awareness about issues of social justice, but primarily holds focus in North America.

The increase in toxic waste and nuclear waste storage facilities near indigenous lands was a main concern to the IEN during its beginnings in the early 1990s. After the initial focus on environmental hazards presented by these facilities, the network spread awareness across youth and tribal populations that paved the way for it to progress to campaigns and public activism. Every year, a conference is held entitled "Protecting Mother Earth Gatherings", which is aimed at educating the public as well as developing strategies for protecting the lands of indigenous peoples.

In 1995, IEN began hiring staff to represent the ideologies and goals of the organization. IEN workers strive for the preservation of indigenous peoples through tribal grassroots communities and tribal-government environmental staff. IEN has since evolved into a group that works to create change and strengthen tribal communities by protecting and preserving sacred sites.

=== Current activism ===
One of the popular cases of activism that IEN has participated in were the protests against the North Dakota Pipeline project, which is set to run through North Dakota, South Dakota, Iowa and to end in Illinois. The IEN has been a leading participant in coordinating international action such as bank divestments and days of emergency action that protest fascism and the use of fossil fuels that disrupt the livelihood of indigenous peoples.

Indigenous Rising Media is an IEN Project that works to defend the rights of indigenous peoples. It focuses on protecting the sanctity and integrity of Mother Earth and the movement towards a more just and sustainable future. The project has placed information about the North Dakota Pipeline on its website aimed at combating the dangers that directly affect indigenous people.

The group also recently participated in the Peoples Climate March on Washington, D.C., on April 29, 2017. The March was hosted to bring to light the dangers of climate change, and IEN supported the event. The rally was hosted by Dallas Goldtooth, a prominent activist protesting against the North Dakota Pipeline, along with Carrie Fulton, an African-American environmental-justice organizer. The Peoples Climate March took place on the 100th day of Donald Trump's presidency, and served as a protest to policy changes being made regarding environmental protection and conservation.

== Goals and beliefs ==
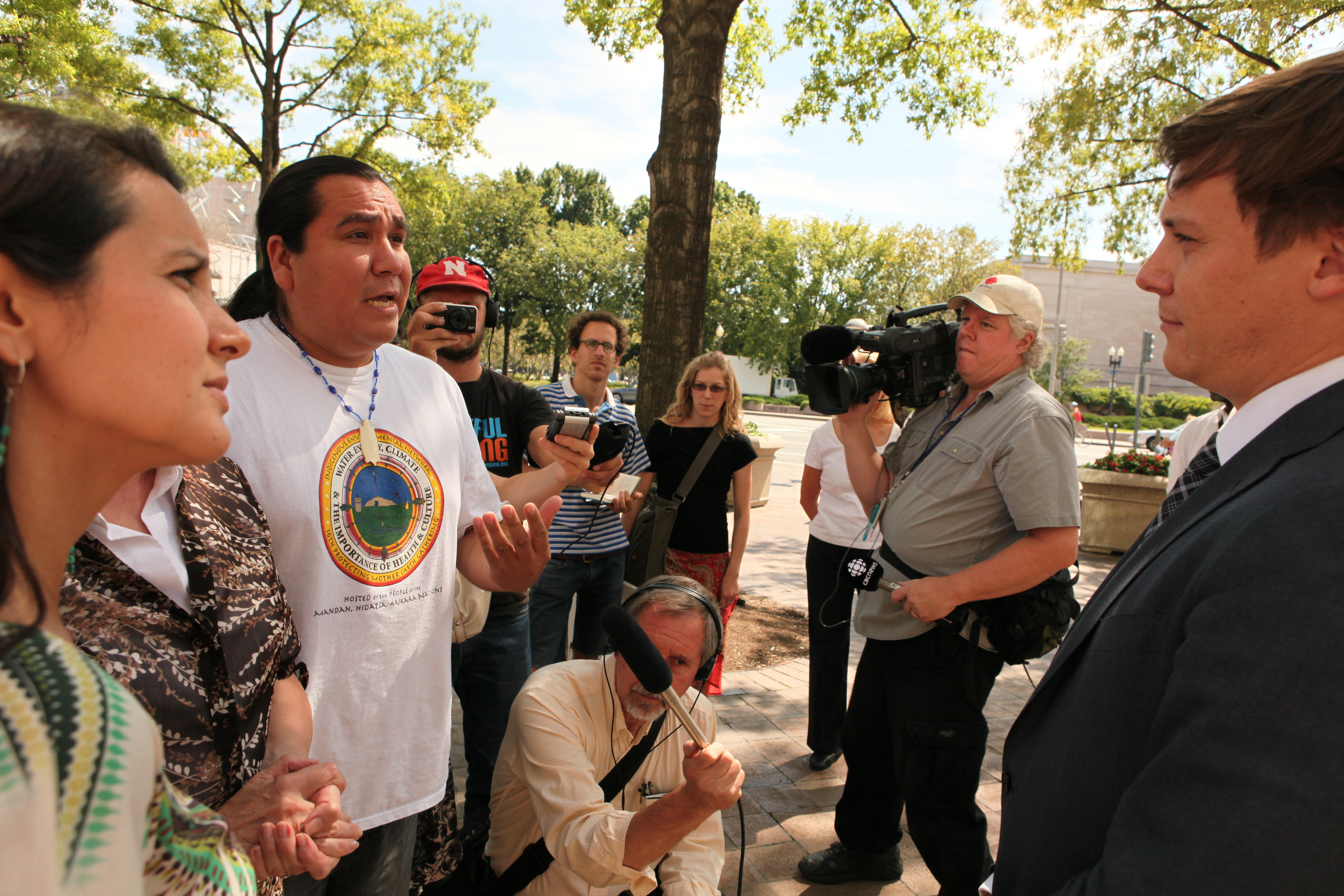
This image shows an interview being conducted of members of the Indigenous Environmental Network

Tom Goldtooth of the Indigenous Environmental Network has an overview of his position on US drilling and native lands.

1. Educate and empower Indigenous Peoples to address and develop strategies for the protection of our environment, our health, and all life forms – the Circle of Life.
2. Re-affirm our traditional knowledge and respect of natural laws.
3. Recognize, support, and promote environmentally sound lifestyles, economic livelihoods and to build healthy sustaining Indigenous communities.
4. Commitment to influence policies that affect Indigenous Peoples on a local, tribal, state, regional, national and international level.
5. Include youth and elders in all levels of our work.
6. Protect our human rights to practice our cultural and spiritual beliefs.

=== Beliefs in practice ===
Certain practices of coal mining, oil drilling, and fishing and hunting in the United States are said to directly infringe upon Native land and values. IEN tries to engage with the American public by raising consciousness about environmental issues that are known to have a particularly strong impact on indigenous peoples. One IEN action for this purpose was dedicating a day, October 13, 1996, to challenging Americans to consume as little energy as possible. The goal of this was to encourage people to think about how much energy they do in fact consume on a daily basis and how this impacts on native communities.

In 1991, at Bear Butte, South Dakota (a sacred site to many of the Plains Indians), the IEN established an Environmental Code of Ethics. Key points include that indigenous people culturally, and Native Americans politically, are tied to their land; Native Americans in the United States and Canada are restricted to reservations if they want to maintain any kind of nationalistic ideals; and that indigenous people often have religious or ancestral ties to specific tracts of land. This unique relationship makes it less likely for them to leave, makes the land more valuable, and makes them even more staunchly opposed to polluting it in any way.

== Spiritual activism ==
The IEN states that part of their mission is to protect and maintain sites sacred to, primarily, indigenous communities in North America. In addressing perceived injustices perpetuated against these peoples, they list protection of sacred, historical and culturally significant areas as one of their main goals. In doing so, they reference their love for Mother Earth as a driving force behind their activism. IEN recognizes humanity's connection to the Earth and believes their activism is restoring and furthering this connection.

The group holds "Protecting Mother Earth Gatherings", in which they discuss techniques and plans for protecting indigenous communities and lands. In their "Rights of Mother Earth" conference held in April 2004, they expressed their commitment in "creating a system of jurisprudence that sees and treats nature and Mother Earth as a fundamental, rights bearing entity." They also argued for a paradigm founded on indigenous thought as well as a philosophy that grants equal rights to nature and honors the interrelationship of all life forms on the planet.

== Environmental justice ==
=== Opposition to pipelines ===
The group began garnering more public attention in 2014, when they began a protest against the Keystone XL oil pipeline. Initial disputes over the pipeline had drawn the attention of the American public in 2011, when groups became concerned that the oil pipeline could contaminate nearby water sources, but this increased as the building of the pipeline was delayed. IEN was one of the larger organizations involved in the debate over the pipeline, allying with other environmentalist groups like the Sierra Club and 350.org.

IEN experienced another surge of media exposure in 2015 as protests against the Dakota Access oil pipeline gained attention. The pipeline is currently complete, with the exception of the section mapped to be located under Lake Oahe, which is a major water source for the native Sioux tribe of Standing Rock in North Dakota. After a federal order requiring protesters to leave the build sites of the pipeline, IEN stated publicly that they would not follow the order in an attempt to further delay the progression of the pipeline. Dallas Goldtooth, an organizer with IEN, told a reporter for The Washington Post that "We are staying here, committed to our prayer. Forced removal and state oppression? This is nothing new to us as native people."

Tom B.K. Goldtooth, founder of IEN, stated after President Donald Trump signed an executive order for the continuation of the building of the pipeline that "Donald Trump will not build his Dakota Access Pipeline without a fight. The granting of an easement, without any environmental review or tribal consultation, is not the end of this fight—it is the new beginning."

=== Conferences ===
IEN hosts annual conferences called the "Protecting Mother Earth Gatherings". The first conference was held in 1990 in Bear Butte, South Dakota. The conferences has changed location almost every year.

At the conference, members of the IEN come together to discuss the group's goals and projects in the upcoming year. Their resolutions are typically published on the internet soon after the end of each conference.

Past conference locations and projects include:

- The 1992 conference in Celilo Falls, Oregon, formerly a major salmon fishing site until dams were constructed on the Columbia River, downstream from the Hanford Nuclear Reservation.
- The 1993 conference at Sac and Fox Reservation, Oklahoma; IEN helped defeat a proposal for the establishment of a nuclear waste site.
- The 1994 conference on Mole Lake Indian Reservation, Wisconsin, where Exxon plans to open a huge zinc-copper mine upstream from the Mole Lake Chippewa's wild rice beds.
- The 2001 conference (the 12th Protecting Mother Earth Gathering) in Penticton, British Columbia, Canada, was the first to be held in Canada.
- The 2004 conference was again held near sacred Bear Butte, South Dakota.

In 2009, IEN introduced the "Red Road to Copenhagen" initiative; a delegation attended the 15th Session of the Conference of the Parties (COP-15) to the United Nations Framework Convention on Climate Change (UNFCCC) in Copenhagen. The Initiative statement reads: "...this initiative will bring accumulated traditional knowledge of Indigenous peoples from North America coming from climate-energy impact zones and persons experienced in linking an indigenous rights-based framework to climate policy."

IEN prioritizes multigenerational and intertribal organizing, and has specific youth and elders groups. It is governed partly by an Elders Council; their Youth Council solicits the involvement of young indigenous people and tries to make connections between urban youth culture and environmental issues faced by the communities.

Members of IEN were involved in the 2016 Dakota Access Pipeline protests, notably in the media coverage and in establishing the media tent at the Oceti Sakowin camp.

=== Other work ===
The POPs Treaty, now known as the Stockholm Convention after it was signed in May 2001 in Sweden, was designed to ban a number of pesticides and other chemicals from use. During the negotiations, IEN played a role in expressing to delegates what indigenous peoples wanted from the treaty. Throughout the period, the IEN met with delegates from all over the world in order to sensitise them on how indigenous peoples are impacted by POPs and their expectations from the treaty.

Reducing emissions from deforestation and forest degradation (REDD) is a policy mechanism designed to work for the preservation of global forests and it is backed by many influential environmental organizations like Greenpeace and Conservation International. REDD is centered around the idea of providing forest owners with financial incentive to preserve them. However, in accomplishing this, it also requires the relocation of indigenous peoples who reside in forests that are being targeted and is therefore very controversial among grassroots and indigenous organizations. IEN publicly opposes REDD, claiming that it is a direct violation of the rights of indigenous peoples to have autonomy over their own land.

The IEN opposes carbon taxes.
