= Tom B.K. Goldtooth =

Native American activist

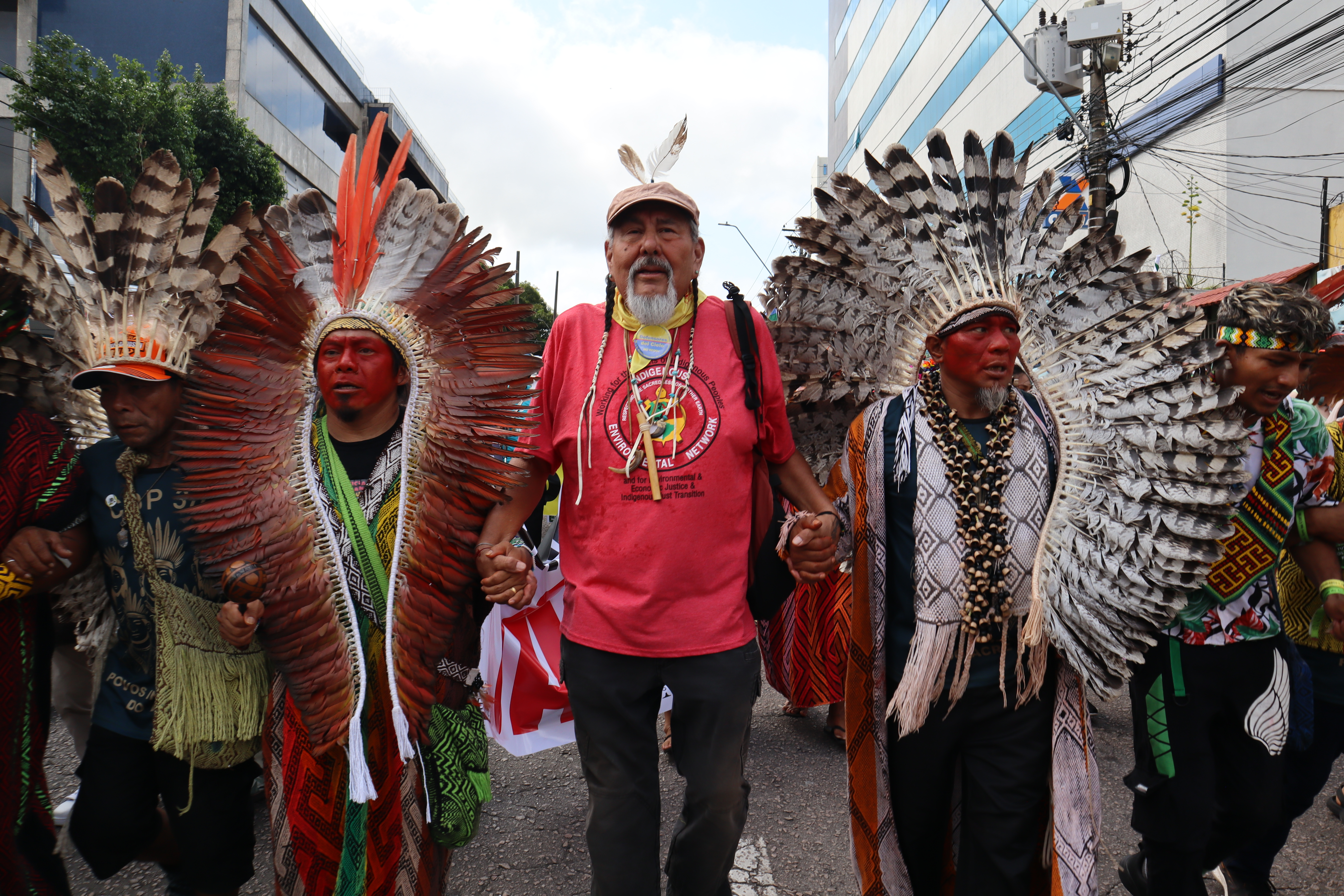
- Born: Bruce Kendall Goldtooth; 1953 (age 72–73); Farmington, New Mexico, U.S.
- Citizenship: Navajo Nation and U.S.
- Occupations: Executive Director of Indigenous Environmental Network; Environmental and Climate Justice activist Filmmaker
- Years active: 1980–present
- Known for: Activism on environmental, climate, energy, water and food justice; and on the indigenous rights and rights of Mother Earth
- Website: Indigenous Environmental Network; Indigenous Rising

Tom B.K. Goldtooth (born 1953) is a Native American environmental, climate, and economic justice activist, speaker, film producer, and Indigenous rights leader. He is active at local, national, and international levels as an advocate for building healthy and sustainable Indigenous communities based upon the foundation of Indigenous traditional knowledge. Goldtooth has served as executive director of the Indigenous Environmental Network (IEN) since 1996 after serving as a member of the IEN National Council since 1992.

Goldtooth (Dibe'lizhini' Clan) is an enrolled member of the Navajo Nation. He is also huŋka Bdewakaƞtoƞwaƞ Dakota from Minnesota. He is well known by his Dakota name of Mato Awaƞyaƞkapi, given to him by Pete Catches Sr. (Petaġa Yuha Mani), a Lakota holy man of the Spotted Eagle Way of the Oglala Lakota Nation. He currently resides near the headwaters of the Mississippi River in Bemidji, Minnesota.

== Early life ==
Goldtooth was born Bruce Kendall Goldtooth in Farmington, New Mexico, near the Navajo Nation. His mother is Norma Bell Lee, an enrolled member of the Navajo Nation and daughter of Melvin Lee (Dzi l t l'ahnii Clan) and Virginia Peslakai (Dibe'lizhini' Clan). She was the first Navajo and one of the first Native American women to earn an undergraduate degree in microbiology, subsequently running medical and hospital laboratories in California, Arizona, and on the Navajo Reservation (Arizona) as a professional medical technologist. Goldtooth's biological father's identity remains unknown, but he is believed to be of Native American descent. Tom was raised by his stepfather, Dennis Wesley Goldtooth, a member of the Navajo Nation from the Tuba City area. Dennis, a retired Navajo Nation policeman, is the son of Frank Goldtooth Sr., a renowned medicine man known as Bȅȅsh Biwoǫ (Iron-Metal [Gold] Tooth).

Goldtooth lived with his maternal grandparents in Farmington as a child while his mother attended college in San Diego. After his mother graduated and married former U.S. marine Dennis Goldtooth, the family moved back to the Navajo Nation. His stepfather became a Navajo Nation policeman stationed in Tuba City, Arizona, and later in the northwestern remote area of the reservation called Navajo Springs, near Marble Canyon, Arizona, and located in the area known as the Vermilion Cliffs-Colorado Plateau area located along the Colorado River.

Tom often stayed with his paternal grandmother, Margaret Goldtooth, in Tuba City, and frequently visited his grandfather, Bȅȅsh Biwoǫ. His mother worked as a medical technologist in Page, Arizona, a rural boom town in the 1960s that attracted workers from across the country for the construction of the Glen Canyon Dam, the second-largest dam in the United States. Page eventually became a tourist center for water recreation due to the damming of the Colorado River and the creation of Lake Powell. Tom attended high school in Page. Later, his parents moved from Navajo Springs to Page.

During these years, Tom Goldtooth became active in the Boy Scouts of America and earned his Life Scout award. He was a candidate for the Eagle Scout award, almost completing the requirements, but moved away from Page to Winslow when his mother relocated. In recognition of his youth leadership he was initiated into the Order of the Arrow. He later received the Vigil Honor, as the highest honor that the Order of the Arrow can bestow upon its members. The early scouting experience along with following the Goldtooth family tradition as cattle and horse ranchers along with the Navajo Hunter Way culture and Diné ceremonies, became the building blocks for his leadership in years to come. Through family hunting trips in Arizona, Goldtooth became an outdoor enthusiast and learned to respect and protect the environment.

== Career ==
Goldtooth enrolled at Arizona State University in 1971 with the goal of earning a degree in Industrial Design within the Department of Engineering. He left school in 1973, enlisting in the U.S. Army and becoming a Finance and Accounting Specialist within the Army's payroll division. Goldtooth was stationed at Fort Lewis, Washington and later became active in the Army's Human Relations program, with a goal of undoing racism. Tom became a leader organizing Native soldiers to build solidarity in the post-Vietnam era. Tom was honorable discharged in 1976 and became active in the Puget Sound Native communities in sports, pow-wows and social activities. Tom earned his Associates of Arts (AA) degree from Tacoma Community College (TCC) in Human Services. He was also a Peer Counselor at TCC, helping Native students pursue their higher education goals. As a young man, he volunteered as a board member of the Tacoma Indian Center. It was during this time that he decided to pursue a social work degree that would allow him to work with the social welfare needs of Native American families. After obtaining his AA degree from TCC, he enrolled into the Social Work (Welfare) Program of Pacific Lutheran University but did not finish his degree upon deciding to move to the Navajo Nation (NN).

Goldtooth was hired as Fort Defiance Regional Bi-State Social Services Director of the NN. Through his experience in the Puget Sound region of Washington State in American Indian Child Welfare Act hearings and learning from Northwest Coast Native women about the needs for the protection of children and families, Tom provided leadership in strengthening casework in domestic and sexual abuse cases on the Navajo reservation. Following working on the Navajo reservation, Tom moved with his family to the Lower Sioux Community in southwest Minnesota in 1981.

Goldtooth later became the executive director of the St. Paul American Indian Center, commuting back and forth from rural Minnesota to St. Paul. He developed the American Indian Family Services program, which included an Indian foster care program. It was Wilford Gurneau, Red Lake Anishinaabe, that is credited with helping Tom develop Minnesota State's first all-Indian urban foster care program. It was at the St. Paul American Indian Center that Tom developed the Back to Mother Earth Program that would provide an opportunity for Native children and parents to re-learn indigenous agricultural ways with urban gardening and taking families into the country to learn cultural ways of building lodges, skinning game animals and tanning and sweat lodge ceremonies. In the mid-80's Tom formed a small-scale residential/commercial demolition business that recycled deconstruction materials.

In 1991, Goldtooth became the Coordinator of the Red Lake Nation environmental program focusing on closing three open landfill dumps. It was during this time that he discovered Tribes did not have the capacity for implementing needed environmental protection programs on Native lands. In 1991, he was selected by Native people attending the First National People of Color Environmental Leadership Summit held on October 24–27, 1991, in Washington DC as the Native spokesperson in the Summit's plenary sessions. This launched Goldtooth's leadership in environmental and economic justice within Native lands that would continue for years to come.

Goldtooth currently serves as the executive director of the Indigenous Environmental Network, based in Bemidji, Minnesota.

== Activism ==
Goldtooth has been a presence within the Native American community and with Indigenous Peoples globally for over three decades, advocating and organizing with Native-Indigenous communities for environmental and economic justice on a local, national and international level. He holds the indigenous portfolio work on policy issues of environmental protection, climate change, energy, biodiversity, environmental health, water and sustainable development. Goldtooth co-authored the REDD (Reducing Emissions from Deforestation and Degradation) booklet on the risks of implementing the REDD (a mechanism of carbon trading and carbon offsets) program in indigenous territories. He is a member of the International Indigenous Peoples Forum on Climate Change — the UNFCCC's indigenous caucus. Goldtooth is a board member of the Science & Environmental Health Network, a member of the Global Alliance on the Rights of Nature, a member of the Steering Committee of the Climate Justice Alliance (CJA) and Coordinating Committee member of Grassroots for Global Justice (GGJ).

Goldtooth also collaborated with Melissa Nelson, executive director of the Cultural Conservancy Project, in San Francisco to establish the first Bioneers Conference Indigenous Forum, starting in 2007. Goldtooth also co-produced "Drumbeat for Mother Earth," an award-winning documentary which explored toxic and synthetic chemicals contaminating the food web, violating indigenous rights set forth in treaties between the United States and Indigenous nations who are situated between their borders, and the cumulative consequences that exposures to these chemicals causes as they bio-accumulate and bio-magnify in the bodies of Native-Indigenous women, children and men that is passed from one generation to the next. Goldtooth's participation as an Indigenous non-governmental organization (NGO) observer in the UN Intergovernmental Negotiating Committee (INC) meetings from 1998 to 2000, in partnership with Sheila Watt-Cloutier, then President of the Inuit Circumpolar Council (ICC), elevated the issue of human rights – rights of Indigenous Peoples in these global INC meetings negotiating the reduction of and elimination of 12 toxic chemicals called POPs, which is defined as "chemical substances that persist in the environment, bio-accumulate through the food web, and pose a risk of causing adverse effects to human health and the environment".

== Awards and honors ==
Goldtooth was awarded the Gandhi Peace Award in 2015. In 2010, he was honored by both the NAACP and the Sierra Club as a "Green Hero of Color."

== Personal life ==
Goldtooth currently resides in Bemidji, Minnesota, near the headwaters of the Mississippi River. His son, Dallas Goldtooth was the Keystone XL campaign organizer for the Indigenous Environmental Network, Dakota language-instructor, writer, artist, and member of the comedy troupe The 1491s.
