= Wasting My Time (disambiguation) =

"Wasting My Time" is a 2001 song by Default.

Wasting My Time may also refer to:

- "Wasting My Time", a 1981 song by Klaus Nomi from Klaus Nomi
- "Wasting My Time", a 2000 song by the Spice Girls from Forever
- "Wasting My Time", a 1993 song by Take That from Everything Changes
- "Wasting My Time", a 1999 song by The White Stripes from The White Stripes

== See also ==
- Wasting Time (disambiguation)
- Waste My Time (disambiguation)
