= Diné CARE =

Diné activist organization

- Logo currently used by the organization.
- Founded: 1988
- Headquarters: Dilkon, AZ.
- Website: https://www.dine-care.org/

Map of the Navajo Nation.

Diné C.A.R.E. is a Diné (Navajo) activist organization that works on environmental, cultural, and social justice campaigns, primarily within the Navajo Nation and the surrounding areas. Diné translates to "The People" and CARE stands for Citizens Against Ruining Our Environment. Diné CARE played an important role in building the early environmental justice movement in the United States. Their work has included opposing the creation of toxic waste infrastructure, polluting energy projects, industrial-scale logging, advocating for compensation for people impacted by uranium mining and weapons development as well as opposing business practices that facilitate abuse of alcohol in nearby Gallup. The organization also led a campaign to increase Native voter turnout during the 2020 presidential election.

== History ==
Originally called CARE, the group was founded in 1988 to prevent the construction of a hazardous waste incinerator in the community of Dilkon on the Navajo Nation. Their activism also led to the creation of the annual Protecting Mother Earth conferences. The first was held in Dilkon in 1990, funded by Greenpeace and Seventh Generation Fund. The creation of Indigenous Environmental Network came out of the Protecting Mother Earth gatherings in Dilkon, and in 1991, in South Dakota.

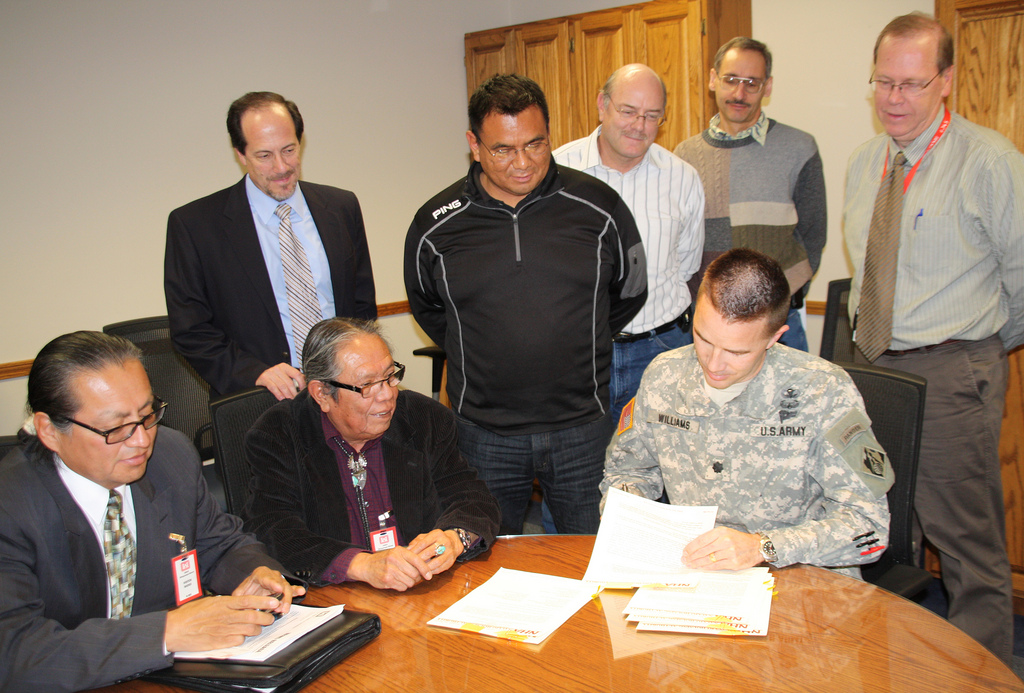
Diné CARE co-founder Earl Tulley, at left, in 2012.

CARE became Diné CARE at a 1991 meeting in Gallup that brought together activists from the Dilkon anti-incinerator activism with other activism taking place across the Navajo nation including alcohol use in Gallup, oil and gas exploration, uranium mining (which had occurred extensively during the Cold War era, particularly from the 1940s through the 1980s), logging, and asbestos dumping. Co-founders included Lori Goodman, Leroy Jackson, Adella Begaye, Earl Tulley and others. Leroy Jackson, who received death threats in response to his work to reform the logging industry's operations on the Chuska Mountains, died in 1994. Press coverage suggests he may have been murdered for his activism.

== Funding ==
Diné CARE operates as a grassroots nonprofit organization, supported primarily through foundation grants rather than membership fees. In addition to foundation grants, Diné CARE operates through community organizing and partnerships with other environmental and Indigenous advocacy organizations.

== Projects ==
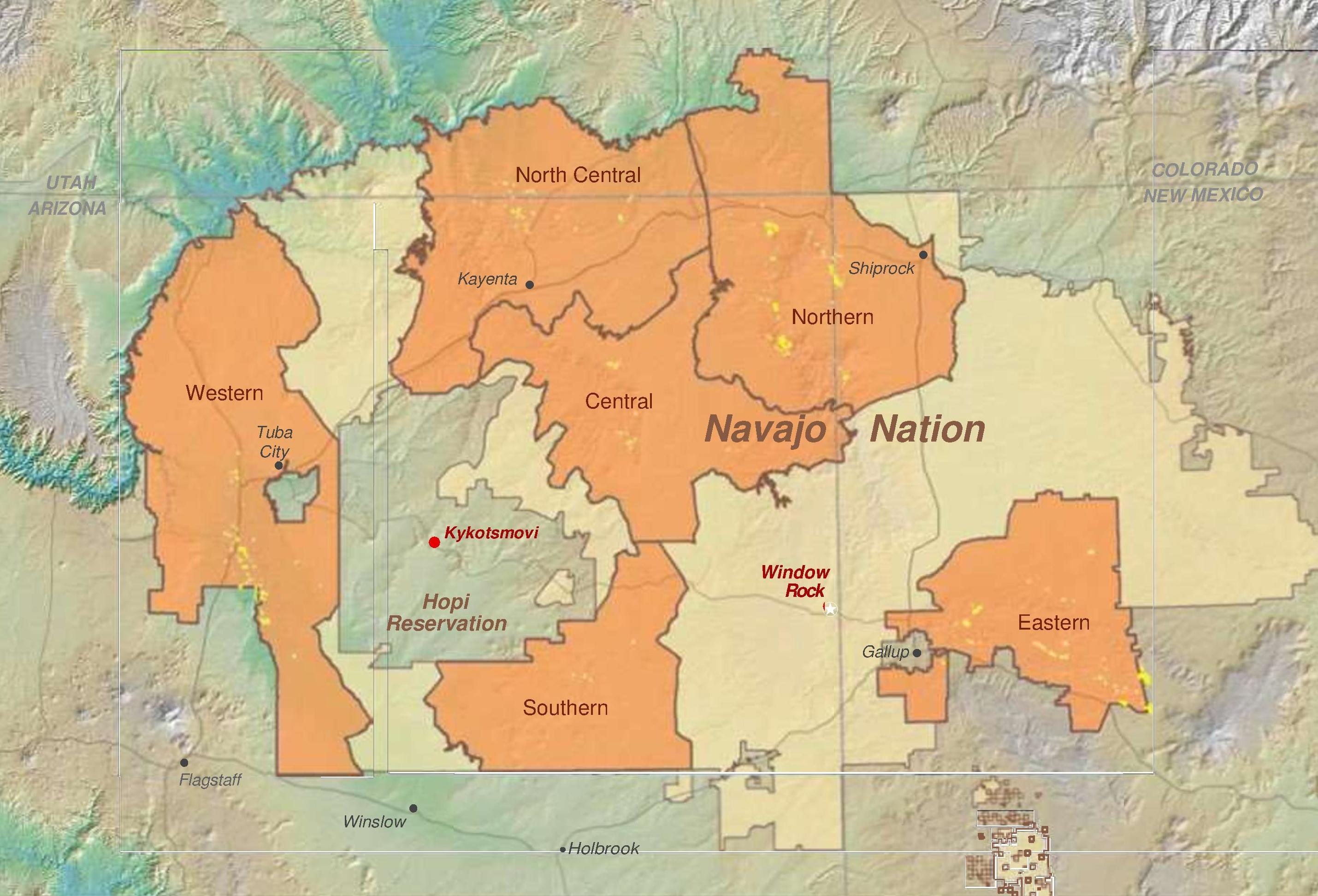
Shaded-relief map of the Navajo Nation and Hopi Reservation, marking where abandoned uranium mines are located in yellow. Marked in orange are the six regions where mines were clustered: North Central, Northern, Central, Eastern, Southern, and Western.

=== Nuclear Waste & Uranium ===
Diné CARE has put increased efforts into mitigation and reparations for damage caused by radiation poisoning since 1998. Their goals centering around extending relief to victims of uranium mining and Cold War bomb testing, to instigate further cleanup efforts on mines that have been abandoned, and prevent any further attempts to mine uranium in the Navajo region.

==== Radiation Exposure Compensation Act (RECA) Reform ====
As part of the Navajo Radiation Victims Project, Diné CARE organized members of the community to advocate for reforms of the Radiation Exposure Compensation Act (originally passed in 1990) to expand the reach of reparations for victims of radiation poisoning throughout the region. Two organizations, Utah Navajo Downwinders Association and the Arizona Downwinders Association, were formed with Diné CARE's assistance, and along with the Eastern Agency RECA reform coalition, the Post 71 Navajo Uranium Miners Association, and the Kayenta Chapter RECA reform effort, the RECA reform group of the Navajo Nation was assembled.

Ten points of resolution were formed to adjust the RECA bill that would be enacted by The Radiation Workers Justice Act of 1998, which was introduced March 24, 1998.

=== Forestry ===
Diné CARE has led anti-logging campaigns, protected the forests of Black Mesa and the Chuska Mountains, and supports restoration efforts for the forests of the Chuska Mountains to repair the damages caused by excessive logging in the Navajo Region.

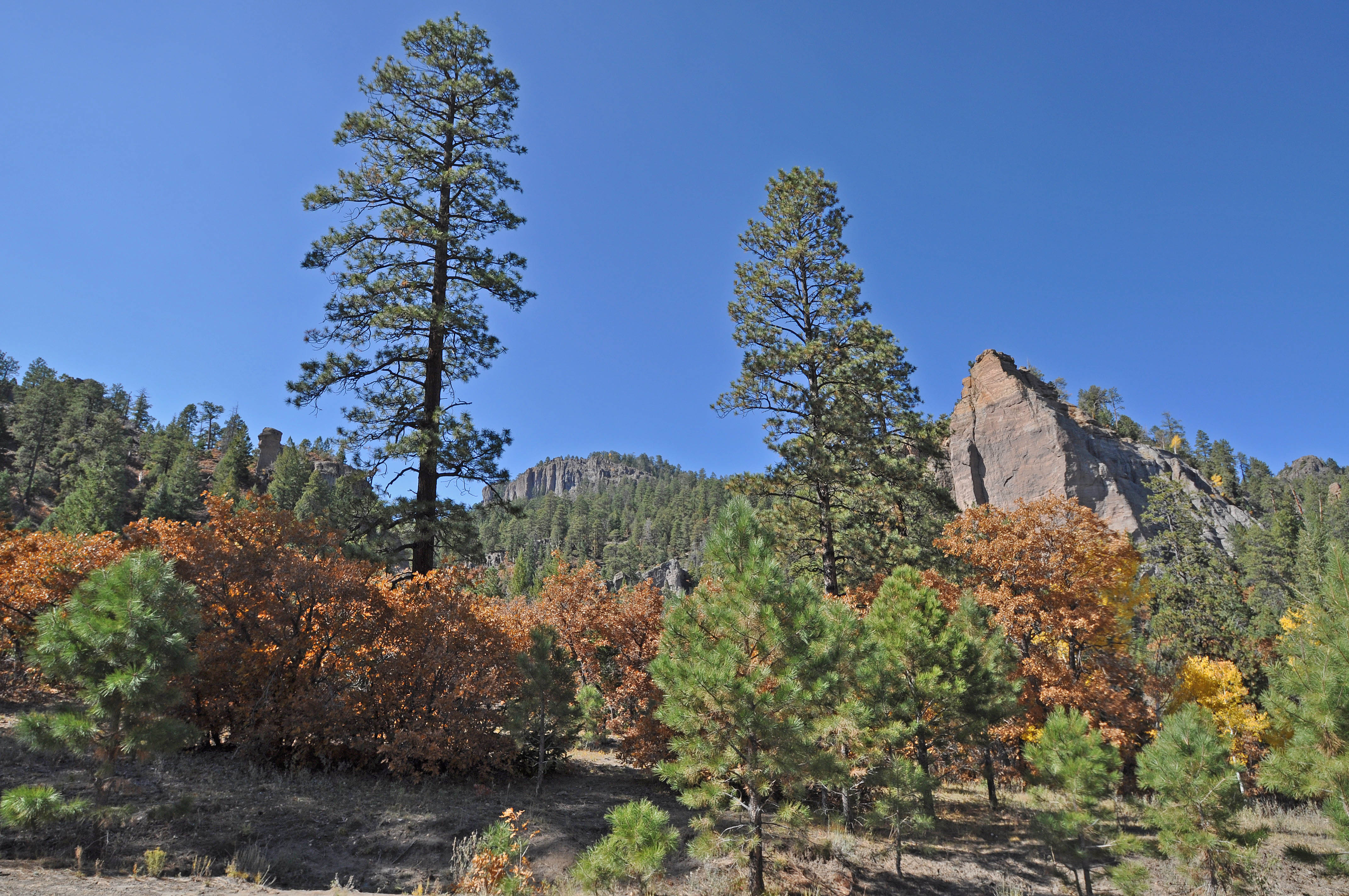
Pine forests in the Chuska Mountains on the Navajo Nation.

==== Navajo Forest Project Industries Anti-Logging Campaign ====
Diné CARE led a successful anti-logging campaign against Navajo Forest Project Industries (NFPI), largely organized by Leroy Jackson. In May of 1992, an administrative appeal with the Bureau of Indian Affairs (BIA) was filed to prevent further timber sales of the NFPI, which was eventually rejected but succeeded in stalling logging in the area. Further legal and environmental concerns led to the NFPI to reduce their logging area to half its original size, 36 million to 18 million board-feet, and assured Diné CARE they would avoid logging in the regions more sensitive areas. As a result, 82 workers were laid off from their jobs at NFPI. Jackson discovered that the NFPI was around $8 million in debt, as opposed to their claim that it was only $2.6 million, and the mill was issued a full audit. Some reports suggest that Jackson's murder may be linked to anti-logging activism.

==== Black Mesa Hydropower Storage Project Rejections ====
In February of 2024, three proposed hydropower storage projects to be located southeast of Kayenta were rejected by federal officials, saving around 40 miles of the Black Mesa from destruction. Along with the rejection, a new policy was implemented that demanded no projects could be issued on Tribal lands without explicit Tribal support. Diné CARE had urged the commission to reject the construction of the projects the year prior (2023).

=== Coal Retirement ===
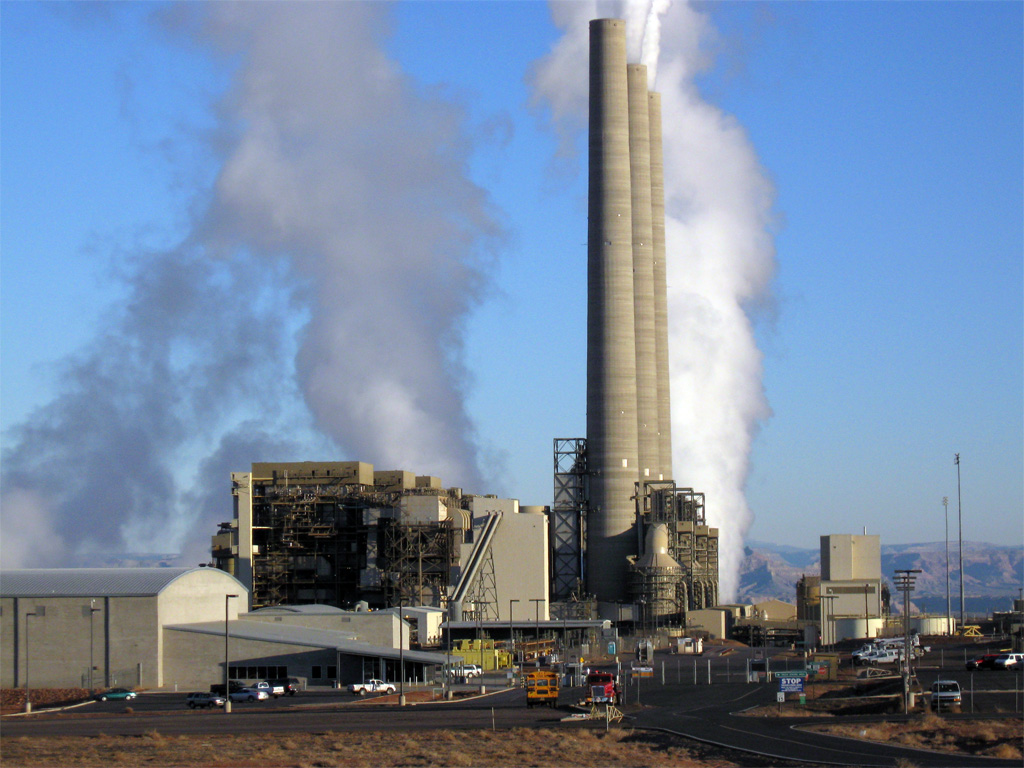
Navajo Power Plant: Formerly located in Page, Arizona, the Navajo Generating Station had three 750-megawatt units. It's 236-meter chimneys were among the tallest in the state, and at full capacity it consumed up to 25,000 tons of coal daily before its demolition in 2020.

Diné CARE has been active in the transition away from coal to clean energy for the Navajo Nation. While there are potential economic costs associated with the loss of coal power plant jobs and coal markets, Diné CARE believes the switch paves the way for the reclamation of depleted aquifers and the creation of a new clean energy economy that listens to the local community. Diné CARE has described the depletion of the Navajo Aquifer at Black Mesa as one of the long term environmental impacts associated with coal extraction in the region. The Navajo Nation’s move towards clean energy has been prioritized following the codification of Diné Fundamental Law in 2002, which reflects the cultural belief that Diné are protectors of the environment. This has influenced the decreases in coal energy and other energy policy decisions.

A major step in coal retirement by Diné CARE was in the battle against the proposed Desert Rock Power Plant, which began in 2003. They commissioned a report in 2008 on viable energy alternatives in response to public input on environmental injustices. The report concluded that even though the coal royalties paid higher, it would be more financially beneficial in the long-run to transition to clean energy. Desert Rock was ultimately cancelled in March 2011, and more coal mine and power plant shutdowns followed in later years, including the closure of the Navajo Generating Station in 2019.

While Diné CARE has supported the transition away from coal, some community members and stakeholders have raised concerns about job loses and economic impacts associated with the closure of coal plants and mines. These concerns highlight ongoing debates within the Navajo Nation about balancing environmental protection with economic stability.

=== Just Transition ===
In 2020, Diné CARE, Tó Nizhóní Ání, and San Juan Citizens Alliance reached an agreement with Arizona Public Service (APS). Under this agreement, APS committed to paying a $144 million dollar “Just and Equitable Transition” assistance package to communities affected by the 2019 Navajo Generating Station closure, in addition to those that will be affected by the scheduled closure of the Four Corners Generating Station in 2031. The amount would be distributed over a ten-year period. Of the total, $127 million was designated for the Navajo Nation. In 2021, the Arizona Corporation Commission, the regulatory body overseeing APS, approved $40 million in transition assistance, representing an approximate 70 percent reduction from the original proposal.

Diné CARE advocacy is closely connected to Diné cultural values, including the concept of stewardship and responsibility to protect the land. These principles are reflected in the Diné Fundamental Law, which emphasizes the role of Diné people as caretakers of the environment.

==== Carbon Capture and Sequestration (CCS) ====
Diné CARE has also engaged in discussions surrounding carbon capture and sequestration (CCS), particularly in the early 2020s. CCS is a technology designed to capture carbon dioxide emissions and store them thousands of feet below the Earth's surface in porous rock formations. Diné CARE's engagement with CCS is connected to the seven percent acquisition of the Four Corners Generating Station by Navajo Transitional Energy Company (NTEC) in 2018. With the plant scheduled to close in 2031, NTEC has proposed a project known as NavEnergy Hub, which would incorporate CCS technology at Four Corners to allow for continued operation. Although the power plant represents an economic resource for the Navajo Nation, Diné CARE has expressed concerns that CCS may enable the continued use of fossil fuels under the label of "clean energy". The organization has emphasized the importance of community awareness, consultation, and consent before these projects are developed on or near Tribal lands.

== Impact ==
Diné CARE had played a significant role in the development of the environmental justice movement in the United States, particularly in Indigenous communities. Its early activism contributed to the formation of the Indigenous Environmental Network in 1991, which has become a major international network for Indigenous environmental advocacy.

The organizations work on uranium mining and radiation exposure has helped bring national attention to the long-term health and environmental impacts faced by Navajo communities, including contamination from abandoned uranium mines. Diné CARE has also influenced policy discussions around Tribal sovereignty, particularly in advocating for the requirement of Tribal consent for development projects on Indigenous land.

== See also ==
- Traditional ecological knowledge
