= Road apple =

A road apple is a term for animal feces, often on a road and/or from a horse.

Road apple may also refer to:

- Road Apples (album), an album by The Tragically Hip
- "Road Apples" (The Ren & Stimpy Show), an episode
- The Road Apples, a 1970s one-hit wonder
- Road apple (computer), models of Macintosh computers with a particularly bad technical design according to Low End Mac
- Road apple (social engineering), removable media with malicious software left in opportunistic or conspicuous places
