= Wasted Time =

Wasted Time(s) may refer to:

== Songs ==
- "Wasted Time" (Eagles song), 1976
- "Wasted Time" (Fuel song), 2007
- "Wasted Time" (Keith Urban song), 2016
- "Wasted Time" (Kings of Leon song), 2003
- "Wasted Time" (Skid Row song), 1991
- "Wasted Time" (Vance Joy song), 2014
- "Wasted Times" (The Weeknd song), 2018
- "Wasted Time", by Bret Michaels from Custom Built, 2010
- "Wasted Time", by Cloves, 2018
- "Wasted Time", by Europe from Wings of Tomorrow, 1984
- "Wasted Time", by Heavenly from Virus, 2006
- "Wasted Time", by Holy Knights from Between Daylight and Pain, 2012
- "Wasted Time", by Lionel Richie from Renaissance, 2000

== Other uses ==
- The Wasted Times, a 2016 Chinese-Hong Kong film

== See also ==
- Wasting Time (disambiguation)
- Wasting My Time (disambiguation)
- "Waste Time", a song by the Fire Theft from their self-titled album
