= Wasteland (The Jam album) =

Compilation album by The Jam
- Released: 19 October 1992
- Genre: Punk rock, new wave, power pop, mod revival
- Label: Pickwick Records

The Jam chronology
Extras (1992)	Wasteland (1992)	Live Jam (1993)

Professional ratings
Review scores
Source	Rating
AllMusic	2/5 stars

Wasteland is a budget-priced compilation by The Jam released in 1992.

== Track listing ==
All songs written by Paul Weller except as noted.

1. "News of the World" (Bruce Foxton)
2. "Burning Sky"
3. "Saturday's Kids"
4. "Art School"
5. "In the Street Today" (Paul Weller/David Waller)
6. "Non-Stop Dancing"
7. "Wasteland"
8. "In the City"
9. "Strange Town"
10. "Standards"
11. "A-Bomb in Wardour Street"
12. "In the Crowd"
13. "London Girl"
14. "David Watts" (Ray Davies)
15. "I Got By in Time"
16. "All Around the World"
