= Wastelanding =

2015 non-fiction book by Traci Brynne Voyles

- Author: Traci Brynne Voyles
- Subject: Uranium mining and the Navajo people
- Genre: Non-fiction
- Publisher: University of Minnesota Press
- Publication date: May 15 2015
- Pages: 304
- ISBN: 978-0816692675

Wastelanding: Legacies of Uranium Mining in Navajo Country is a 2015 non-fiction book by Traci Brynne Voyles.

The book documents the history of uranium mining in the Navajo Nation.

== Publication ==
Wastelanding is a 2015 non-fiction book by Traci Brynne Voyles.

== Synopsis ==
The book contains the perspectives of historians, environmental activists, and gender experts. The book uses the Navajo (Diné) names for places, as part of the author's wider attempts to document things from a decolonised perspective. The author is critical of non-Indigenous leadership's attempts to portray Navajo lands as empty, as wastelands, to make the extraction of uranium easier, avoiding the need to consider the needs of the land's Indigenous inhabitants.

The book starts with the U.S. military attacking the Navajo and destroying their crops in 1864. It notes the 1930s permission given to companies to develop resources, as government scientists declared the land as "barren" and started efforts to reduce Navajo Nation's cattle numbers. 1940s accounts of history note the rise in global demand for uranium for nuclear power, 1950s discovery of uranium by Navajo shepherd Paddy Martinez, falsely attributed to luck and not knowledge.

The book concludes with the author's push for society to adopt truthful, non-colonial versions of history, and illustrates how uranium mines are located on places sacred to the Navajo people, examples include Tsoodzil. The book notes over 2,000 abandoned uranium mines remain on Navajo land, with contamination affecting land, water, and people.

== Critical reception ==
The American Historical Review praised Voyles for her careful use of language, avoiding common colonial mistakes. The review, by Samuel R Cook, praises the author for her rigorous analysis, but describes the presentation as "in some ways cynical". Cook describes the book as impressive, but notes that the author avoided the topic of tribal government's role in resource extraction, although calls this an "excusable oversight".

Kathleen Chamberlain, writing in Ethnohistory described the book as "outstanding", "well-written" and "thoroughly documented." Michael A. Amundson of Northern Arizona University described the book as "thought-provoking".

== See also ==
- Uranium mining and the Navajo people
