= Dilkon, Arizona =

CDP in Navajo County, Arizona

Dilkon, Arizona Tó' Álch'ídí (Navajo) Tsézhin Dilkǫǫh (Navajo)
- CDP
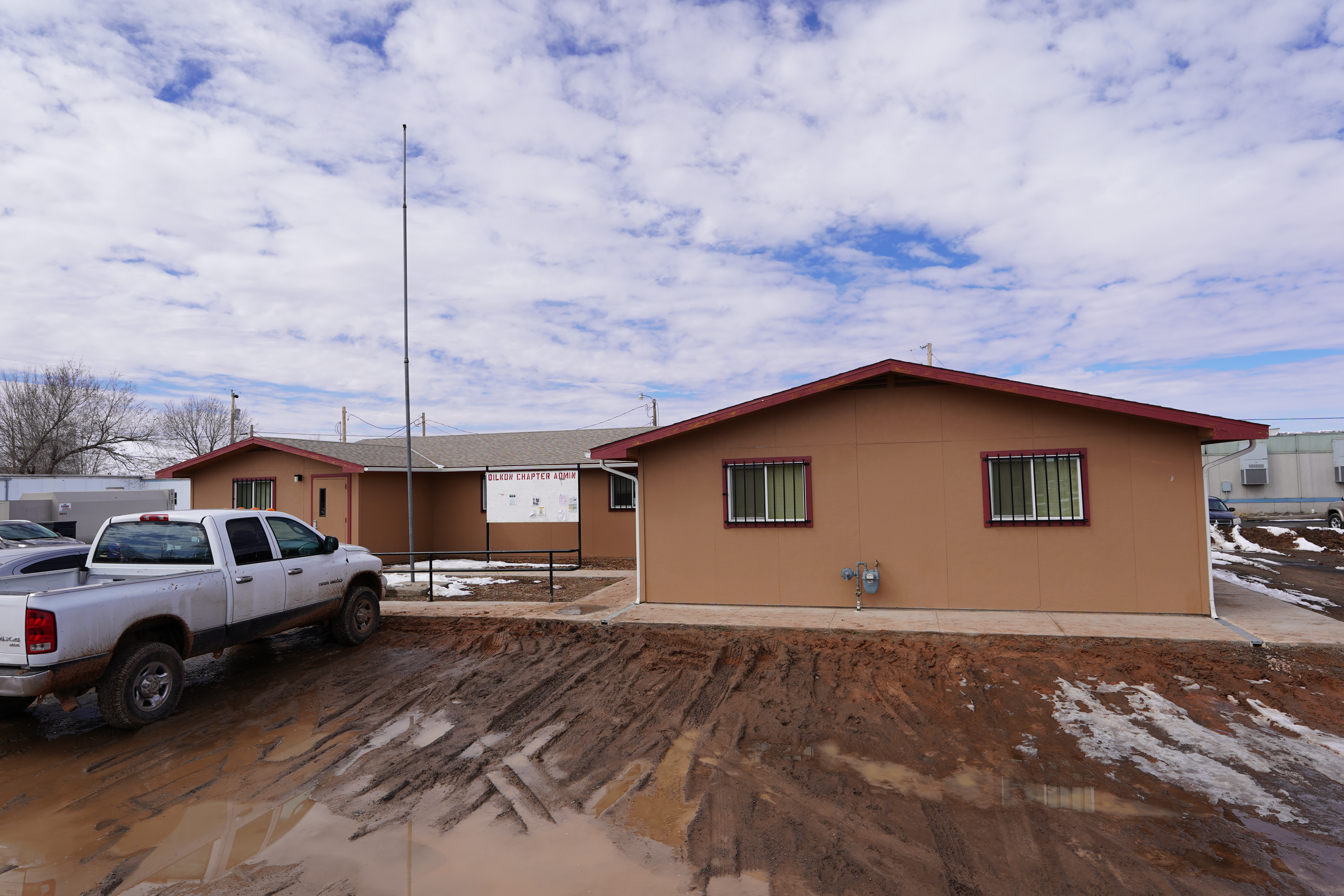
- Dilkon Chapter Admin building

- Location in Navajo County and the state of Arizona

- Location in the United States
- Coordinates: 35°21′52″N 110°19′13″W
- Country: United States
- State: Arizona
- County: Navajo

Area
  - Total: 16.58 sq mi (42.93 km^{2})
  - Land: 16.57 sq mi (42.92 km^{2})
  - Water: 0 sq mi (0.00 km^{2})
- Elevation: 5,885 ft (1,794 m)

Population (2020)
  - Total: 1,194
  - Density: 72.1/sq mi (27.82/km^{2})
- Time zone: UTC-7 (MST)
  - Summer (DST): UTC-6 (MDT)
- ZIP code: 86047
- Area code: 928
- FIPS code: 04-19280
- GNIS feature ID: 24399

Dilkon (Navajo: Tó' Álch'ídí or Tsézhin Dilkǫǫh) is a census-designated place (CDP) in Navajo County, Arizona, United States. The population was 1,184 at the 2010 census. The name of the town is said to be derived from the Navajo phrase "Smooth black rock" or "Bare surface.”

== Government ==
Dilkon Chapter is one of 110 certified chapters of the Navajo Nation local. As of December 21, 2010, the chapter has achieved Local Governance Certification. Council delegates: Jerry Freddie (four terms), Elmer Begay (2 terms) Chapter president: Lorenzo lee Sr. Chapter vice president: Chapter secretary: Chapter treasure:

Past Council delegates:

Manual Shirley 1978–1990
Alfred Joe 1990–1994
Elmer Clark 1990–1994

== Geography ==
Dilkon is located at 35°21′38″N 110°18′56″W (35.3606096, -110.3155400). It is located on the Colorado Plateau and within the area of the Hopi Buttes volcanic field.

According to the United States Census Bureau, the CDP has a total area of 16.8 square miles (44 km^{2}), all land.

== Demographics ==
=== Language ===
Languages (2000)	Percent
Spoke Navajo at home	71.3%
Spoke English at home	28.7%

Historical population
Census	Pop.	Note	%±
2000	1,265		—
2010	1,184		−6.4%
2020	1,194		0.8%
U.S. Decennial Census

=== 2020 census ===
As of the 2020 census, Dilkon had a population of 1,194. The median age was 31.9 years. 32.2% of residents were under the age of 18 and 13.7% of residents were 65 years of age or older. For every 100 females there were 87.7 males, and for every 100 females age 18 and over there were 81.4 males age 18 and over.

0.0% of residents lived in urban areas, while 100.0% lived in rural areas.

There were 330 households in Dilkon, of which 46.4% had children under the age of 18 living in them. Of all households, 38.5% were married-couple households, 13.9% were households with a male householder and no spouse or partner present, and 39.1% were households with a female householder and no spouse or partner present. About 15.8% of all households were made up of individuals and 6.6% had someone living alone who was 65 years of age or older.

There were 401 housing units, of which 17.7% were vacant. The homeowner vacancy rate was 0.0% and the rental vacancy rate was 9.6%.

Racial composition as of the 2020 census
Race	Number	Percent
White	11	0.9%
Black or African American	1	0.1%
American Indian and Alaska Native	1,141	95.6%
Asian	2	0.2%
Native Hawaiian and Other Pacific Islander	2	0.2%
Some other race	0	0.0%
Two or more races	37	3.1%
Hispanic or Latino (of any race)	13	1.1%

=== 2000 census ===
As of the census of 2000, there were 1,265 people, 298 households, and 264 families residing in the CDP. The population density was 75.4 inhabitants per square mile (29.1/km^{2}). There were 379 housing units at an average density of 22.6 per square mile (8.7/km^{2}). The racial makeup of the CDP was 97.0% Native American, 1.6% White, <0.1% Asian, Pacific Islander, or Black/African American, 0.4% from other races, and 1.0% from two or more races. 1.8% of the population were Hispanic or Latino of any race.

There were 298 households, out of which 61.4% had children under the age of 18 living with them, 50.0% were married couples living together, 31.2% had a female householder with no husband present, and 11.1% were non-families. 10.1% of all households were made up of individuals, and 2.0% had someone living alone who was 65 years of age or older. The average household size was 4.24 and the average family size was 4.50.

In the CDP, the population was spread out, with 46.8% under the age of 18, 10.6% from 18 to 24, 23.8% from 25 to 44, 14.3% from 45 to 64, and 4.5% who were 65 years of age or older. The median age was 19 years. For every 100 females, there were 89.4 males. For every 100 females age 18 and over, there were 84.4 males.

The median income for a household in the CDP was $16,146, and the median income for a family was $14,966. Males had a median income of $16,786 versus $18,846 for females. The per capita income for the CDP was $5,949. About 56.1% of families and 59.1% of the population were below the poverty line, including 65.8% of those under age 18 and 76.5% of those age 65 or over.

== Education ==
Much of the area is served by the Holbrook Unified School District, while a portion of Dilkon is zoned to Joseph City Unified School District.

Nearby Indian Wells Elementary School serves Dilkon.

- Holbrook Junior High School and Holbrook High School, in Holbrook, serve Dilkon.
- Winslow Junior High School, Winslow
- Winslow High School, Winslow

== Environmental movement ==
In 1988, Waste-Tech Services, Inc. approached and was approved by the tribal government of Dilkon, Arizona to build a $40 million recycling plant. It was hoped this project could bring 200 jobs to Dilkon; an area with 75% unemployment at this point. Further research revealed to the community that the recycling plant would instead be a toxic waste dump where waste was trucked in from California, Nevada, and Colorado to be burned in Dilkon. Public outrage built when it was discovered that medical human waste, including amputated limbs, would also be burned at this location. The Navajo believe that the dead are to be respected and this process appeared to them extremely disrespectful. To combat the possibility of a Waste-Tech Services, Inc. facility, the citizens created the organization Citizens Against Ruining Our Environment (CARE). Co-founded by Lori Goodman and Abe Plummer, CARE was able to reduce the project’s credibility in Dilkon. On February 25, 1989, Waste-Tech Services, Inc. and its partner company High-Tech Recycling, Inc. put on a public hearing and brought in a panel of engineers to discuss the project, in hopes of gaining back public favor. The final citizen’s vote was ninety-nine opposed to the project, six for the project. On March 6, tribal leaders unanimously rescinded their approval of the project. CARE had successfully blocked the possibility of a toxic waste dump on their land. Shortly after this success other Navajo grassroots environmental groups began to form to fight the overwhelming environmental racism stacked against them. Due to the lower lack of wealth and education on American Indian reservations, and their status as a minority, the U.S. government has allowed the encroachment of mining and energy companies for over 40 years to develop the Diné lands, creating environmental and health devastation and loss of aquifer water resources. CARE found that its success could benefit the other struggling organizations, so they banded together into a conglomerate environmental group representing all of the Navajo people, called Diné CARE. (Diné simply means "The People" and it is what the Navajo call themselves.)

== Notable people ==
- Cherilyn Yazzie, politician, farmer, entrepreneur
