= Wasting Time =

Wasting Time may refer to:

- Idleness, a lack of motion or energy
- Goofing off, engaging in an idle pastime while neglecting obligations
- Procrastination, avoidance of doing a task
- Running out the clock, in sports, stalling or playing with the purpose of allowing time to expire
- Time sink, an activity, especially one seen as wasteful, that consumes a significant amount of time

== Music ==
=== Albums ===
- Wasting Time, by Mest, 2000

=== Songs ===
- "Wasting Time" (Blink-182 song), 1996
- "Wasting Time" (Brent Faiyaz song), 2021
- "Wasting Time" (Thirsty Merc song), 2003
- "Wasting Time", by Collective Soul from Hints Allegations and Things Left Unsaid, 1994
- "Wasting Time", by Jack Johnson from On and On, 2003
- "Wasting Time", by Juliana Hatfield from There's Always Another Girl, 2011
- "Wasting Time", by Kid Rock from Devil Without a Cause, 2000
- "Wasting Time (Eternal Summer)", by Four Year Strong from Enemy of the World, 2010
- "Social Secs/Wasting Time", by The Stranglers from reissues of Black and White, 2016

== See also ==
- Wasted Time (disambiguation)
- Wasting My Time (disambiguation)
- "Waste Time", a song by the Fire Theft from their self-titled album
