= Rod Rondeaux =

American actor and stuntman

- Born: 1958 (age 67–68); Los Angeles, California, U.S.
- Occupations: Actor, stuntman

Rod Rondeaux is a Native American actor and stuntman. As an actor, his work includes the 2005 miniseries Into the West, Comanche Moon in 2008, the Cayuse character in the 2010 Kelly Reichardt film Meek's Cutoff (in which he co-starred with Bruce Greenwood, Shirley Henderson, Will Patton, Paul Dano, and Michelle Williams), and the lead role in the 2015 film, Mekko. His stunt work includes Reel Injun and Comanche Moon.

== Background ==
Rondeaux is a citizen of the Crow Tribe and is also of Cheyenne descent. He grew up on the Crow Indian Reservation in Montana. For years, Rondeaux was on the rodeo circuit as a horse rider, bull rider, steer wrestler and team roper. His entry into film stunt work was accidental. He was asked to be the double for actor Michael Greyeyes in the film Crazy Horse.

In 2001, he received the outstanding achievement in stunts award from the First Americans in the Arts.

Rondeaux won two awards for his role in the 2015 film, Mekko. He won the best actor award at the 40th Annual American Indian Film Festival and at the 2015 Red Nation Film Festival.

== Career ==
Rondeaux's earliest role was as Tall Bull in the 1996 film Crazy Horse, which was directed by John Irvin. For his role in Meek's Cutoff, as a mysterious and suddenly appearing Native American who joins a lost wagon train on the Oregon Trail, the language he spoke was his own native tongue.

Rondeaux had his first lead role in the 2015 film, ''Mekko. He played a man who served 19 years incarcerated for murder. Upon his release he discovers his family doesn’t want to have anything to do with him. He has to come to terms with his current situation. In addition, he also has to deal with a violent man (played by Zahn McClarnon). Director Sterlin Harjo actually cast Rondeaux the night before the shooting began. Having talked to the actor a couple of times, Harjo had a good feeling about him. With Rondeaux's background as a rodeo bull rider and Hollywood stuntman, he felt he had the right life experience for the role. Film critic Dennis Harvey of Variety complimented Rod Rondeaux's "soulful performance", and made comparisons the film to two classic films set on skid row, On the Bowery (1956) and The Exiles (1961).

Rondeaux played Raymond in Babak Jalali's 2018 film, Land. Also in 2018, he was in Susanna White's Woman Walks Ahead.

== Filmography (actor) ==
Television shows
Title	Episode #	Role	Director	Year	Notes #
Into the West	"Hell on Wheels"	Roman Nose	Michael W. Watkins	2005	
Comanche Moon	Episode #1.1	Slow Tree	Simon Wincer	2008	
Comanche Moon	Episode #1.2	Slow Tree	Simon Wincer	2008	
Tyrant	"The Other Brother"	Uthal	Kari Skogland	2015	
The English	"Path of the Dead"	Trooper Charlie White	Hugo Blick	2022	

Film
Title	Role	Director	Year	Notes #
Crazy Horse	Tall Bull	John Irvin	1996	made for television
The Missing	Hudlao / 'The One Who Laughs'	Ron Howard	2003	
Meek's Cutoff	The Indian	Kelly Reichardt	2010	
Mekko	Mekko	Sterlin Harjo	2015	
Hostiles	Derby	Scott Cooper	2017	
Woman Walks Ahead	Indian Robber	Susanna White	2017	
Land	Raymond Yellow Eagle	Babak Jalali	2018	
The Ballad of Buster Scruggs	Sioux Chief	Ethan Coen; Joel Coen	2018	segment "The Gal Who Got Rattled"
