= Podemski =

Podemski (feminine: Podemska) is a Polish surname. May refer to:

- Hieronim Podemski (born 1926), Polish politician
- Jennifer Podemski (born 1973), Canadian actress of Polish descent
- Krzysztof Podemski (born 1953), Polish sociologist
- Maciej Podemski (born 1939), Polish geologist
- Sarah Podemski (born 1983), Canadian actress of Polish descent
- Stanisław Podemski (1929–2011), Polish journalist
- Tamara Podemski (born 1977), Canadian actress of Polish descent
- Teresa Podemska-Abt (born 1952), Polish writer

== See also ==
- Podziemski
