= Willie Ruff =

American jazz musician and educator (1931–2023)

- Born: Willie Henry Ruff Jr. September 1, 1931; Sheffield, Alabama, U.S.
- Died: December 24, 2023 (aged 92) Killen, Alabama, U.S.
- Genres: Jazz
- Occupation: Musician
- Instrument(s): French horn, double bass

Willie Henry Ruff Jr. (September 1, 1931 – December 24, 2023) was an American jazz musician, specializing in the French horn and double bass, and a music scholar and educator, primarily as a Yale professor from 1971 to 2017.

== Personal life ==
Willie Henry Ruff Jr. was born in Sheffield, Alabama on September 1, 1931. He attended the Yale School of Music as an undergraduate (Bachelor of Music, 1953) and graduate student (Master of Music, 1954).

Ruff died in Killen, Alabama on December 24, 2023, at the age of 92.

== Professional career ==
=== Performing ===
Ruff played in the Mitchell-Ruff Duo with pianist Dwike Mitchell for over 50 years. Mitchell and Ruff first met in 1947, when they were teenaged servicemen stationed at the former Lockbourne Air Force Base in Ohio; Mitchell recruited Ruff to play bass with his unit band for an Air Force radio program. Mitchell and Ruff later played in Lionel Hampton's band but left in 1955 to form their own group. Together as the Mitchell-Ruff Duo, they played as "second act" to artists such as Louis Armstrong, Count Basie, Duke Ellington, and Dizzy Gillespie. From 1955 to 2011, the duo regularly performed and lectured in the United States, Asia, Africa, and Europe. The Mitchell-Ruff Duo was the first jazz band to play in the Soviet Union (1959) and in China (1981). Mitchell died in 2013.

Ruff was chosen by John Hammond to be the bass player for the recording sessions of Songs of Leonard Cohen, an album first released in 1967. During those sessions, he and Cohen laid down the bed tracks for most of the songs on the album.

Ruff was one of the founders of the W. C. Handy Music Festival in Florence, Alabama. The first festival was first held in 1982.

=== Teaching ===
Ruff was a faculty member at the Yale School of Music from 1971 until his retirement in 2017, teaching music history, ethnomusicology, and arranging. Ruff's classes at Yale, often with partner Dwike Mitchell, were free-flowing jam sessions: roller-coaster rides through the colors of American Improvisational Music. The duo could play in the style of most notable jazz artists and related styles. They had a large repertoire.

Ruff was founding Director of the Duke Ellington Fellowship Program at Yale, a community-based organization sponsoring artists mentoring and performing with Yale students and young musicians from the New Haven Public School System. The program was founded in 1972 as a "Conservatory Without Walls" to "'capture the essence and spirit' of the tradition of African-American music". By its 30th anniversary in 2002, the program had reached an estimated 180,000 students in New Haven schools.

From 1976 to 1977, he held a visiting appointment at Duke University, where he oversaw the jazz program and directed the Duke Jazz Ensemble.

Ruff was also on the faculty at UCLA and Dartmouth.

== Awards ==
Ruff was a 1994 inductee of the Alabama Jazz Hall of Fame.

In 2000, he received the Connecticut Governor's Arts Award for his work with the Duke Ellington Fellowship Program.

In May 2013, he was awarded the Sanford Medal. The Sanford Medal is the highest honor from Yale University's School of Music.

== Publications ==
Ruff was known for uncovering links between traditional black gospel music and unaccompanied psalm singing. Ruff's theory was that the Scottish Presbyterian practice of lining out – in which a precentor read or chanted a line of the psalm, which was then sung by the congregation – led to the call and response form of black gospel music. Ruff co-created the documentary "A Conjoining of Ancient Song", which focuses on a rapidly vanishing form of congregational singing that is shared by Scottish, African American, and Native American music. It received its world premiere screening at Yale in 2013. Ruff's work in this area was also a subject of Sterlin Harjo's 2014 documentary film, This May Be the Last Time.

Ruff wrote about classical composer Paul Hindemith, who was one of his teachers at Yale, and about his professional experiences with jazz composers Duke Ellington and Billy Strayhorn.

In 1992, Ruff published his memoir, titled A Call to Assembly: The Autobiography of a Musical Storyteller. The autobiography was hailed as "an unmitigated delight" and was awarded the ASCAP Deems Taylor Award.

== Discography ==
=== Solo ===
- The Smooth Side of Ruff (Columbia, 1968)
- Gregorian Chant, Plain Chant, and Spirituals Recorded in Saint Mark's Cathedral, Venice (Kepler Label, 1984; CD reissue 2003)

=== With the Mitchell-Ruff Duo ===
- The Mitchell-Ruff Duo (Epic, 1956)
- Campus Concert (Epic, 1957; 2002 Sony CD reissue combined with Brazilian Trip)
- Appearing Nightly (Roulette Records), 1958)
- Jazz Mission to Moscow (Roulette, 1959)
- The Sound of Music by Rodgers and Hammerstein (Roulette, 1960)
- The Mitchell-Ruff Duo plus Strings & Brass (Roulette, 1960)
- Jazz for Juniors (Roulette, 1960)
- Brazilian Trip (Epic Records, 1967; Forma Records 1966 Brazilian release as A Viagem with different track order and names; 2002 Sony CD reissue combined with Campus Concert)
- Dizzy Gillespie and the Mitchell Ruff Duo in Concert (Mainstream, 1971)
- Strayhorn: A Mitchell-Ruff Interpretation (Mainstream, 1972; 50th anniversary [of the duo] reissue, Kepler Label, CD MR-2421, 2004)
- Dizzy Gillespie Live With The Mitchell-Ruff Duo (Book-of-the-Month Club Records, 1982, 3-record-set; first record is same as the Mainstream 1971 record)
- Virtuoso Elegance in Jazz (Kepler Label, M-R 1234, 1984; CD reissue 2003)
- Dizzy Gillespie and the Mitchell-Ruff Duo: Enduring Magic (Blackhawk Records, 1986)
- Breaking the Silence - The Mitchell-Ruff Duo (Kepler Label, CD 2380, 2000)

=== With the Mitchell-Ruff Trio [including Charlie Smith, on drums] ===
- The Catbird Seat (Atlantic, 1961; reissued on CD combined with Les McCann, Much Les as 20 Special Fingers)
- After this Message (Atlantic, 1966)

=== With John Rodgers ===
- The Harmony of the World: A Realization for the Ear of Johannes Kepler's Astronomical Data from Harmonices Mundi 1619 (Kepler Label, 1979; CD reissue [date?])

=== As sideman ===
With Clifford Coulter

- Do It Now! (Impulse!, 1971)

With Miles Davis

- Miles Ahead (Columbia, 1957)
- Porgy and Bess (Columbia, 1958)
- Miles Davis & Gil Evans: The Complete Columbia Studio Recordings (Columbia/Legacy, 1996)

With Gil Evans

- Gil Evans & Ten (Prestige, 1957)

With Benny Golson

- Take a Number from 1 to 10 (Argo, 1961)

With Bobby Hutcherson

- Head On (Blue Note, 1971)

With Milt Jackson

- Big Bags (Riverside, 1962)
- For Someone I Love (Riverside, 1963)

With Quincy Jones

- Quincy Plays for Pussycats (Mercury, 1959-65 [1965])

With Lalo Schifrin

- Once a Thief and Other Themes (Verve, 1965)

With Jimmy Smith

- Hoochie Coochie Man (1966)

With Sonny Stitt

- Sonny Stitt & the Top Brass (Atlantic, 1962)

With Leonard Cohen

- Songs of Leonard Cohen (Columbia, 1967)

== Filmography ==
- Tony Williams in Africa (37 min., 1973)
- The Beginnings of Bebop (26 min., 1981)
- Shanghai Blues (1981)
- The Soul of St. Simons Island, Georgia (1981)
