= Dallas Goldtooth =

Native American actor and activist from Minnesota, U.S. (born 1983)

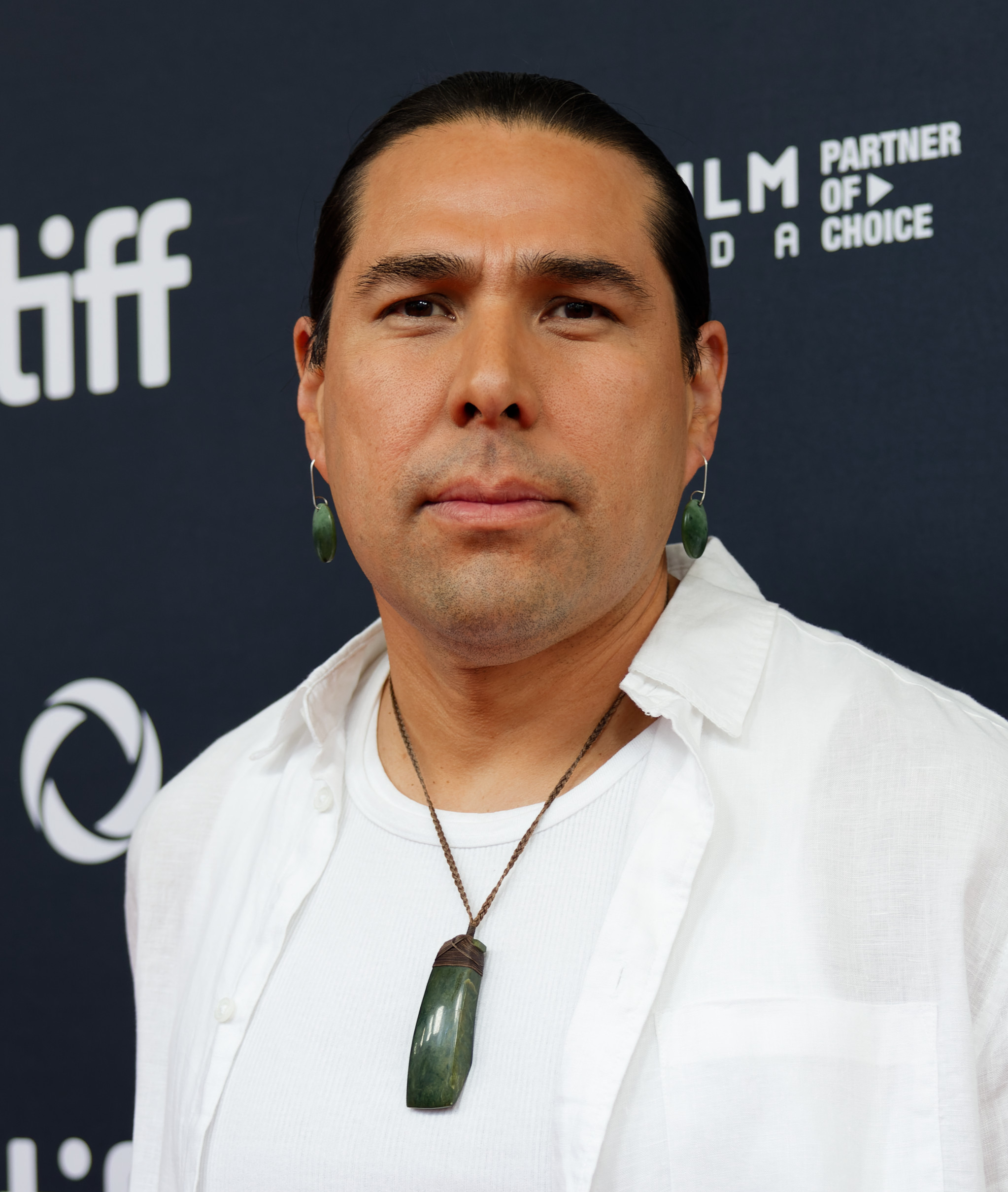
- Goldtooth at the 2024 Toronto International Film Festival for the premiere of Rez Ball
- Born: May 3, 1983 (age 43); Redwood Falls, Minnesota
- Citizenship: Shakopee Mdewakanton Sioux Community of Minnesota and American
- Occupations: comedian, writer, environmental activist, Dakota language–instructor
- Known for: Reservation Dogs

Dallas Goldtooth (Mdewakanton Dakota/Diné, born May 3, 1983) is a Native American environmental activist and performing artist. He is a cofounder of the 1491s, a Native American sketch comedy group, and a cast member of the television series Reservation Dogs. He is a Dakota language-instructor, writer, artist, and actor.

== Personal life ==
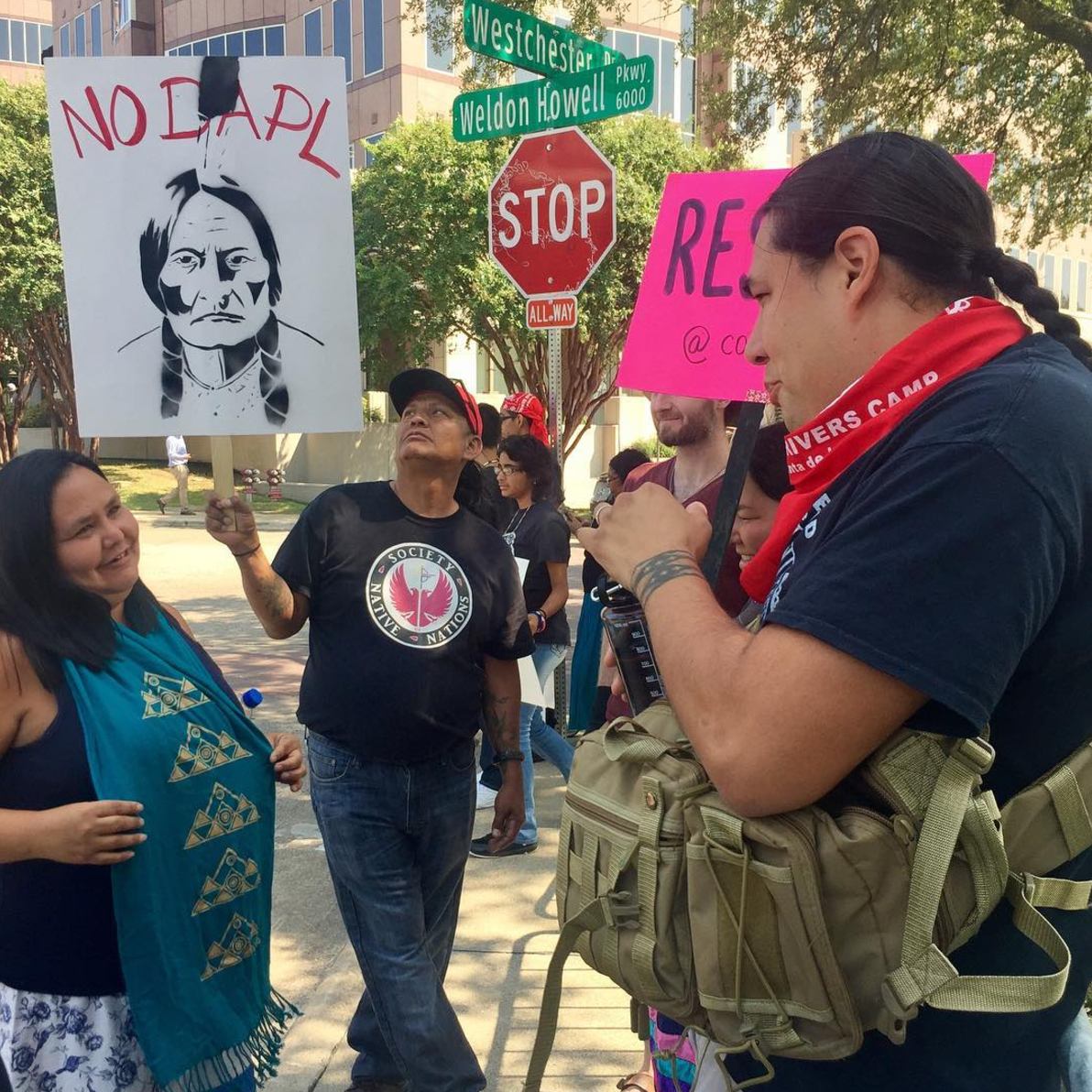
Goldtooth (right) at the StopETP Day of Action in Dallas in 2017

Dallas Goldtooth was born on May 3, 1983, in Redwood Falls, Minnesota. He is Dakota, Diné, and Hochunk. He is an enrolled citizen of the Lower Sioux Indian Community and a descendant of the Navajo people. His father is Tom B.K. Goldtooth (Diné). His mother is Hope Ann Two Hearts, née Neis. His stepfather was Galen Drapeau Sr., Ihanktonwan Dakota, a medicine man and Vietnam veteran.

Dallas grew up on the Yankton Sioux and Lower Sioux Indian Reservations, and spent summers in the Phillips neighborhood of South Minneapolis.

His older step-brother is Migizi Pensoneau.

== Activism and organizing ==
Goldtooth was the Keep It In the Ground campaign organizer for the Indigenous Environmental Network, an environmental justice organization led by his father. With IEN, Goldtooth led campaigns against the Keystone XL pipeline and the Dakota Access Pipeline. He was a water protector during the Dakota Access Pipeline protests at Standing Rock Indian Reservation.

== Writing and acting ==
Goldtooth was a writer for seasons 2 and 3 of Reservation Dogs.

Goldtooth's acting credits include Reservation Dogs, Rutherford Falls, Ghosts, Hailey's On It!, and Fallout.

== Filmography ==
Year	Title	Role	Notes
2012	Inventing the Indian	Co-host	Documentary
2019	Drunk History	John Trudell	Episode: "National Parks"
2021–2023	Reservation Dogs	William "Spirit" Knifeman	Recurring character; also writer
2022	Rutherford Falls	Nelson	6 episodes
2022	Ghosts	Bob	Episode: "The Tree"
2023–2024	Hailey's On It!	Chuck Banks, Additional Voices (voice)	4 episodes
2024	Echo	Shikoba / Emcee	Episode: "Lowak"
2024	Spirit Rangers	Toofus (voice)	Episode: "Summer's in Charge/Barracuda Brouhaha"
2024	Fallout	Charles Whiteknife	4 episodes
2024	Rez Ball	Henry Tso	
2024	Seeds	Wiz	
2025	Dexter: Resurrection	Dr. Abrams	Episode: "A Beating Heart..."
2025	The Last Frontier	Hutch	Main role
