= This May Be the Last Time =

2014 American documentary film

- Film poster
- Directed by: Sterlin Harjo
- Produced by: Sterlin Harjo; Christina D. King; Matt Leach
- Cinematography: Sterlin Harjo; Shane Brown; Matt Leach
- Edited by: Matt Leach
- Music by: Ryan Beveridge
- Distributed by: Sundance Channel
- Release date: January 19, 2014 (Sundance Film Festival)
- Running time: 90 minutes
- Country: United States
- Languages: English; Mvskoke

This May Be the Last Time is a 2014 American documentary film produced and directed by Sterlin Harjo. The film had its world premiere at 2014 Sundance Film Festival on January 19, 2014.

After its premiere at Sundance Film Festival, Sundance Channel acquired the distribution rights of the film. The film received its TV premiere in spring 2014.

== Synopsis ==
The film narrates that when in 1962 Pete Harjo, the director's grandfather, mysteriously went missing after his car crashed on a rural bridge in Sasakwa, Oklahoma, members of his Seminole and Muscogee community searched for him while singing songs of faith and hope that had been passed on for generations, with roots in both Scottish hymn lining and African American music. Harjo interviews family members and locals, as well as academic experts on the subject including the Yale professor Willie Ruff and Rogers State University's Hugh Foley.

== Reception ==
This May Be the Last Time received positive reviews from critics. Guy Lodge of Variety said in his review, "Filtering painstaking research on the evolution of Creek Nation hymns through a tragic narrative from Harjo's family history, the director's first nonfiction feature is artful and illuminating." Justin Lowe in his review for The Hollywood Reporter praised the film by saying, "The mystery of Pete Harjo’s disappearance turns out to be somewhat more prosaic, although Harjo plays out developments in the missing-person search skillfully enough to maintain interest, much in the storytelling tradition of his tribal elders."

Amanda Rock in her review for Slug magazine, wrote, "This film gives insight into a small community that supported each other through a difficult time, both physically and spiritually."
