= The Last Frontier (2025 TV series) =

2025 American thriller television series

- Promotional poster
- Genre: Drama; Thriller
- Created by: Jon Bokenkamp; Richard D'Ovidio
- Starring: Jason Clarke; Dominic Cooper; Haley Bennett; Simone Kessell; Tait Blum; Dallas Goldtooth; Alfre Woodard
- Music by: Ariel Marx
- Opening theme: Classical Gas by Mason Williams
- Country of origin: United States
- Original language: English
- No. of seasons: 1
- No. of episodes: 10

Production
- Executive producers: Jon Bokenkamp; Richard D'Ovidio; Laura Benson; Jason Clarke; Sam Hargrave; Glenn Kessler; Albert Kim
- Running time: 40–61 minutes
- Production companies: Pickpocket Entertainment; Bokenkamp & Benson; Apple Studios

Original release
- Network: Apple TV+
- Release: October 10, 2025
- Network: Apple TV
- Release: October 17 – December 5, 2025

The Last Frontier is an American thriller drama television series created by Jon Bokenkamp and Richard D'Ovidio. It premiered on Apple TV on October 10, 2025. In December 2025, the series was canceled after one season.

== Premise ==
A U.S. Marshal in the outskirts of Fairbanks, Alaska must protect his town while he investigates the plane crash that set free multiple fugitives, now on the loose.

== Cast and characters ==
=== Main ===
- Jason Clarke as Frank Remnick, the Supervisory Deputy U.S. Marshal for the District of Alaska and former pilot based in Fairbanks
- Dominic Cooper as Levi Taylor 'Havlock' Hartman, a CIA asset who escapes from custody
- Haley Bennett as Sidney Scofield, a CIA agent tasked with locating Havlock
- Simone Kessell as Sarah Remnick, a nurse and Frank's wife
- Tait Blum as Luke Remnick, Sarah and Frank's teenage son
- Dallas Goldtooth as Hutch, a Native American Deputy U.S. Marshal and Frank’s second in command
- Alfre Woodard as Jacqueline Bradford, a CIA Deputy Director and Scofield's superior

=== Recurring ===
- Anthony Skordi as Vincent Thiago, a former CIA operative
- John Slattery as a senior CIA official and Bradford's superior
- Martin Roach as Steven Cole, a Deputy U.S. Marshal from the Seattle Fugitive Task Force
- Rusty Schwimmer as Kitty Van Horn, an escaped prisoner
- Clifton Collins Jr. as Isaac 'Ike' Romero, a criminally insane escaped prisoner from Virginia, previously incarcerated in Wallens Ridge State Prison for murdering six people
- Johnny Knoxville as Spencer Todd 'S.T.' Covington, an escaped prisoner and white supremacist domestic terrorist from Clearmont, Wyoming, incarcerated for killing two U.S. Marshals during a standoff
- Prince Amponsah as Henry Sickler, an escaped prisoner and former accountant for organised crime who was mutilated by his former clients and agreed to become an informant in exchange for witness protection
- Marc-André Boulanger as Argento Volpe, an escaped prisoner and former mafia enforcer
- Kya Rose as Kira Moore, Luke Remnick's girlfriend
- Sarah Swire as Jenna Briggs, an Inspector with the CIA Office of the Inspector General
- Gray Powell as Mark Griffin, a CIA Associate Deputy Director of Intelligence who reports to Bradford
- Frank Fiola as Agent Loftquist
- Gus Birney as Vivian Pike, a con artist and identity thief serving an 18-month sentence

== Episodes ==
No.	Title	Directed by	Written by	Original release date
1	"Blue Skies"	Sam Hargrave	Jon Bokenkamp & Richard D'Ovidio	October 10, 2025
A JPATS Boeing 737 plane departs Eielson Air Force Base, but crashes outside of Fairbanks. Among the 18 prisoners who escape is Havlock, recently captured as part of a CIA black op in Khabarovsk who was being transported covertly. Supervisory Deputy U.S. Marshal Frank Remnick and his colleagues Donnie and Hutch investigate the crash site, but are forced to retreat via helicopter when prisoners attack them. Donnie later dies from his injuries. CIA official Bradford dispatches troubled agent Sidney Scofield to Fairbanks as part of a taskforce with the FBI to locate Havlock. She tells Remnick that she is Havlock’s former handler in the Atwater Protocol, a program to create false defectors who draw out enemies of the state to be terminated. However, before being captured, the agency was concerned his allegiance had switched. They confront a man believed to be Havlock, but after he shoots an FBI agent and is killed by a sled dog, Scofield confirms it isn’t him. It is revealed Deputy U.S. Marshal Granger, a supposed survivor of the crash hospitalised in Fairbanks, is Havlock. He escapes from the hospital, kidnaps Remnick’s wife Sarah and cuts internet and cell service to the area. Over a radio broadcast, Havlock tells Remnick his plans will change the world.
2	"Winds of Change"	John Curran	Melissa Glenn	October 10, 2025
Havlock warns Bradford and Scofield he has set a 72 hour rolling authentication dead man's switch, and if he is killed the contents of Archive 6, a classified file detailing Atwater Protocol targets, will be released. The taskforce is joined by marshals from Seattle led by Steven Cole. Bradford’s superior tells her Scofield is suspected by the OIG of abetting Havlock, and gives her two days to bring them both in. Remnick’s son Luke, and his girlfriend Kira, find injured prisoner Issac Romero near the remote family cabin, but become trapped when their car gets stuck. Henry Sickler, an escaped underworld accountant, turns himself in to the authorities due to having previously been promised witness protection. Havlock demands he be handed over in exchange for Sarah, but it is a ruse to draw police away from an NTSB transport, allowing Havlock to steal the plane's flight recorder. Sarah stabs Havlock in a failed escape attempt. In a flashback, Scofield tries to recruit Havlock, who was previously a white hat hacker and lecturer on resiliency.
3	"Country as F*ck"	Sam Hargrave	Akela Cooper	October 17, 2025
Locals find Caleb Barker, a child who fled after being taken hostage with his father by escaped prisoner S.T. Covington. Havlock is captured alongside Caleb’s father Sam by Covington and fellow prisoners Argento Volpe and Edward Porter, who take a nearby tourist transport hostage. Havlock later disarms them. Romero takes Luke and Kira prisoner. Sarah is found alive, and says Havlock printed documents in their house. It is revealed the Remnicks recently lost their daughter, Ruby. Scofield tells her Havlock likely plans to manipulate Remnick. Havlock threatens a hostage, forcing Scofield to disclose her CIA login, which he uses to contact Armen Zhdanko, a Russian suspected of stealing Archive 6. Scofield tells Remnick the CIA suspect her of helping Havlock steal classified intel and aiding his escape, and that she intends to clear her name for the sake of her father, who founded the Atwater Protocol. The taskforce intercepts the tourist transport. Havlock, undeterred, tells Remnick he knows about the secret in his basement, and jumps from the transport as it hangs over a ravine. Remnick reluctantly agrees to work with Scofield, and provides her the SIM card from the printer. In a flashback, Scofield and Havlock become romantically involved during a mission in Prague.
4	"American Dream"	John Curran	Kelli Johnson	October 24, 2025
Two female prisoners, Vivian and Kitty, are traveling together and meet an Alaska state trooper, Ruth Reed. Kitty murders the trooper. A connection was found between the women and Havlock. At a diner, Kitty and Vivian steal a car and escape from a police officer. The women are revealed to be searching for a pilot to fly them out of Alaska. Vivian is captured by the marshals. Scofield and Remnick interrogate Vivian. Kitty is captured and seriously ill. Kitty almost stabs Remnick but Scofield kills her. Scofield is revealed to be Havlock’s wife. The archive of CIA secrets is in transit from Russia to Alaska. Havlock is revealed to be alive and is posing as a part of the search team for him. Sarah and Todd, the hospital therapist, are heading to get Luke from the cabin. Sarah reveals to Todd that she hasn’t given Remnick a drive Havlock asked her to deliver to Remnick. Sarah find Luke and Kira missing from the cabin and the dead state trooper. Romero is forcing Luke to drive him and Kira away from the cabin. Luke suddenly unbuckles Romero’s seat belt and crashes the SUV. All three survive the car crash. Luke grabs the gun and leads Romero away from Kira who runs toward the main road. During several flashbacks, Scofield reveals the complicated nature of her romantic relationship with Havlock.
5	"Arnaq"	John Curran	Glenn Kessler	October 31, 2025
6	"The Devil Wears a Suit and Tie"	Jessica Lowrey	Melissa Glenn	November 7, 2025
7	"Change of Time"	Jessica Lowrey	Albert Kim	November 14, 2025
8	"L’air Perdu"	John Curran	Ryan Cruise	November 21, 2025
9	"Converge"	Dennie Gordon	Albert Kim	November 26, 2025
10	"Everything Trying"	Dennie Gordon	Jon Bokenkamp & Richard D'Ovidio	December 5, 2025

== Production ==
It was announced in February 2023 that Apple TV+ had given a straight to series order for the project, with Jason Clarke set to star. In February 2024, Dominic Cooper, Haley Bennett, Simone Kessell, Tait Blum, Dallas Goldtooth and Alfre Woodard were added to the cast. The series is executive produced by Jon Bokenkamp and Richard D’Ovidio, alongside Clarke, Laura Benson, Glenn Kessler, Albert Kim and Sam Hargrave. Filming began on February 5, 2024 in Montreal, wrapping in October.

On December 19, 2025, Apple TV canceled the series after one season.

== Release ==
The series made its global debut on Apple TV+ with the first two episodes on Friday, October 10, 2025 followed by new episodes every Friday through December 5.

== Reception ==
On the review aggregator website Rotten Tomatoes, the series holds an approval rating of 46% based on 24 reviews. The website's critics consensus reads, "Squandering a crackerjack premise, The Last Frontier stretches on for too long to sustain momentum while also leaving its potential largely unexplored." Metacritic gave a score of 53 out of 100 based on 10 critics, indicating "mixed or average" reviews.
