= Spirit Rangers =

Educational computer-animated television series

- Season 1 promotional poster; from left to right: Eddy, Kodi and Summer.
- Created by: Karissa Valencia
- Directed by: Dominique Monféry; Dorothée Robert
- Voices of: Wačíŋyeya Iwáš'aka Yracheta; Isis Celilo Rogers; Talon Proc Alford; Kimberly Norris Guerrero; John Timothy; Shaun Taylor-Corbett; Cree Summer
- Theme music composer: Raye Zaragoza; Ehren Kee Natay
- Composer: Jordan Kamalu
- Countries of origin: United States; Italy; France
- Original language: English
- No. of seasons: 3
- No. of episodes: 39 (58 segments)

Production
- Executive producers: Karissa Valencia; Chris Nee
- Producer: PeeDee Shindell
- Running time: 23 minutes (11 minutes per segment)
- Production companies: Laughing Wild; Superprod Studio; Netflix Animation Studios

Original release
- Network: Netflix
- Release: October 10, 2022 – April 8, 2024

Spirit Rangers is an animated preschool television series created by Karissa Valencia, a member of the Santa Ynez Band of the Chumash Nation. Co-produced by Netflix Animation Studios, Laughing Wild and Superprod Studio, the series was released on Netflix on October 10, 2022, before Indigenous Peoples' Day. On January 18, 2023, it was announced that the series was renewed for a second season, which premiered on May 8. On June 15 the same year, it was announced the series was renewed for a third and final season which premiered on April 8, 2024.

== Premise ==
The show centers on Chumash and Cowlitz siblings Kodi, Summer and Eddy Skycedar, who wield magical necklaces that enable them to enter a magical spirit dimension in their national park. All three can assume animal forms: Kodi a grizzly bear, Summer a red-tailed hawk, and Eddy a turtle.

At the end of the second season, the Skycedars' necklaces are stolen by the Trickster Trio, a group of antagonistic animals. An otter spirit creates new necklaces that enable the Skycedars to transform into aquatic animals: Kodi a stingray, Summer an octopus, and Eddy an orca. The Skycedars later recover the original necklaces, which fuse with the second set and enable them to assume both forms at will.

The third season reveals that the Skycedars' mother and father were previously Spirit Rangers, but lost their magic after transferring it to them. The two later regain their magic, enabling them to reassume their respective spirit forms: a bear and an anthropomorphic tree.

== Voice cast ==
=== Main ===
- Wačíŋyeya Iwáš'aka Yracheta as Kodi Skycedar
- Isis Celilo Rogers as Summer Skycedar
- Talon Proc Alford as Eddy Skycedar
- Kimberly Norris Guerrero as Mom
- John Timothy as Dad
- Shaun Taylor-Corbett as Coyote
- Cree Summer as Lizard

=== Villains ===
- Adrianne Chalepah as Raven
- Bobby Wilson as Rabbit, Trouble, and Snow Bunnies
- Deanna MAD as Raccoon
- Jackie Keliiaa as Bubble

=== Recurring ===
- Wes Studi as Sunny
- Tantoo Cardinal as Moon
- Tonantzin Carmelo as Buffalo and Orchids
- Litefoot as Qamash
- Brooke Simpson as Spider
- G. K. Bowes as Mud and Smelly
- Nyla Rose as Lawetlat'la
- Jaylan Evans as Condor and Gem
- Román Zaragoza as Miy
- Jake Hart as Sticks, Rocky Rock, and Boar Spirit
- Devery Jacobs as Wind Eagle
- Mahpiya Waste Win Dilabaugh as Meow Meow
- Wicahpi Etan U Win Dilabaugh as Mittens

=== Minor ===
- Cree Summer as DeeDee

=== Guest ===
- Ben Gonzales as Dad Thunderbird and Snowy Mountain
- Siouxsaya Hohenstein as Sky
- Sheri Foster as Tuk'e'm, Grandma Rattlesnake, and Cat Rescue Volunteer
- Jana Schmieding as Vulture, Detzy, Mom Goose, and Ruby
- Michelle Bardach as Corn Spirit and Colocolo Opossum
- Monique Candelaria as Mom Thunderbird
- Q'orianka Kilcher as 'Ayatulutul
- Burgandi Trejo Phoenix as Squash Spirit
- Robbie Daymond as Mouse and Bat
- Gregory Norman Cruz as Great Gecko
- Jeannie Tirado as Cindy
- Kimberly Brooks as Mindy
- Javier Prusky as Woodpecker
- Erin Campbell as Snake Spirit
- ShanDien LaRance as Eagle Dancer
- Ty Defoe as Flower Spirit
- Ogie Banks as Brad
- Lucas Grabeel as Chad
- Krizia Bajos as Shad
- Princess Daazhraii Johnson as Dekehone
- Jayli Wolf as Hedgehog
- Aaron Yazzie as Himself
- Jenna Clause as Blade
- Gary Batton as Himself
- Glen Gould as Deneege
- Sky Lakota-Lynch as Stink Bug
- Debora Iyall as Great Sa'mn Spirit
- William Belleau as Adrian Lopez and Hummingbird
- Eugene Brave Rock as Crane
- Wawikiya Cik’ala Black Elk as JJ
- Kenny Ramos as Takak
- Jalen Gomez as Ribbit Junior
- Taboo as Waqaq
- Temuera Morrison as Ngārara
- Moira Cleaves as Bianca
- Talus Meraz as Spike
- Sarah Podemski as Otter Woman
- Moses Goods as Keali'ikau
- Tamara Podemski as Sukupin
- Michael Greyeyes as 'Eleyewun
- Lane Factor as Tanegwa
- Kyla Garcia as Łmłaná
- Gregory Zaragoza as Cholhkun
- Crystle Lightning as Twigs
- Dallas Goldtooth as Toofus
- Joy Harjo as Great Oak Tree

== Episodes ==
=== Series overview ===
Series overview
| Season | Segments | Episodes | Originally released |
|---|---|---|---|
| 1 | 20 | 10 | October 10, 2022 |
| 2 | 19 | 10 | May 8, 2023 |
| 3 | 19 | 19 | April 8, 2024 |

=== Season 1 (2022) ===
| No. overall | No. in season | Title | Directed by | Written by | Storyboarded by | Original release date |
|---|---|---|---|---|---|---|
| 1 | 1 | "Thunder Mountain" | Dominique Monféry | Karissa Valencia | Dominique Monféry | October 10, 2022 |
| 1 | 1 | "Snoozing Sun" | Dominique Monféry | Karissa Valencia | Dominique Monféry | October 10, 2022 |
| 2 | 2 | "The Cuzzin" | Dominique Monféry | Lucas Brown Eyes | Mohammed Labidi | October 10, 2022 |
| 2 | 2 | "Totally Eclipsed" | Dominique Monféry | Story by : Karissa Valencia; Teleplay by : Jason Marcus | Benoit Phelippeau | October 10, 2022 |
| 3 | 3 | "Caterpillar Camp" | Dominique Monféry | Kelly Lynne D'Angelo and Kent Redeker | Nicolas Reynaud | February 7, 2023 |
| 3 | 3 | "Coyote's Treasury Treasure" | Dominique Monféry | Story by : Joey Clift; Teleplay by : Shelley Dennis | Bich Pham | February 7, 2023 |
| 4 | 4 | "Rumble Mountain Rumble" | Dominique Monféry | Joey Clift | Franck Bonnet | October 10, 2022 |
| 4 | 4 | "Eagle Eye View" | Dominique Monféry | Jason Marcus | Mohammed Labidi | October 10, 2022 |
| 5 | 5 | "Trout Trouble" | Dominique Monféry | Joey Clift | Gaston Jaunet | October 10, 2022 |
| 5 | 5 | "Sweet Dreams" | Dominique Monféry | Shelley Dennis | Bernard Portier | October 10, 2022 |
| 6 | 6 | "The Three Sisters" | Dominique Monféry | Kelly Lynne D'Angelo | Benoit Phelippeau | October 10, 2022 |
| 6 | 6 | "The Lacrosse Boss" | Dominique Monféry | Kelly Lynne D'Angelo | Dominique Monféry | October 10, 2022 |
| 7 | 7 | "Distracted by the Gecko" | Dominique Monféry | Kelly Lynne D'Angelo | Bernard Portier | October 13, 2022 |
| 7 | 7 | "Belly of the Beast" | Dominique Monféry | Kent Redeker | Bernard Portier | October 13, 2022 |
| 8 | 8 | "Woe Is Wolf" | Dominique Monféry | Karissa Valencia | Sébastien Lurcel | October 10, 2022 |
| 8 | 8 | "The Big Bad Buffalo" | Dorothée Robert | Shelley Dennis | Dorothée Robert | October 10, 2022 |
| 9 | 9 | "Broken Tree-tys" | Dominique Monféry | Joey Clift | Gaston Jaunet | November 1, 2022 |
| 9 | 9 | "Hoop Dance Off" | Dominique Monféry | Joey Clift | Gaston Jaunet | November 1, 2022 |
| 10 | 10 | "Not Your Opossum Mascot" | Dominique Monféry | Joey Clift | Bernard Portier | October 10, 2022 |
| 10 | 10 | "Prickly Pride" | Dominique Monféry | Carlee Malemute | Nicolas Reynaud | October 10, 2022 |

=== Season 2 (2023) ===
| No. overall | No. in season | Title | Directed by | Written by | Storyboarded by | Original release date |
|---|---|---|---|---|---|---|
| 11 | 1 | "Tricksters Steal the Sun" | Dorothée Robert | Joey Clift | Nicholas Reynard | May 8, 2023 |
| 11 | 1 | "Spirit Kittens" | Dorothée Robert | Joey Clift | Roland Sé | May 8, 2023 |
| 12 | 2 | "River Ruckus" | Dominique Monféry | Joey Clift | Gaston Jaunet | May 8, 2023 |
| 12 | 2 | "Sailing Stones" | Dorothée Robert | Lucas Brown Eyes | Dorothée Robert | May 8, 2023 |
| 13 | 3 | "Spirit Rangers Blast Off!" | Dorothée Robert | Carlee Malemute | Abdel Raouf Zaidi | May 8, 2023 |
| 13 | 3 | "Lizard's Lost and Found" | Dorothée Robert | Shelley Dennis | Sophie Krettly | May 8, 2023 |
| 14 | 4 | "Chief of the Day" | Dorothée Robert | Story by : Joey Clift; Teleplay by : Kent Redeker | Damien Barrau | May 8, 2023 |
| 14 | 4 | "Vulture Rock" | Dorothée Robert | Lizzie Prestel | Brice Magnier | May 8, 2023 |
| 15 | 5 | "Moose on the Loose" | Dorothée Robert | Carlee Malemute | Nicolas Reynaud | April 18, 2023 |
| 15 | 5 | "The Big Stink" | Dorothée Robert | Story by : Joey Clift; Teleplay by : Kris Crenwelge | Marianne Lebel | April 18, 2023 |
| 16 | 6 | "Slow and Steady Eddy" | Dorothée Robert | Carlee Malemute | Sophie Krettly | October 11, 2025 |
| 16 | 6 | "Salmon Where Are You?" | Dorothée Robert | Joey Clift | Christophe Ollivier | October 11, 2025 |
| 17 | 7 | "Deuces, Gooses" | Dorothée Robert | Carlee Malemute | Bernard Portier | May 8, 2023 |
| 17 | 7 | "Frog Concert Chaos" | Dorothée Robert | Joey Clift | Sophie Krettly | May 8, 2023 |
| 18 | 8 | "A Tale of Tails" | Dorothée Robert | Carlee Malemute | Bernard Portier | May 13, 2023 |
| 18 | 8 | "Say It Don't Spray It" | Dorothée Robert | Shelley Dennis | Marianne Lebel | May 13, 2023 |
| 19 | 9 | "Rattle Trap" | Dorothée Robert | Lizzie Prestel | Damien Barrau | May 8, 2023 |
| 19 | 9 | "Home Squawk Home" | Dorothée Robert | Karissa Valencia | Nicolas Reynaud | May 8, 2023 |
| 20 | 10 | "Water Protectors" | Dorothée Robert | Karissa Valencia | Damien Barrau and Dorothée Robert | April 10, 2025 |

=== Season 3 (2024) ===
| No. overall | No. in season | Title | Directed by | Written by | Storyboarded by | Original release date |
|---|---|---|---|---|---|---|
| 21 | 1 | "Spirit Park Secrets" | Dominique Etchecopar | Karissa Valencia | Nicolas Reynaud | April 8, 2024 |
| 22 | 2 | "Crabs in a Bucket" | Dominique Etchecopar | Joey Clift | Bernard Portier | July 9, 2025 |
| 23 | 3 | "Surfing Shark" | Dominique Etchecopar | Kris Crenwelge | Benoit Phelippeau | April 12, 2024 |
| 24 | 4 | "Kodi's Old Shoes" | Ange La Torre | Joey Clift | Jérémie Bouet | April 8, 2024 |
| 25 | 5 | "Finding True North" | Dominique Etchecopar | Kris Crenwelge | Céline Pottier | April 8, 2024 |
| 26 | 6 | "The Great Swordfish" | Dominique Etchecopar | Story by : Karissa Valencia; Teleplay by : Lucas Mills | Basile Zumer | April 8, 2024 |
| 27 | 7 | "Digging Deeper" | Dominique Etchecopar | JhonTom Knight | Céline Pottier | April 8, 2024 |
| 28 | 8 | "Stuck On You" | Dominique Etchecopar | Kris Crenwelge | Basile Zumer | New Videos Aired date on Thursday, October 23rd at 4:00 PM on Netflix Jr |
| 29 | 9 | "Xutash Harvest" | Dominique Etchecopar | Joey Clift | Nicolette Ray | April 8, 2024 |
| 30 | 10 | "Tiny But Mighty" | Dominique Etchecopar | Blake Pickens | Nicolas Reynaud | July 5, 2024 |
| 31 | 11 | "Potlatch Problem" | Dominique Etchecopar | Joey Clift | Frederic Dybowski | April 8, 2024 |
| 32 | 12 | "Finding Family" | Dominique Etchecopar | Kris Crenwelge | Bernard Portier | April 8, 2024 |
| 33 | 13 | "Summer's in Charge" | Dominique Etchecopar | Joey Clift | Jérémie Bouet | November 7, 2024 |
| 34 | 14 | "Barracuda Brouhaha" | Dominique Etchecopar | Kris Crenwelge | Nicolette Ray | April 8, 2024 |
| 35 | 15 | "Wild Flowers" | Dominique Etchecopar | Story by : Karissa Valencia; Teleplay by : Norma P. Sepulueda | Nicolas Reynaud | April 8, 2024 |
| 36 | 16 | "Sage Advice" | Dominique Etchecopar | Story by : Joey Clift; Teleplay by : Blake Pickens | Céline Pottier | April 8, 2024 |
| 37 | 17 | "Facing Fears" | Dominique Etchecopar | JhonTom Knight | Basile Zumer | April 8, 2024 |
| 38 | 18 | "The Great Oak Tree" | Dorothée Robert | Joy Harjo and Karissa Valencia | Dorothée Robert | October 23, 2025 |
| 39 | 19 | "Blizzards and Blankets" | Dominique Etchecopar and Ange La Torre | Kris Crenwelge and Joey Clift | Nicolas Reynaud and Basile Zumer | April 8, 2024 |

== Production ==
The series was announced in October 2020 alongside Ridley Jones and Dino Daycare, with the latter's production being canceled in April 2022.

Production of the series featured a writer's room that was staffed entirely by Indigenous Americans. Valencia also consulted Chumash and Cowlitz tribes around content. Superprod Animation provided the animation services, alongside Netflix Animation Studios and Laughing Wild.

== Release ==
Spirit Rangers premiered on October 10, 2022, globally on Netflix. A trailer was released on September 23.

== Accolades ==
| Year | Award | Category | Nominee | Result | Ref. |
|---|---|---|---|---|---|
| 2023 | Children's and Family Emmy Awards | Outstanding Preschool Animated Series | | Nominated | |
| 2023 | Children's and Family Emmy Awards | Outstanding Directing for a Preschool Animated Program | Dorothée Robert | Nominated | |
| 2023 | Children's and Family Emmy Awards | Outstanding Casting for an Animated Program | Rene Hayes, Elise Buedel and Allyson Bosch | Nominated | |
| 2023 | Children's and Family Emmy Awards | Outstanding Voice Directing for an Animated Series | Allyson Bosch | Nominated | |
| 2023 | Children's and Family Emmy Awards | Outstanding Voice Performance in a Preschool Animated Program | Cree Summer | Nominated | |
| 2023 | Children's and Family Emmy Awards | Outstanding Younger Voice Performer in an Animated or Preschool Animated Program | Talon Proc Alford | Nominated | |
| 2023 | Children's and Family Emmy Awards | Outstanding Younger Voice Performer in an Animated or Preschool Animated Program | Isis Celilo Rogers | Nominated | |
