= Rez Ball =

2024 American sports drama film

- Release poster
- Directed by: Sydney Freeland
- Screenplay by: Sydney Freeland; Sterlin Harjo
- Based on: Canyon Dreams by Michael Powell
- Produced by: LeBron James; Maurício Mota; Katie Elmore Mota; Spencer Beighley; Jamal Henderson; Nancy Utley
- Starring: Kauchani Bratt; Jessica Matten; Julia Jones; Amber Midthunder; Kiowa Gordon
- Cinematography: Kira Kelly
- Edited by: Jessica Baclesse
- Music by: Dan Deacon
- Production companies: SpringHill Company; Wise Entertainment; Chernin Entertainment; Lake Ellyn Entertainment
- Distributed by: Netflix
- Release dates: September 8, 2024 (TIFF); September 27, 2024 (United States)
- Running time: 111 minutes
- Country: United States
- Language: English

Rez Ball is a 2024 American sports drama film directed by Sydney Freeland, who co-wrote the screenplay with Sterlin Harjo, based on the nonfiction sports novel Canyon Dreams: A Basketball Season on the Navajo Nation, by The New York Times journalist Michael Powell. LeBron James served as one of the producers. The film features an ensemble cast, including Kauchani Bratt, Jessica Matten, Julia Jones, Amber Midthunder, and Kiowa Gordon.

The Chuska Warriors, a Native American high school basketball team from Chuska, New Mexico, is competing for the state championship title while contending with losing their star player.

The film premiered at the Toronto International Film Festival on September 8, 2024, and was released on Netflix on September 27, 2024.

== Plot ==
For the first time in years, the Chuska Warriors, a Native American high school basketball team from the [fictional] town of Chuska, New Mexico, in the Navajo Nation, starts the season with high hopes of competing for the state championship title. The team's former captain, Naat'áanii Jackson, after taking his junior school year off due to the death of his mother and sister, has returned. Naat'áanii's friend Jimmy Holiday covered the position in his absence. Coach Heather Hobbs, who has returned to the reservation after a career in the WNBA, must see to the team's success this season, or face losing her job.

Following a decisive victory for the Chuska warriors at the first game of the season, a reporter mentions Naat'áanii's mother and sister's deaths to him, which causes him to have dark thoughts. When Naat'áanii fails to attend a pivotal game against major rivals the Santa Fe Coyotes, the team loses by a landslide. Afterwards, the Warriors are informed of Naat'áanii's death by suicide.

Jimmy takes Naat'áanii's death particularly hard, being his lifelong close friend. The previous night, Naat'áanii had attempted to subtly confide in Jimmy his suicidal thoughts, but had not been understood by him. His mother Gloria is little comfort to him, chalking his death up to being the Natives' fate to lose.

Heather recruits her high school basketball coach Benny Begay to assist her, as he had coached Gloria and her to win the state championship in their day. Gloria goes to Naat'áanii's father Ronald when she sees he needs a cleaner at his garage. When she explains she can only work on the Navajo Nation due to multiple DUIs, he gives her the job, suggesting she come along to AA meetings.

Coach Hobbs introduces Benny to the team as her assistant coach, underlining his instrumentality in their achievement of two state championships in her time. He insists they go back to more traditional ways, so introduces smudging to start. They are put in a scrimmage with Chuska's girls team, who they play a running game with; the boys lose.

The team continues having difficulties with coming together, losing nine games in a row. There is talk of people wanting Coach Hobbs off the team. Gloria showers more negativity on Jimmy, insisting the higher one rises, the harder they fall. She tells him she does not go to the matches to not see him lose.

The team is taken by bus for a team-building exercise. They are tasked with working together to recover a flock of sheep. At first, although they find them, working individually does not work. So, Jimmy devises a plan, they split into two organized groups and shepherd the sheep into their pen.

Jimmy is inspired by the team-building exercise, and suggests communicating their plays in Navajo. He first gets Krista, his manager at work, to teach him basic vocabulary in the language, as he never learned it. The team studies their newly-labeled plays on the bus to the next game, and they start a winning streak. After a 14-game streak, Chuska loses the district title, but still goes on to the state championship.

Chuska is able to win their first three matches, making it to the final against the undefeated Santa Fe. They soon learn their rivals have learned Navajo, so they cannot use the language to their advantage. The Warriors catch their breath, then keep right on top of the Coyotes until the last few minutes. Santa Fe's team captain fouls Jimmy on a last second shot. Jimmy is given three free throws, hitting two of them to win the championship.

Jimmy gets Krista as well as a dozen college offers. Coach Hobbs also gets a few job offers, but decides to stay on one more year. Gloria finally comes clean, facing up to her past ways and finally encourages her son.

== Cast ==
- Hunter Redhorse Arthur (Diné) as Kobe Nezv
- Ryan Begay (Diné) as Ronald Jackson
- Kauchani Bratt (Tāp Pīlam Coahuiltecan/Quechua) as Jimmy Holiday
- Damian Henry Castellane (Puyallup) as Ruckus Largo
- Dallas Goldtooth (Mdewakanton Dakota/Diné) as Henry Tso
- Kusem Goodwind (Coeur d’Alene/Nez Perce) as Naat'áanii Jackson
- Kiowa Gordon (Hualapai) as Antonio Freeman
- Sam Griesel as Mason Troy
- Avery Hale (Mandan/Hidatsa/San Carlos Apache/San Felipe Pueblo) as Miles Martinez
- Jojo Jackson (Diné) as Warlance Yazzie
- Julia Jones as Gloria Holiday
- Cody Lightning (Samson Cree Nation) as Micah Tso
- Jessica Matten (Red River Métis/Saulteaux–Cree) as Heather Hobbs
- Amber Midthunder (Fort Peck Nakoda/Lakota/Dakota) as Dezbah Weaver
- Zoey Reyes as Krista
- Jaren K. Robledo (Diné) as Levi Silversmith
- Devin Sampson-Craig (Pyramid Lake Paiute) as Bryson Badonie
- River Rayne Thomas (Saulteaux) as Tyson Yazzie
- Ernest Tsosie III (Diné) as Benny Begay
- Henry Wilson Jr. (Diné) as Leland Tom

== Production ==
Sydney Freeland was announced as director of the project for Netflix in August 2021. Freeland and Sterlin Harjo had written the script inspired by Michael Powell's nonfiction book Canyon Dreams: A Basketball Season on the Navajo Nation (2019). The project was produced by Wise Entertainment, with Maurício and Katie Mota involved. That same month, LeBron James and Maverick Carter were announced to have joined the project as producers via The SpringHill Company, with Spencer Beighley and Jamal Henderson executive producers for SpringHill. Former Searchlight chair Nancy Utley also produced via her Lake Ellyn Entertainment production house.

=== Filming ===
In April 2023, Deadline Hollywood reported that principal photography was underway and taking place in New Mexico with filming on the Navajo Nation, with the permission and support of the local sovereign tribal nations.

== Release ==
Rez Ball premiered at the 2024 Toronto International Film Festival on September 8, 2024, and was released on Netflix on September 27, 2024.

== Reception ==
On the review aggregator website Rotten Tomatoes, 94% of 32 critics' reviews are positive, with an average rating of 7.0/10. The website's consensus reads: "Putting an Indigenous spin on the classic sports movie formula, Rez Ball dominates the court with its authentic feel for culture and setting." Metacritic, which uses a weighted average, assigned the film a score of 69 out of 100, based on 10 critics, indicating "generally favorable" reviews.

== See also ==
- List of basketball films
