= Jessica Matten =

Canadian actress (born 1985)

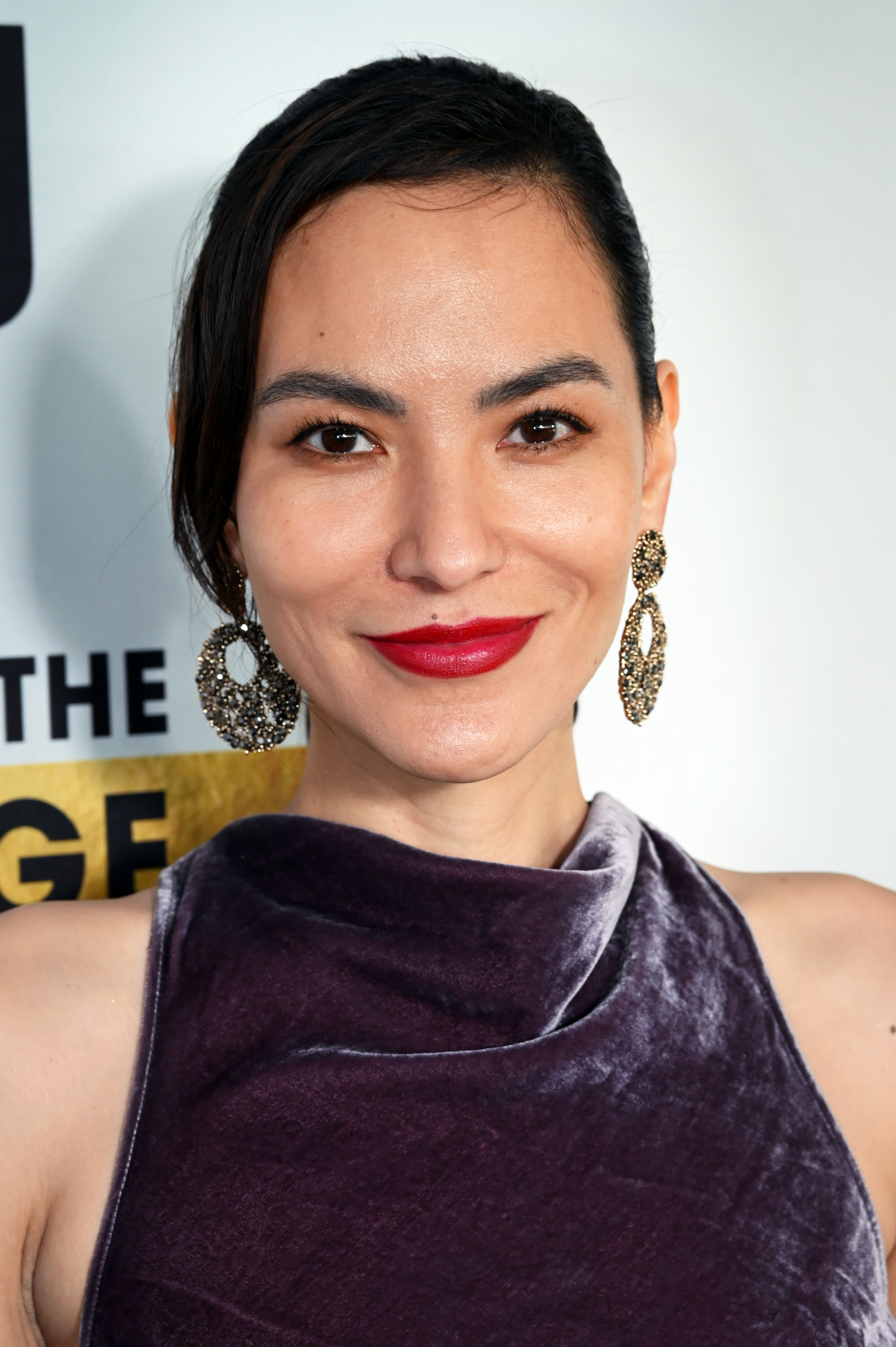
- Matten in 2026
- Born: November 30, 1985 (age 40) (Note: However, another source states November 2, 1985.); Edmonton, Alberta, Canada
- Education: University of Alberta (BS)
- Occupations: Actress; producer
- Years active: 2010–present
- Height: 5 ft 10 in (1.78 m) (Note: Also reported as 5 ft 9 in (1.75 m).)

Jessica Matten (born November 30, 1985) is a Canadian actress.

== Early life, family, and education ==
Matten was born in Edmonton, Alberta. She has British-Chinese ancestry through her father, as well as Red River Métis/Saulteaux–Cree heritage from her mother, Therese Ducharme, an activist, performer and former model. Matten is a descendant of Cuthbert Grant, the first rebel Métis leader; he was known for the Canadian Battle of Seven Oaks.

From the age of six, she assisted with her mother's First Nations modelling agency, Mystique Models, around Canada.

Matten graduated from the University of Alberta with a Bachelor of Science degree in human ecology with a minor in marketing. She studied acting at Shoreline Studios Vancouver Acting School and modelling at Central Saint Martins and London College of Fashion.

== Career ==
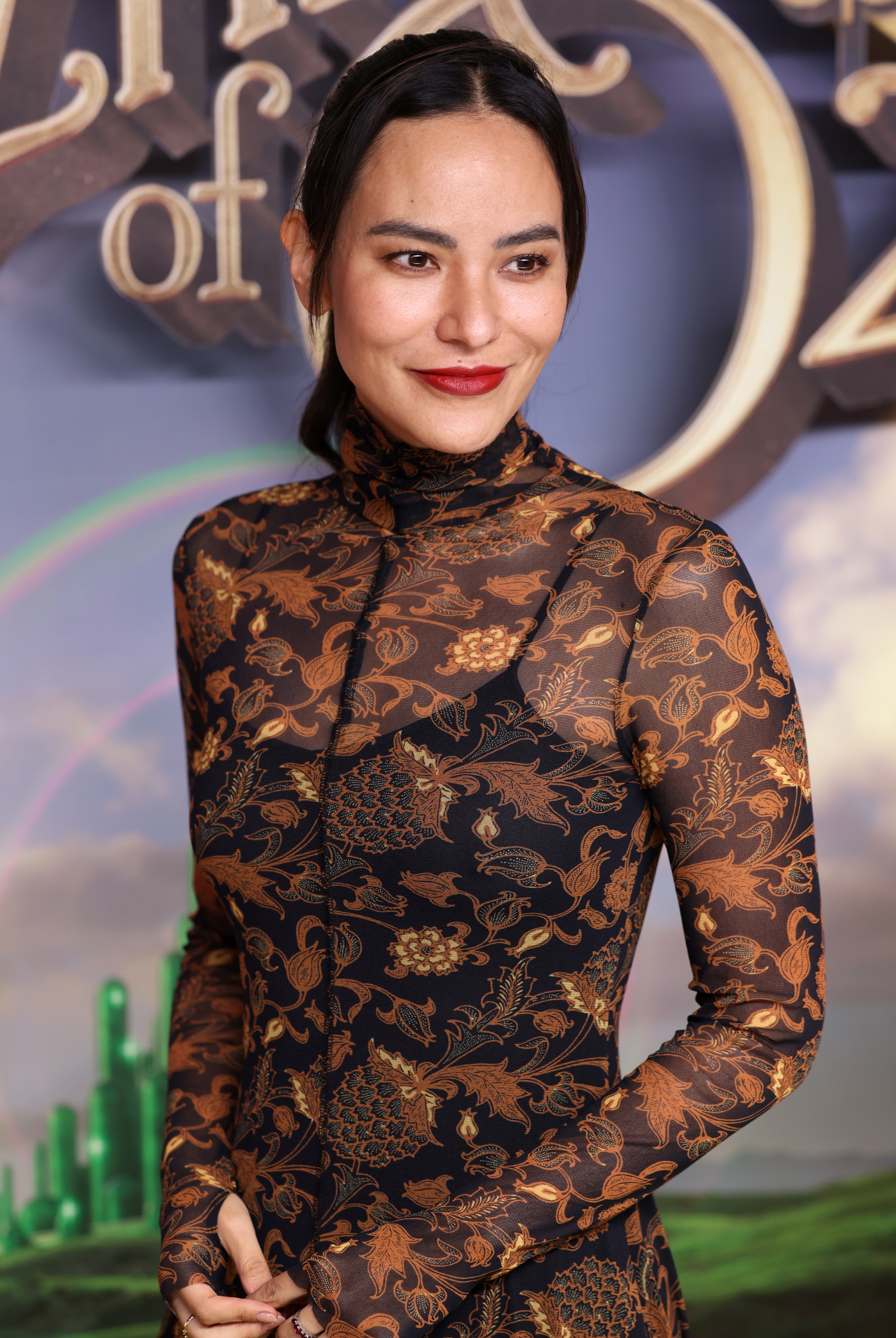
Matten at the premier of The Wizard of Oz at Sphere in Las Vegas.

Matten continued to work as a model as an adult. Some of her work was on fashion runways, and other jobs were in TV commercials such as for Nature Valley and Nintendo Wii. She worked for her father in marketing in London for several years before becoming an actor. She worked "a little stint at Elle magazine in an internship as well.

Matten appeared in five international/Native People’s television series in eight years including the Discovery Canada and Netflix series Frontier starring Jason Momoa, and the CW Network and CBC drama series Burden of Truth. In 2020, Matten began starring in Tribal on the APTN Network. She plays the newly appointed chief of an indigenous police force in Alberta, Canada. She was also an associate producer on the series.

She also previously starred in the short film A Red Girl’s Reasoning which received an award at the Imagine NATIVE Film Festival. In 2020, Matten appeared in the horror movie The Empty Man for Disney/20th Century Fox studios.

Beginning in 2022, Matten co-starred in the TV crime drama series Dark Winds as Bernadette Manuelito, the only female sergeant on a Navajo reservation police department. She also starred in the film Rez Ball (2024), which is about a Native American high school basketball team from Chuska Valley, New Mexico, that is competing for the state championship title but loses their star player.

Matten voices Katara in the Avatar Aang: The Last Airbender movie. Although Mae Whitman voiced Katara in the original Avatar: The Last Airbender, she announced that despite having been honoured to play her, she's excited to see this new iteration. According to the casting director for the new Avatar movie, Jenny Jue, the decision to recast the principal characters of the show was due to an increased emphasis on matching voice actor's ethnic and racial backgrounds to that of the character that they are portraying that arose in the industry after the conclusion of the original series.

Matten is also the president of 7 Forward Entertainment, an indigenous-owned production company based on the west coast of Canada.

== Other activities ==
Matten has worked for over 25 years in suicide prevention and addiction counseling for native communities, particularly for youth.

She is a co-founder of the Counting Coup Indigenous Film Academy (CCIFA), an educational environment for creative work, where emerging and aspiring First Nations, Métis and Inuit artists can gain expertise and experience in film. Partnered with Old Sun Community College, it also offers training for stunt combat.

She has been additionally characterized as "a Cree community organiser who runs the viral campaign #N8Vgirls, to publicise the same issue as #mmiw (Missing and Murdered Indigenous Women), a Canadian hashtag campaign on Twitter to honour the lives of those who have been devalued and discarded by the nation-state as well as by individual (predominantly white male) agents of violence."

== Personal life ==
Matten resides in her hometown, Edmonton. Although she is generally private about her personal life, she shared social media posts that she was dating Brendt Thomas Diabo, a Mohawk actor, artist and rock musician. Both of them performed in the Netflix series Frontier. She runs an indigenous wellness and fitness company with her family called Lemon Cree. She also runs a campaign called #N8Vgirls to help spread awareness about the murdered and missing indigenous women in Canada.

== Partial filmography ==
Acting performances
Year	Title	Role	Notes
2012	A Red Girl's Reasoning	Delia	Short film
2014–2015	Blackstone	Gina	12 episodes
2016–2018	Frontier	Sokanon	18 episodes
2018–2019	Burden of Truth	Gerrilyn Spence	14 episodes
2020	The Empty Man	Fiona	
2020–2021	Tribal	Sam Woodburn	18 episodes
2022–present	Dark Winds	Bernadette Manuelito	Main role
2024	Rez Ball	Heather Hobbs	
2026	Avatar Aang: The Last Airbender	Katara	
