= Charlie Smith (drummer) =

American jazz musician

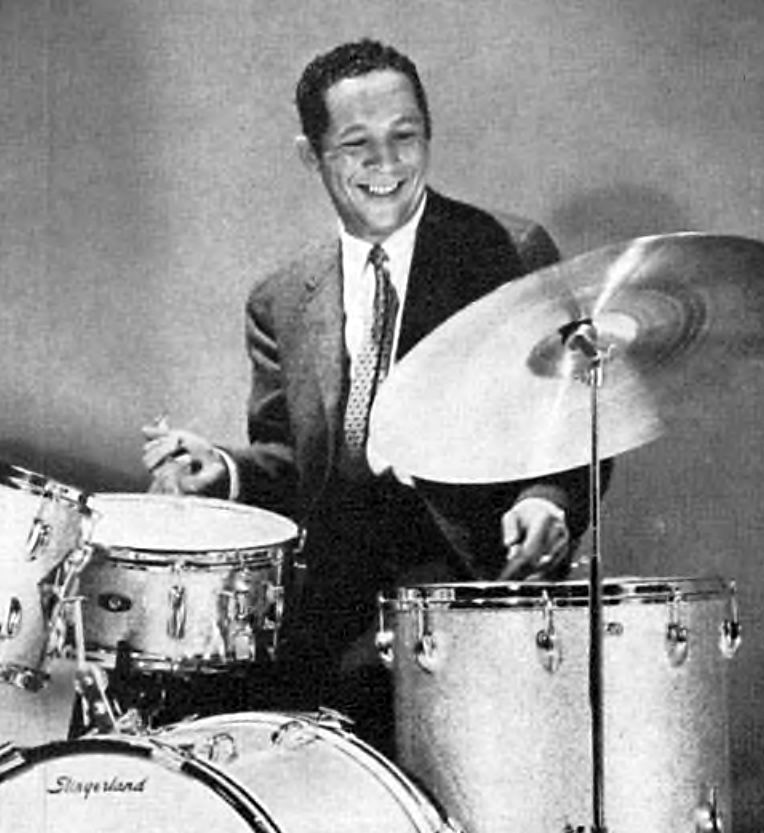
- Smith in a 1964 DownBeat advertisement

Background information
- Born: April 15, 1927; New York City, New York, U.S.
- Died: January 15, 1966 (aged 38); New Haven, Connecticut, U.S.
- Genres: Jazz
- Occupation: Musician
- Years active: 1940s–1966

Charlie Smith (April 15, 1927 in New York City – January 15, 1966 in New Haven), was an American jazz drummer.

Smith played locally in New York in the late 1940s before taking a position accompanying Ella Fitzgerald. He worked briefly with the Duke Ellington's Orchestra in 1951 before being replaced by Louie Bellson, and also played with Joe Bushkin, Erroll Garner, Slim Gaillard, Benny Goodman, Hot Lips Page, Oscar Peterson, Artie Shaw, and Slam Stewart. He performed on television with Dizzy Gillespie and Charlie Parker in 1952, and later in the 1950s worked with Billy Taylor, Aaron Bell, and Wild Bill Davison. He relocated to New Haven around 1960, where he played with Willie Ruff and Dwike Mitchell in a trio setting. He also worked as an educator late in life.

Smith co-wrote, with Thomas Vaughan, "A Jazz Liturgy" for Yale Divinity School. He died of a kidney infection.

== Discography ==
- Mitchell-Ruff Trio, The Catbird Seat (Atlantic, 1961; reissued on CD combined with Les McCann, Much Les as 20 Special Fingers)
- Mitchell-Ruff Trio, After this Message (Atlantic, 1966)
- Ella Fitzgerald With Ray Brown Trio & Quintet Featuring Charlie Smith, Hank Jones, Kai Winding, Allen Eager Plus Lester Young, Brew Moore, Roy Haynes, Royal Roost Sessions (Cool & Blue, 1993)
- Oscar Pettiford Quartet with Billy Taylor, Charles Mingus, Charlie Smith, Discoveries (Savoy, 1952)
