= Nancy Utley =

American film producer and executive

- Education: Northwestern University Medill School of Journalism
- Known for: Film production and distribution
- Elected: Academy of Motion Pictures Arts and Sciences Board of Governors

Nancy Utley (née Derk) is an American film producer and studio executive. She held the positions Executive Vice President of Marketing at 20th Century Fox and co-president and co-chairman of Searchlight Pictures. Under Utley’s leadership, Searchlight Pictures received 122 Golden Globe nominations, 159 Oscar nominations, and 40 Oscars, including four Best Picture Awards. Since 2021, Utley has run Lake Ellyn Entertainment, a production company she founded.

Utley is also a former member of the Academy of Motion Picture Arts and Sciences’ Board of Governors.

Utley is a philanthropist, having worked with various volunteering and charity organizations. She is on the Board of Directors of Lupus L.A., a non-profit health organization that supports medical research, operates fundraising, and provides patient support and advocacy.

== Early life and education ==
Utley grew up outside of Chicago in Glen Ellyn, Illinois. She attended Glenbard West High School and graduated in 1973.

After graduating high school, Utley attended the Medill School of Journalism at Northwestern University to pursue a career in reporting, graduating with a Bachelor’s Degree in Journalism in 1977 and a Master’s Degree in Journalism in 1978. Utley was part of the Xi chapter of the Chi Omega sorority at Northwestern.

Utley originally desired to pursue journalism as a career, but cites an undergraduate advertising class as sparking a curiosity in the business of marketing. She then concentrated in advertising at graduate school.

== Career ==
Utley’s first job out of college was in media planning and buying at Grey Advertising, now Grey Global Group, in New York, where she eventually became the vice president of media. At Grey Advertising, she was introduced to the world of entertainment business through taking on Warner Bros. as a client. Working on the Warner Bros.’ account inspired her to pursue a career in the film industry.

=== 20th Century Fox ===
Utley started working at 20th Century Fox in 1986. Her first role was head of media planning, where she worked on the marketing budget. Roles she held during her time at 20th Century Fox include Vice President of Media, Senior Vice President of Media and Research, and Executive Vice President of Marketing, Media, and Research, working on, organizing, and supervising advertising efforts. At 20th Century Fox Films, Utley held the positions of Chief Operating Officer and Executive Vice President of Marketing, overseeing general business operations as well as overseeing marketing efforts for films.

Utley cites Bob Harper, former vice chairman of 20th Century Fox, as a key mentor from her days at the company.

=== Searchlight Pictures ===
Utley joined Fox’s Searchlight branch in 1999, and she served in leadership capacities for over 20 years, from 1999 until her retirement from the company in 2021.

She became co-president of the branch in 2009. In 2018, Utley and co-president Steve Gilula were promoted from presidents to co-chairmen. When The Walt Disney Company acquired 21st Century Fox in 2019, Fox Searchlight became an asset of Disney and was renamed Searchlight Pictures in 2020. Utley and Gilula stayed on through the transition and remained co-chairmen of the newly renamed studio.

Under her leadership with Gilula, Searchlight received 122 Golden Globe nominations, 159 Oscar nominations, and 40 Oscars, including four Best Picture Awards. Notable films released under Utley’s tenure at Searchlight include Jojo Rabbit, The Favourite, Three Billboards Outside Ebbing, Missouri; The Grand Budapest Hotel, Beasts of the Southern Wild, The Best Exotic Marigold Hotel, Juno, Little Miss Sunshine, Napoleon Dynamite, Boys Don’t Cry, Black Swan, Sideways, The Tree of Life, Nightmare Alley, Slumdog Millionaire, The Shape of Water, 12 Years a Slave, and Nomadland. As of 2018, Searchlight had grossed over $5 billion in worldwide box office sales.

=== Academy of Motion Pictures Arts and Sciences ===
Utley was elected to the Academy’s Board of Governors on the Public Relations Branch in 2013. She continued serving the Academy board in the Marketing and Public Relations Branch from 2013 through 2022. Apart from her board position, Utley also briefly served as one of the board’s Vice Presidents in 2016, under the title of Education and Outreach Committee chair. She was elected to this position in 2016.

=== Lake Ellyn Entertainment ===
Six months after retiring from Searchlight, in October 2021, Utley launched a production company called Lake Ellyn Entertainment. This company seeks to produce film and television content through a deal with Chernin Entertainment. Chernin Entertainment’s release deal with streaming service Netflix extends to Lake Ellyn Entertainment.

Utley is a producer on Rez Ball, a Netflix original movie about a Native American high school basketball team set in New Mexico. Rez Ball was released in 2024.

=== Mentorship and philanthropy ===
As chair of the Academy’s Education and Outreach Committee, Utley oversaw the launch of the Academy Gold Talent Development and Inclusion Initiative. The Gold Initiative is a summer internship and mentorship program that works to serve film industry career hopefuls from underrepresented communities.

Within the entertainment industry, Utley has served and continues to be active in mentorship roles. She has worked with organizations such as Fox’s high potential employee program, Big Brothers Big Sisters of America, The Film Foundation, Step Up Women’s Network (a national mentorship organization for young women), and Film Independent’s Project Involve (a film industry mentorship program for up-and-coming filmmakers).

Outside of the entertainment industry, Utley has worked with the International Rescue Committee and the health research and patient support organization Lupus L.A.

In 2018, Utley was presented the David J. Wallace Founder’s Award by Lupus L.A. at the organization's annual Orange Ball. As of April 2023, Utley serves on Lupus L.A.’s Board of Directors.

== Personal life ==
As of April 2023, Utley is married to character actor Raymond Fitzpatrick. She has three daughters, Hannah, Emma, and Mia, as well as four stepchildren, Jesse Jacobs and Abra Goldemberg whom she shared with her late husband, John Jacobs. as well as two stepchildren, John Fitzpatrick and Katy Fitzpatrick, with her current husband.

Utley is the sister of Tim Derk, the creator and original performer of the San Antonio Spurs Coyote Mascot. Derk is a recipient of the Lifetime Achievement Award from the NBA Hall of Fame and author of Hi Mom, Send Sheep: My Life as the Coyote and After Utley is also the sister of MetroNet executive James Derk

Utley herself was diagnosed with Lupus in 1991, inspiring and guiding her work with Lupus L.A.

== Awards and accolades ==
The following is a list of major awards and recognitions received by Utley.

=== Entertainment recognitions ===
- The Hollywood Reporter’s Women in Entertainment 2011: Power 100
- 2014 Variety Women’s Impact Honors
- 2017 Variety500 Honoree
- 2018 Variety500 Honoree
- 2019 Variety500 Honoree
- 2020 Variety500 Honoree
- 2018 Directors Guild of America Honoree

=== Achievement accolades ===
- Chi Omega Malinda Jolley Morton Woman of Achievement 2012
- Northwestern Medill Hall of Achievement 2015 Inductee

=== Philanthropic awards ===
- Lupus L.A. Daniel J. Wallace Founder’s Award

=== Films that received the “Best Picture” Academy Award under Utley’s purview ===
- Slumdog Millionaire
- 12 Years a Slave
- Birdman
- The Shape of Water
- Nomadland
