= Podziemski =

Podziemski (feminine: Podziemska) is a Polish surname. May refer to:

- Brandin Podziemski (born 2003), Polish-American basketball player
- Jan Stanisław Podziemski (1897–?), Polish lieutenant colonel
- Justyna Podziemska (born 1985), Polish basketball player

== See also ==
- Podemski
