= Duke Ambassadors =

Student-run jazz band at Duke University (1934–1964)

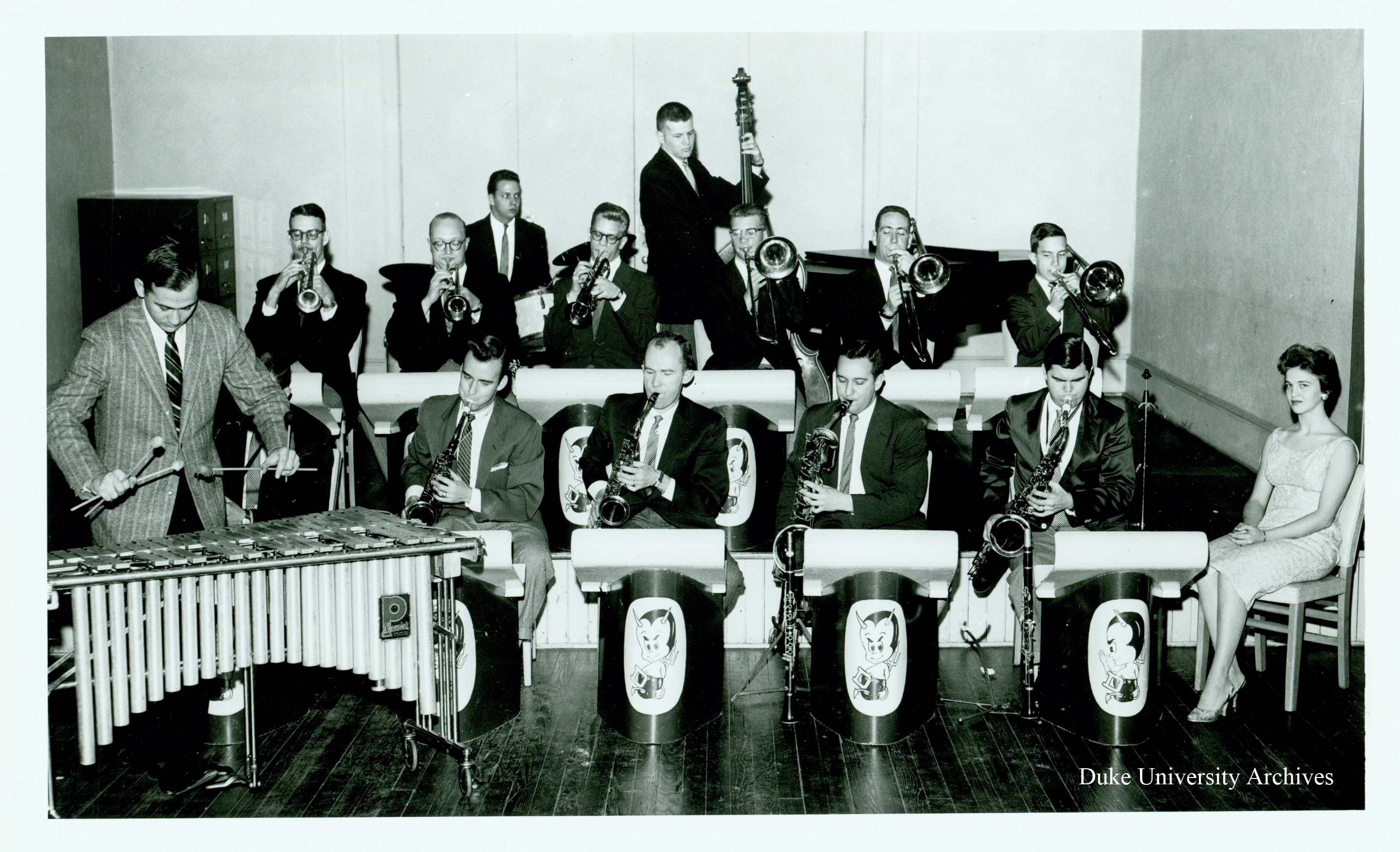
The Duke Ambassadors performing in 1958

The Duke Ambassadors was a student-run jazz big band, active at Duke University from 1934 to 1964. Student-run big bands began again in 1969 as the Duke Stage Band and from 1971 to 1974 as the Duke Jazz Ensemble. From 1974 to the present, professional musician-educators have led the Duke Jazz Ensemble.

== History of musical performance at Duke University ==
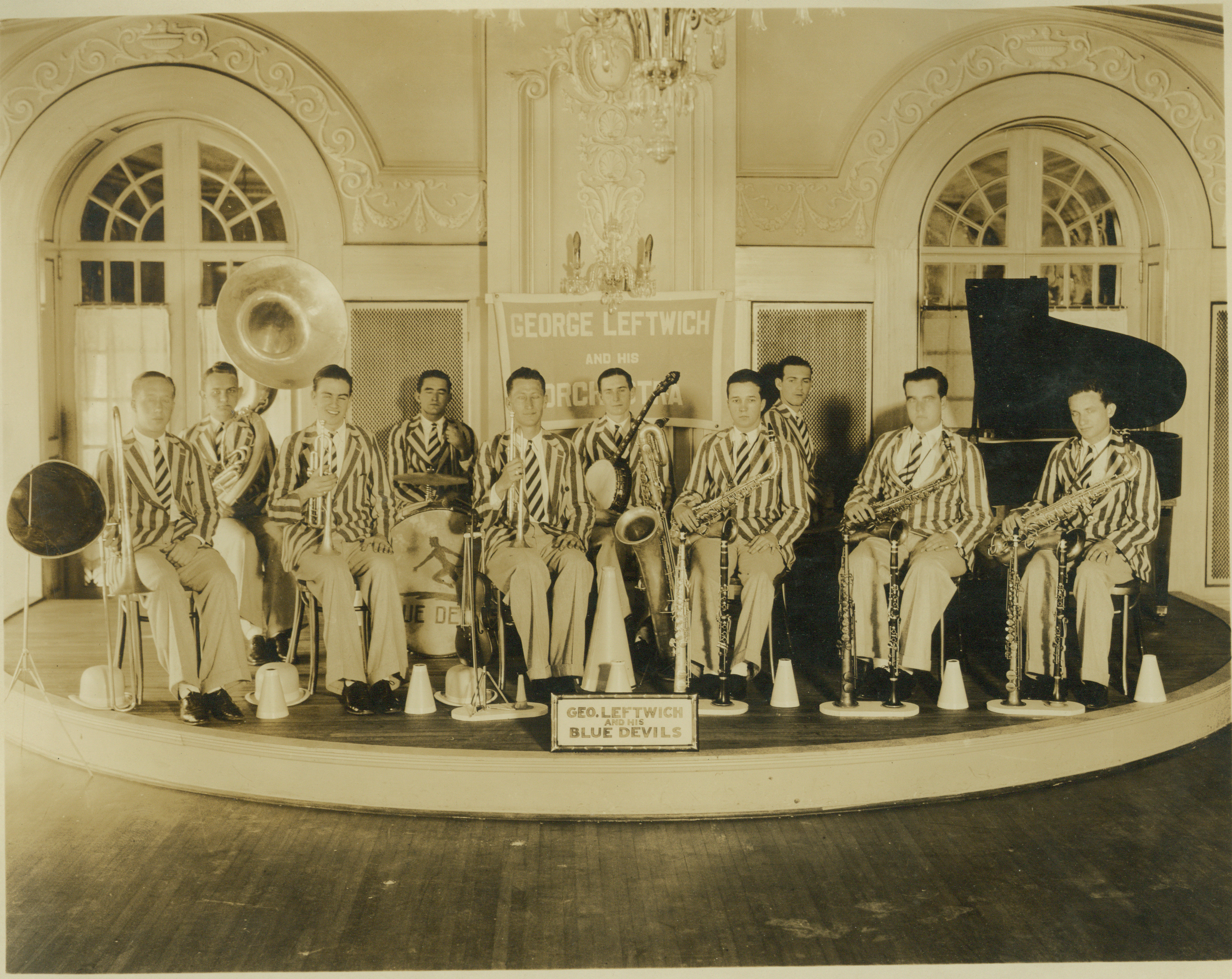
George "Jelly" Leftwich and His Blue Devils in the late 1920s

Music instruction and performance played a relatively minor role in the early years of Duke University (known as Trinity College until 1924). While there was a Glee Club at Trinity in the late 19th century, music was not a part of the formal curriculum. As Trinity College thrived in the early 20th century, so did student music groups. By 1916 Trinity supported a "Music Council" that included three faculty members along with the student leaders of the three campus musical groups: the Glee Club, the University Band, and the Symphony Orchestra.

In 1926, the recently renamed Duke University hired George "Jelly" Leftwich Jr. as the university's first director of instrumental music, a post he would hold until 1933. Leftwich brought a compelling vision for musical performance to campus and quickly developed the Duke Symphony Orchestra into one of the best collegiate orchestras in the south. In addition to reviving the orchestra, Leftwich started additional groups including Jelly Leftwich and his Blue Devils and the University Club Orchestra.

== Student band leaders at Duke University ==
Leftwich's ambition and success encouraged numerous students to form their own musical groups in the 1930s, including Johnny Long and the Duke Collegians (founded in 1931), Nick "the Crooning Half-back" Laney and his Blue Devil Orchestra (founded in 1932), Sonny Burke and The Duke Ambassadors (founded in 1934), and Les Brown and His Blue Devils (founded in 1933). The Ambassadors were the longest-lasting group of the four, continuing at Duke from 1934 until 1964, with a brief war-related sabbatical from 1943 to 1946. Other bands formed at Duke during this period were Swing Kings, Blue Dukes, Blue Imps, Grand Dukes, and the D-Men.

The Duke Collegians, under Johnny Long's direction, was considered by many to be the south's leading collegiate orchestra. Long, a violinist and band leader, achieved professional musical success after graduating from Duke through forming and leading The Johnny Long Orchestra. The group initially recorded for Vocalion Records, performing the hit "Just Like That" in 1937. Later in the 1930s, the band signed with Decca Records, for whom they recorded hits such as "In a Shanty in Old Shanty Town", which sold over one million copies, "My Dreams Are Getting Better All the Time", and "Poor Butterfly". Long continued to lead the band until his retirements in the 1960s.

Nick Laney and His Blue Devil Orchestra played regularly on Duke's campus and throughout North Carolina in the early 1930s. One of the band's most significant accomplishments was its selection from over 150 college bands to play with Guy Lombardo at the Roosevelt Hotel in New York City during the winter break of 1932–33. Previously, during a summer tour in the northeast in 1932, the band had met an up-and-coming saxophone player by the name of Les Brown. As Brown later recalled the meeting, "In the summer of 1932, I had the good fortune to meet Nick Laney and The Duke Blue Devils in Boston... Although I was headed for the University of Pennsylvania, Nick encouraged me to join his dance band on tenor sax. I did, and spent four wonderful years at Duke."

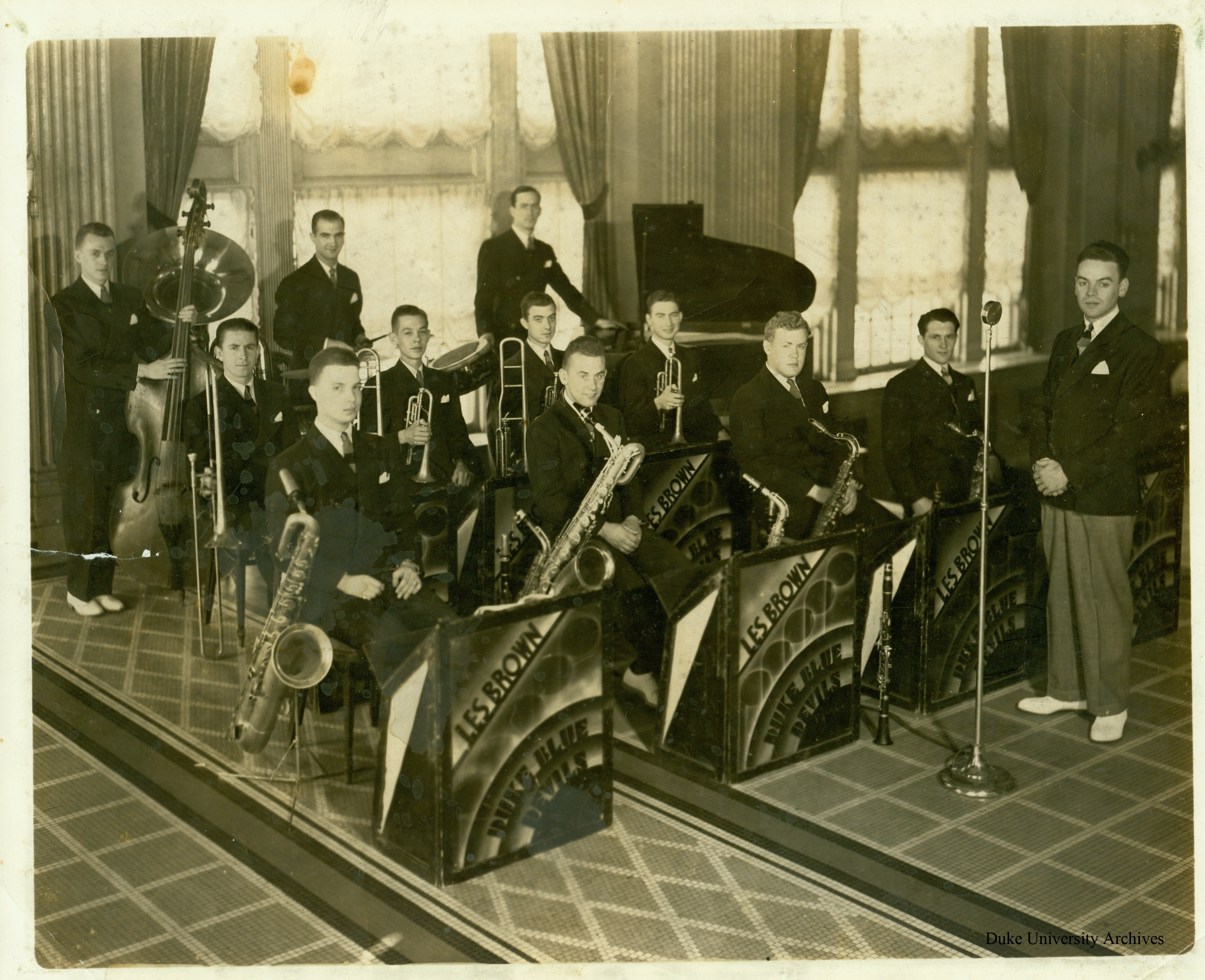
Les Brown and His Blue Devils performing in the 1930s

One year into his time at Duke, Brown took over leadership of the Blue Devils, which Laney had vacated upon graduating in 1933. Brown led the group Les Brown and his Blue Devils from 1933 to 1936, achieving prominence across the southeast through regular tours of the region. Brown took the band on a particularly successful regional tour during the summer of 1936, after which he relocated to New York City to pursue a professional career in music.

It was there a mere two years later, in 1938, that Brown formed the group Les Brown and His Band of Renown. The band achieved immediate success, performing such notable hit songs as "Sentimental Journey" (1945), whose release coincided with the end of World War II in Europe and became the unofficial homecoming theme for many veterans. The band recorded numerous other hit songs, including "My Dreams Are Getting Better All the Time" (1945) and "I've Got My Love to Keep Me Warm" (1946). The band's featured vocalist during this period was Doris Day, who Brown had recruited to join the group in the 1940s. The band went on to perform for nearly fifty years with Bob Hope, while also serving as the house band for "The Steve Allen Show" (1959–61) and "The Dean Martin Show" (1963–72). In 1993–94 Brown received a Distinguished Alumni Award from Duke University. Upon Brown's passing in 2001, his son Les Brown Jr. became the leader of the Band of Renown.

== The Duke Ambassadors ==
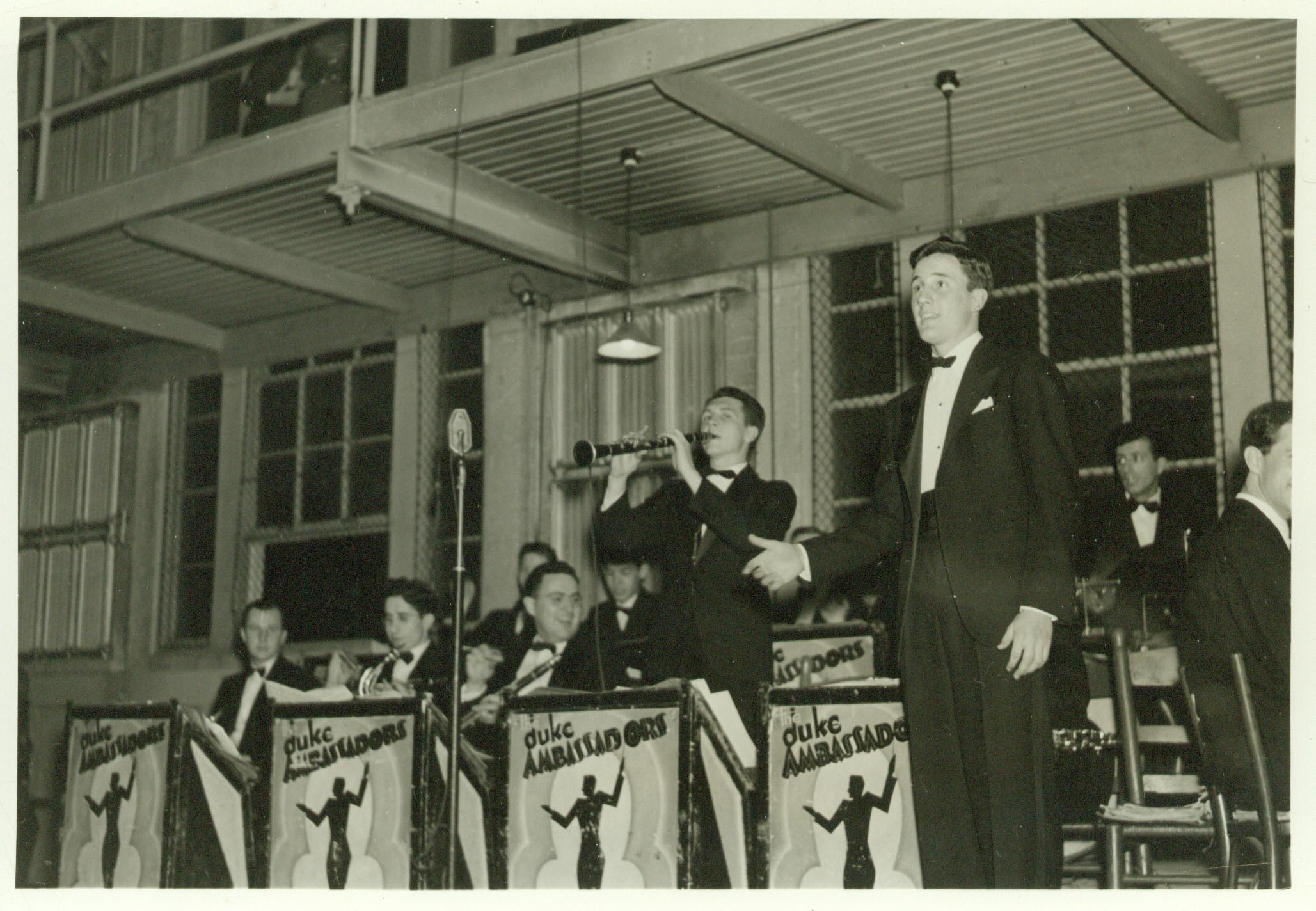
The Duke Ambassadors performing in 1937

Sonny Burke, who played piano, violin, and vibraphone, founded the Duke Ambassadors in 1934 and led the group for the next three years. After graduating from Duke, Burke went on to a successful career as a band leader, composer, and arranger. He wrote arrangements for Charlie Spivak (1940–1942) and Jimmy Dorsey (1942–1945), among others, and collaborated with Peggy Lee to compose the music for the Disney animated film "Lady and the Tramp" (1955). Burke recorded several albums throughout the 1950s and 1960s and worked in the studio with artists including Frank Sinatra, Mel Tormé, Louis Armstrong, and Ella Fitzgerald. He was the recording director for Decca Records, Reprise Records, and Warner Brothers Records and was also the founder and president of Daybreak Records prior to his passing in 1980.

After Burke graduated from Duke in 1937, The Duke Ambassadors continued performing for nearly thirty more years, under fourteen different student leaders. Sammy Fletcher, who led and played drums in the group from 1942 to 1943 and again from 1946 to 1947, took the group on a successful tour of New York in the summer of 1942. During the tour, the group appeared at the Old Orchard Beach in Maine, engaged in a battle of the bands with both Fletcher Henderson's and Ray McKinley's bands, and enjoyed co-billings with Benny Goodman and Claude Thornhill. Another highlight occurred in 1953–54, when the Ambassadors, under the leadership of Jack Hail, were hired to conduct two State Department-sponsored tours overseas as a form of cultural diplomacy.

Throughout The Ambassadors' thirty-year existence, numerous other members went on to professional success in music. Dutch McMillin, for example, led the Ambassadors from 1938 to 1940. After graduating from Duke and serving as a fighter pilot in WWII, he worked professionally as a session saxophonist in Nashville for much of the 1950s, performing on recordings with Buddy Holly, Roy Orbison, Chet Atkins, and Brenda Lee, among others. In 1955, he released a recording under his own name for Decca Records titled "The Waltz You Saved For Me". Bill Pape, who led the Ambassadors from 1955 to 1956, went on to play lead trombone and work as an arranger for Glenn Miller, Si Zentner, and others. Pape also later became the musical director and principal arranger for the bands at Walt Disney World.

Creed Taylor played trumpet in the Duke Ambassadors, as well as in the quintet The Five Dukes, from 1948 to 1951. He credits Les Brown's association with Duke as initially drawing him to the university. As he recalls, "The reason I went to Duke was from hearing Les Brown and all the history of the bands who went through Duke. This was really a great jazz band... and the book was handed down from one class to the next, you had to audition and all the best players who came to Duke got in the band... I had a ball when I was there." After graduating from Duke in 1951 with a degree in psychology, Taylor spent two years in the Marines before returning to Duke for a year of graduate study.

Shortly thereafter, he relocated to New York City where he worked for record companies including Bethlehem Records, ABC-Paramount, Verve, and A&M Records. Some of his accomplishments during this period include founding the Impulse! label in 1960, introducing bossa nova to the US through recordings such as "The Girl from Ipanema" with Antonio Carlos Jobim and Stan Getz, and producing popular recordings by Charles Mingus, Ray Charles, Wes Montgomery, and others. In 1969, Taylor established CTI Records as an independent company, recording musicians including Freddie Hubbard, Stanley Turrentine, George Benson, Gerry Mulligan, Herbie Hancock, and many others. After a brief distribution deal with Motown Records in the late 1970s, CTI became a part of Columbia Records, which oversaw various reissue programs of CTI's early 1970s material. In 1990, Taylor formed a new CTI which has issued dozens of recordings as of 2009.

Pat Williams led The Ambassadors from 1959 to 1961, after which he pursued graduate studies in composition and conducting from Columbia University. He then relocated to California where he has worked ever since as a composer, arranger, and educator. Williams has composed music for over 65 feature films, 100 television films, and 25 television series, as well as 18 albums and 30 concert works. In 1977 he was nominated for a Pulitzer Prize in music composition for his work "An American Concerto," which featured a jazz quartet and a symphony orchestra. He has also won numerous Emmy Awards and Grammy Awards for his compositions. Williams has composed and arranged music for Frank Sinatra, Gerry Mulligan, Eddie Daniels, Natalie Cole, John Pizzarelli, Barbra Streisand, and numerous others. He has also remained active in music education, holding posts at the University of Utah and the University of Colorado. In 2001, Williams received an honorary doctorate degree from Duke University.

Frank Bennett served as the percussionist, arranger, and last student leader of the Duke Ambassadors from 1962 to 1964. After graduating from Duke, he completed a Doctor of Musical Arts degree from Yale University. Since then, he has enjoyed a career as a percussionist in a variety of jazz ensembles, symphony orchestras, and Indian music ensembles, performing with Jimmy Heath, Benny Goodman, Lou Donaldson, and others. Additionally, Bennett has orchestrated and arranged the music for over one hundred feature films and numerous television shows, for which he has received two Emmy Award citations. He continues to compose and perform regularly.

== Recent developments ==
After the 1964 season, the Duke Ambassadors disbanded, in part due to a decreased need to have a swing band provide dance music at social functions. While the disbanding of the Duke Ambassadors began a four-year period without an organized jazz band at Duke, student interest in jazz continued at the university. In 1969, Prof Paul Bryan provided faculty support and student John Howell reignited Duke's extremely rich big band tradition by forming the student-run jazz band known as the Duke Stage Band. The band was renamed the Duke Jazz Ensemble in 1971 to reflect the change from a "stage" centered band that intended the audience to dance, to a more jazz performance centered group. Bruce Klitzman led the band from 1972 until May 1974. Under Klitzman's leadership, the Jazz Ensemble's close ties to the student body were strengthened by performing at many student gatherings each semester, including outdoors in the Sarah P. Duke Gardens or on the main quad (later named Abele Quad), and inside in Duke Indoor Stadium (renamed Cameron Indoor Stadium after 1972) at halftime of the Duke basketball games. Attendance was always high, admission was always free, and the group was much loved by the student body. Klitzman pushed to increase music department support for the rich jazz heritage at Duke. Frank Tirro joined the Duke faculty in 1973 and championed the study and preservation of jazz. Jesse Holton, a local high school band director was invited to be guest conductor of the Duke Jazz Ensemble for some performances from 1971 to 1974, but the group remained largely student run. The student director booked the performances, moved equipment, and handled publicity and logistics. Bill Sando and Steve Goldsmith were the student leaders for 1974–75.

In late 1974, Frank Tirro successfully recruited saxophonist-educator Jerry Coker from Miami to lead the Duke Jazz Ensemble. Coker's arrival marked a major transition of big band jazz at Duke from being student run to being led by a professional jazz musician-educator. Although the student-run Duke Ambassadors no longer exists, the Duke Jazz Ensemble in recent decades has been led by an illustrious lineage of faculty directors including Jerry Coker, Willie Ruff, Mary Lou Williams, Paul Jeffrey, and John Brown. The Duke Jazz Ensemble has continued in the tradition of many college big bands and, in the process, has trained a new generation of contributors to jazz and contemporary music. Perhaps Les Brown put it best when he reminisced, "I'm sure it's unique in the history of American colleges that so many bandleaders, arrangers and composers had their beginnings at one university and went on to successfully carve out careers in the national music scene... Thank you, Duke, for supporting good music. I, for one, appreciate it immensely!"

== Duke University big band leaders, 1926–2016 ==
Leader	Dates	Band Name	
George "Jelly" Leftwich Jr.	1926–28	Blue Devils	
George "Jelly" Leftwich Jr.	1928–33	University Club Jazz Orchestra	
Johnny Long	1931–34	Johnny Long and His Duke Collegians	
Nick Laney	1931–34	Nick Laney and His Blue Devils Orchestra	
Les Brown	1933–36	Les Brown and His Blue Devils	
Sonny Burke	1934–37	Duke Ambassadors	
Frank Gerard	1937–38	Frankie Gerard and His D Men	
Howard Winterson	1937–38	Duke Ambassadors	
Dutch McMillin	1938–40	Duke Ambassadors	
Vince Courtney	1940–42	Duke Ambassadors	
Phil Messenkoff	1941–43	Phil Messenkoff and His Blue Satans	
Sammy Fletcher	1942–43, 1946–47	Duke Ambassadors	
Tommy Farr	1947–48	Duke Ambassadors	
Bill Byers	1948–52	Duke Cavaliers	
Fred Whitener	1949–51	Duke Ambassadors	
Benny Steele	1951–53	Duke Ambassadors	
Jack Hail	1953–55	Duke Ambassadors	
Bill Pape	1955–56	Duke Ambassadors	
Kenny Jolls	1956–57	Duke Ambassadors	
Bob Hutchins	1957–59	Duke Ambassadors	
Pat Williams	1959–61	Duke Ambassadors	
Frank Bennett III	1962–64	Duke Ambassadors	
John Howell (with Prof Paul Bryan)	1969–72	Duke Stage Band [Duke Jazz Ensemble]	
William Read Rankin (First Trumpet)	1968–73	Duke Jazz Ensemble & Stage Band	
Bruce Klitzman, Director (Jesse Holton, guest concert Director 1971–74)	1972–74, except for Spring 1973	Duke Jazz Ensemble	Lead Trumpet 1973–74 Duke Jazz Ensemble
Bill Sando and Steve Goldsmith (Jesse Holton, guest concert Director 1973–75)	Spring, 1973 and Fall, 1974–75	Duke Jazz Ensemble	
Jerry Coker	1974–75	Duke Jazz Ensemble	
Dan Bonsanti	Fall 1975	Duke Jazz Ensemble	
Willie Ruff. Dwike Mitchell	1976	Duke Jazz Ensemble	
Paul Milesi	1976–77	Duke Jazz Ensemble	
Mary Lou Williams	1977–81	Duke Jazz Ensemble	
Paul Jeffrey	1982–03	Duke Jazz Ensemble	
John Brown	2003–	Duke Jazz Ensemble	
