= 1491s =

Native American sketch comedy group

The 1491s
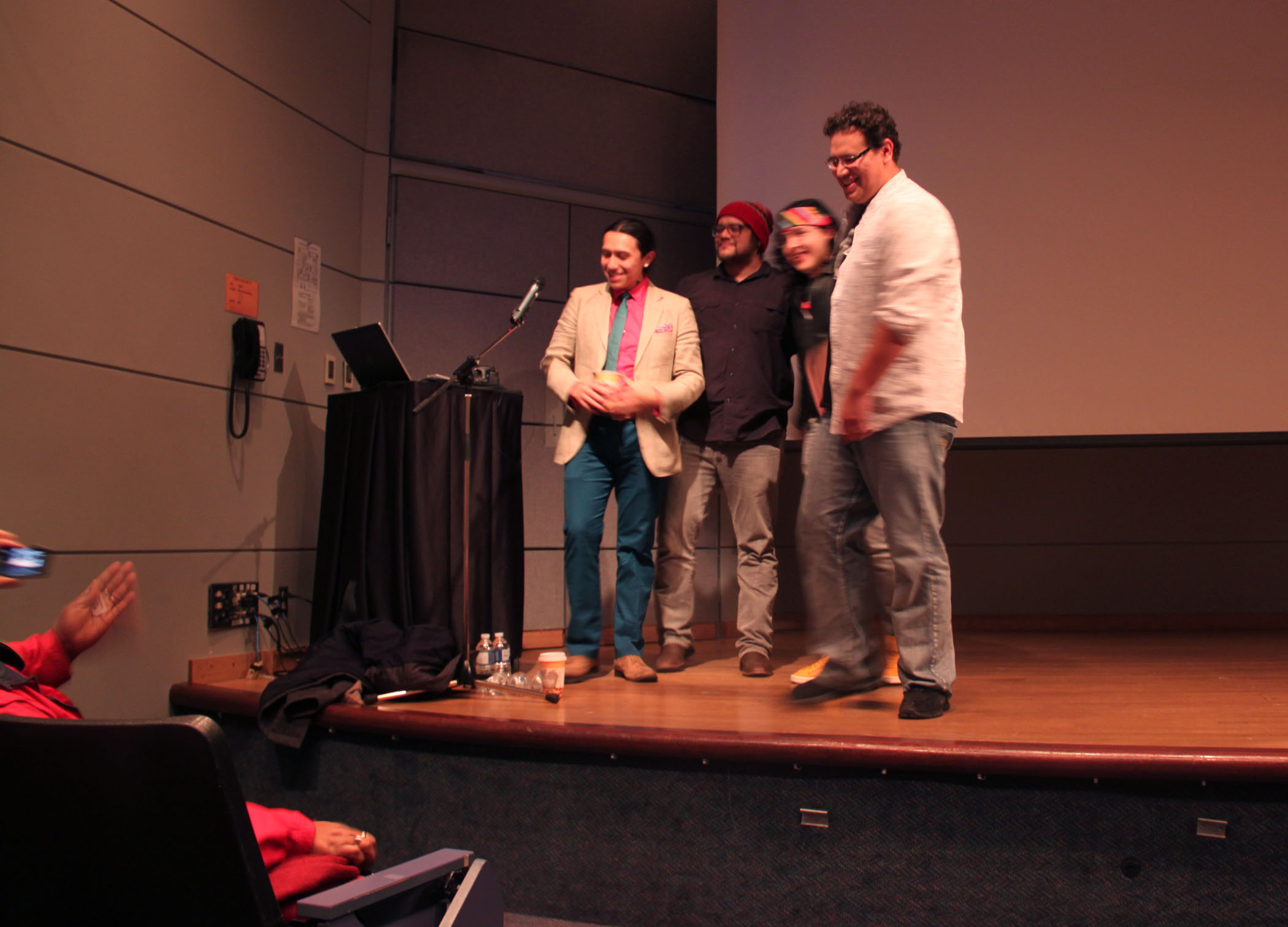
- Members of the 1491s banter with the audience in 2013 at Simon Fraser University. From left to right: Bobby Wilson, Sterlin Harjo, unidentified, Migizi Pensoneau (not pictured: Dallas Goldtooth, Ryan RedCorn).
- Notable work: New Moon Wolf Pack Auditions; To The Indigenous Woman - The Violence Against Women Act

Comedy career
- Years active: 2009–present
- Medium: Television; stage; video
- Genres: Sketch comedy, Narrative comedy
- Subjects: Native American culture; Indigenous rights
- Members: Dallas Goldtooth; Sterlin Harjo; Migizi Pensoneau; Ryan RedCorn; Bobby Wilson
- Website: www.1491s.com

The 1491s are a Native American sketch comedy group, with members based in Oklahoma, Minnesota, and Montana. While the members' sketch comedy has had a growing cult following since the mid-2000s, and their videos since 2009, they are perhaps best known for their work in more widely-known shows such as Rutherford Falls and Reservation Dogs.

Their comedy sketches, spoken word, and longer narrative works depict contemporary Native American life in the United States, using humor and satire to explore issues such as stereotypes and racism (internal and external), tribal politics, and the conflict between tradition and modernity. Their over 150 YouTube videos have frequently gone viral, including their first video, the Twilight parody "New Moon Wolf Pack Auditions!!!!"

A Los Angeles Times reporter described the group's output as "dozens of videos, some crass, some cryptic, some laugh-out-loud hilarious." Group member Dallas Goldtooth has cited British comedy legends Monty Python's Flying Circus as an influence. The group creates all of its pieces collectively.

The group's name is a reference to the year 1491, the year before the arrival of Christopher Columbus and widespread European colonization of the Americas began.

== Performances, film and television ==
The 1491s have been featured on The Daily Show, where they made featured content on the Native American mascot controversy. They have made videos for social and legislatives issues such as full inclusion of Indigenous women in the Violence Against Women Act. As member Bobby Wilson explains, "There's so much expectation put on Indigenous people in the arts, especially in the media. It comes from a longstanding tradition of non-Native people, most often white men, writing stories for Hollywood and the stage. We're fighting those tropes. If they show up in our work, it's just to lampoon them."

In 2018 the Oregon Shakespeare Festival, along with New Native Theatre, co-commissioned the 1491s to write a play for their American Revolutions series of new plays about US history. The play, which ran from April 7, 2019, to October 27, 2019, consists of linked comedy sketches covering events between the Wounded Knee Massacre of 1890 and the Wounded Knee Occupation of the 1970s – hence the title, Between Two Knees. Portland Observer critic Darleen Ortega called it "a feat of theater magic so satisfying that, after seeing it three times, I am determined to savor it at least twice more before it closes", while Lee Juillerat of the Herald and News wrote, "With gobs of humor, it politely lays a guilt trip on white people for the history of injustices against Native Americans." Between Two Knees was performed at Yale University from May 13 to June 4, 2022.

Members of the troupe have appeared in films and television shows directed by member Sterlin Harjo, and in 2021 four out of the five troupe members worked on the shows Rutherford Falls and Reservation Dogs, as actors, writers, directors and producers. As of season 2 of Reservation Dogs, with the addition of Ryan RedCorn to the writers' room, the entire troupe are working on the well-received show.

== Members ==
The individual members of the 1491s are:

- Dallas Goldtooth (Mdewakanton Dakota/Diné), Keystone XL campaign organizer for the Indigenous Environmental Network, Dakota language-instructor, writer, artist, and actor. His acting credits include Reservation Dogs, Rutherford Falls, Ghosts, and Hailey's On It!.
- Sterlin Harjo (Seminole/Muscogee), filmmaker and television director, co-creator of Reservation Dogs.
- Migizi Pensoneau (Ponca/Ojibwe), television and film writer, producer, and actor; has worked on the shows Barkskins, Rutherford Falls and Reservation Dogs. He worked as a Native cultural consultant for Avatar Studios. He was a writer and executive producer on Alien: Earth.
- Ryan Red Corn (Osage Nation) (has also been credited as Ryan Red Corn and Ryan Redcorn), graphic artist, photographer, writer, spoken word artist, and actor; serves on the Pawnee and Osage Court Appointed Special Advocates advisory board; has appeared in films such as Harjo's Barking Water. He joined Reservation Dogs as a writer in season 2, and acted in season 3.
- Bobby Wilson (aka Bobby Dues) (Sisseton Wahpeton Dakota), visual artist, writer, director, producer and actor, has worked on Rutherford Falls, Reservation Dogs, and Spirit Rangers.
