= Tribal (TV series) =

Canadian television series

- Genre: Drama
- Written by: Ron E. Scott; Adam Frost; Adriana Capozzi; Tamara Moulin; Christina Ray
- Directed by: Ron E. Scott; Asaf Benny
- Starring: Jessica Matten; Brian Markinson; Adam MacDonald
- Composer: Mike Shields
- Country of origin: Canada
- Original language: English
- No. of seasons: 2
- No. of episodes: 18

Production
- Executive producers: Ron E. Scott; Janet Hamley; Adam Frost
- Producers: Scott Lepp; Nancy Laing
- Production locations: Calgary, Alberta, Canada
- Cinematography: Asaf Benny
- Production company: Prairie Dog Film + Television

Original release
- Network: APTN
- Release: February 20, 2020 – present

Tribal is a Canadian television crime drama series, which premiered February 20, 2020, on APTN. The series stars Jessica Matten as Sam Woodburn, the newly appointed chief of an Indigenous police force in the Nêhiyawak First Nation in Alberta, and Brian Markinson as Chuck "Buke" Bukansky, a racist and sexist white cop from Calgary whom she is paired with to solve crimes.

The cast also includes Adam MacDonald, Ryan Northcott, Julian Black Antelope, Garry Chalk, Justin Rain, Michelle Thrush, Glen Gould, John Cassini, Joel Oulette, Marika Sila, and Georgina Lightning.

The first season consists of eight episodes directed by Ron E. Scott. In advance of the series premiere, APTN announced that the show will have a second season. The second season of ten episodes premiered on October 21, 2021, and was directed by Ron E. Scott and Asaf Benny.

The series was filmed in Calgary, Alberta.

== Premise ==
Following her predecessor's suspension due to allegations of corruption, Officer Sam Woodburn is appointed as the new interim Chief of the Justice Department's newly integrated Tribal Police Force. She is forced to partner up with Detective Chuck 'Buke' Bukansky who has a reputation for racism. Despite their conflicting views, the duo investigate crimes that involve or have direct links to the First Nations.

== Cast and characters ==
- Jessica Matten as Chief Samantha "Sam" Woodburn
- Brian Markinson as Detective Chuck "Buke" Bukansky
- Adam MacDonald as Detective Lucas Fielding
- Ryan Northcott as Detective Mitch Wheeler
- Julian Black Antelope as Daniel Crowchild
- Garry Chalk as Constance "Connie" Edwin Harris
- Sarah-Jane Redmond as Denise Bukansky
- Anita Brown as Alana Thompson
- Justin Rain as Ryan Streit (season 1)
- Jaren Brandt Bartlett as Nate Mercredi (season 1)
- Michelle Thrush as Jackie Woodburn (season 1)
- Glen Gould as Gordon Thundercloud (season 1)
- John Cassini as Jimmy Ganz (seasons 1–2)
- Ana Rice as Officer Tara Whitetail (season 1)
- Bernard Starlight as Phil Thundercloud (seasons 1–2)
- Stephen Huszar as Marcus Watkins (season 2)
- Marci T. House as Victoria Mann (season 2)
- Wesley French as Dallas Bullhead (season 2)
- Teneil Whiskeyjack as Alice Wajunta (season 2)
- Brendan Meyer as Hanson Bukansky (season 2)
- Savonna Spracklin as Casey Woodburn (season 2)
- Lincoln McGowan as Addison Sunridge (season 2)

== Series overview ==
Season	Episodes	Originally released	
Season	Episodes	First released	Last released
1	8	February 20, 2020	April 9, 2020
2	10	October 21, 2021	December 23, 2021

=== Season 1 (2020) ===
No. overall	No. in season	Title	Directed by	Written by	Original release date
1	1	"I'll Show You Chief"	Ron E. Scott	Ron E. Scott	February 20, 2020
2	2	"Two Out of Fifteen"	Ron E. Scott	Story by : Adam Frost & Ron E. Scott; Teleplay by : Ron E. Scott	February 27, 2020
3	3	"Indian Giver"	Ron E. Scott	Story by : Adam Frost & Ron E. Scott; Teleplay by : Adam Frost	March 5, 2020
4	4	"Runs with a Gun"	Ron E. Scott	Story by : Adam Frost & Ron E. Scott; Teleplay by : Christina Ray	March 12, 2020
5	5	"The Road to Hell Is Paved"	Ron E. Scott	Story by : Adam Frost & Ron E. Scott; Teleplay by : Adam Frost	March 19, 2020
6	6	"Where There's Smoke"	Ron E. Scott	Story by : Adam Frost & Ron E. Scott; Teleplay by : Tamara Moulin	March 26, 2020
7	7	"The Natives Are Restless"	Ron E. Scott	Story by : Adam Frost & Ron E. Scott; Teleplay by : Adam Frost	April 2, 2020
8	8	"Ten Little Indians"	Ron E. Scott	Adam Frost & Ron E. Scott	April 9, 2020

=== Season 2 (2021) ===
No. overall	No. in season	Title	Directed by	Written by	Original release date
9	1	"The Tomb"	Ron E. Scott	Adam Frost & Ron E. Scott	October 21, 2021
10	2	"It's All In Your Headdress"	Ron E. Scott	Adam Frost & Ron E. Scott	October 28, 2021
11	3	"Look He's Protestin'"	Ron E. Scott	Adam Frost & Ron E. Scott	November 4, 2021
12	4	"The Kid Had a Gun"	Ron E. Scott	Adam Frost & Ron E. Scott	November 11, 2021
13	5	"Shouldn't Have Come Here"	Ron E. Scott	Adriana Capozzi, Adam Frost & Ron E. Scott	November 18, 2021
14	6	"Justice For All"	Ron E. Scott	Adriana Capozzi, Adam Frost & Ron E. Scott	November 25, 2021
15	7	"Starlight, Starbright"	Asaf Benny	Jason Filiatrault, Adam Frost & Ron E. Scott	December 2, 2021
16	8	"Tribal vs Metro"	Asaf Benny	Adam Frost & Ron E. Scott	December 9, 2021
17	9	"Red Face"	Asaf Benny	Jason Filiatrault, Adam Frost & Ron E. Scott	December 16, 2021
18	10	"Scalped"	Asaf Benny	Adam Frost & Ron E. Scott	December 23, 2021

== Reception ==
In his year-end review of television in 2020, critic John Doyle of The Globe and Mail singled out both Markinson and Matten as having given two of the year's best performances in Canadian television.
