= Mekko =

2015 American drama film

- Film poster
- Directed by: Sterlin Harjo
- Written by: Sterlin Harjo
- Starring: Rod Rondeaux
- Release date: June 12, 2015
- Running time: 87 minutes
- Country: United States
- Language: English

Mekko is a 2015 American drama film directed by Sterlin Harjo. Harjo's third feature film, it is a thriller set among a community of homeless Native Americans in Tulsa.

== Plot ==
Mekko leaves prison, having served a long sentence for having killed his cousin in a brawl. He reflects on his family's knowing and the path that he strayed from, where he was considered a seer by the old people. He is haunted by visions of his own death and his ultimate fight with an evil spirit witch that takes the form of warriors or animal spirits. He knows he must confront it, but he fears his own weakness. Mekko meets a fellow Native American who says he is a warrior, but who actually preys on the weak while demanding respect. Mekko looks into the man's heart and sees that it is the dwelling place of a witch who has killed many times. Inevitably, a confrontation arises. Mekko tries to avoid it, but he knows that the witch is hunting him.

The title word 'mekko' means head person or 'town king' in the Muskogee language, native to the independent tribal towns of 18th-century Florida-Georgia-Alabama area of the Southeast USA.

== Cast ==
- Rod Rondeaux as Mekko
- Jamie Loy as Rita
- Scott Mason as Matt
- Zahn McClarnon as Bill
- Sarah Podemski as Tafv

== Production ==
On this production, Harjo was inspired by Werner Herzog's 1977 film Stroszek to aim for a heightened degree of naturalism, using many real locations and real people, rather than professional actors. He found many of his cast members among people he met at the Iron Gate soup kitchen in downtown Tulsa, and he also hired locals for nearly all of his crew, saying that he wanted his crew to be familiar with Tulsa and with Native Americans.

== Release ==
Mekko premiered at the Los Angeles Film Festival in June 2015. It was screened in the Contemporary World Cinema section of the 2015 Toronto International Film Festival; the imagineNATIVE Film + Media Arts Festival, where it was named best feature film; the Santa Fe Independent Film Festival, where it was named best narrative feature; and at the 2015 American Indian Film Festival, where it won the best film award as well as acting awards for stars Rod Rondeaux, Zahn McClarnon, and Sarah Podemski.

== Reviews ==
Variety critic Dennis Harvey complimented Rod Rondeaux's "soulful performance" in the title role, and compared the film to two classic films set on skid row, On the Bowery (1956) and The Exiles (1961).
