= Barking Water =

2009 Independent Film

- Directed by: Sterlin Harjo
- Written by: Sterlin Harjo
- Produced by: Chad Burris
- Starring: Richard Ray Whitman; Casey Camp-Horinek; Jon Proudstar
- Cinematography: Frederick Schroeder
- Edited by: David Michael Maurer
- Music by: Ryan Beveridge
- Production companies: Indion Entertainment Group; Dolpin Bay Films
- Release date: January 17, 2009 (Sundance)
- Country: United States
- Language: English

Barking Water is a 2009 American independent drama film written and directed by Sterlin Harjo that premiered at the 2009 Sundance Film Festival. Harjo's second feature film, it stars Richard Ray Whitman, Casey Camp-Horinek, Jon Proudstar, Aaron Riggs, Laura Spencer, Quese iMC, Ryan Red Corn, and Beau Harjo.

The film portrays a road trip by a dying man and his former lover across Oklahoma to visit friends and family, including his daughter and granddaughter in Wewoka, the capital of the Seminole Nation.

Barking Water was named best drama film at the 2009 American Indian Film Festival, and Casey Camp-Horinek was named best actress.
