= Duke Ellington Fellowship Program =

The Duke Ellington Fellowship Program is a community-based organization which sponsors artists mentoring and performing with Yale University students and young musicians from the New Haven public school system. It was created in 1972.

The Fellowship was the brainchild of Willie Ruff, a jazz musician and Yale University professor. About 40 notable musicians received medals in attendance at the inaugural fundraiser, including Marion Anderson, Paul Robeson, Eubie Blake, and Odetta, while Ellington personally mingled with the guests and patrons.
