= Sarah Podemski =

Canadian actress (born 1983)

Sarah Podemski (born 1983) is a Canadian actress, best known for her supporting role as Rita in the television series Reservation Dogs, as well as the voice of Sky in Total Drama.

The sister of actresses Tamara Podemski and Jennifer Podemski, she is of mixed Saulteaux and Polish Jewish ancestry.

Her other noted performances have included the film Empire of Dirt, the television series Cashing In, and The Artshow, a theatrical tribute to artist Daphne Odjig in which she acted alongside Jani Lauzon, Lorne Cardinal, Sean Dixon and Gloria Eshkibok.

She was a winner of the award for Best Supporting Actress at the 2015 American Indian Film Festival for her performance in the film Mekko.

== Filmography ==
=== Film ===
Year	Title	Role	Notes
2009	The Cry of the Owl	Nurse	
2010	Crazytown		
2010	Love Letter from an Open Grave	Nicole	
2013	Empire of Dirt	Charmaine	
2013	Wakening	Wesakechak	
2015	Mekko	Tafv	
2018	Tonight	Woman	
2023	Warrior Strong	Jules	

=== Television ===
Year	Title	Role	Notes
1994	Blauvogel	Malia	13 episodes
1996	Goosebumps	Andy	Episode: "Monster Blood"
2005–2006	Moccasin Flats	Tara	16 episodes
2008	The Border	Sally Doctor	5 episodes
2008	House Party	Megan	6 episodes
2009	Unstable	Markie	Television film
2009	The Family: Inside the Manson Cult	Catherine "Gypsy" Share	Television film
2009	Flashpoint	Tess	Episode: "You Think You Know Someone"
2009	Too Late to Say Goodbye	Marion Barnes	Television film
2009–2014	Cashing In	Cheyenne Blueweed	25 episodes
2012	Murdoch Mysteries	Mrs. Shoucair	Episode: "Murdoch in Toyland"
2012	Covert Affairs	Ilana	Episode: "This Is Not America"
2013	The Listener	Agent Ledford	Episode: "Fatal Vision"
2014	Total Drama: Pahkitew Island	Sky (voice)	Main cast
2015–2016	Between	Ellen	5 episodes
2017	Bull	Wera Harjo	Episode: "Play the Hand You're Dealt"
2017–2019	Tin Star	Denise Minahik	15 episodes
2018	Guilt Free Zone	Carmen Small	Episode: "Finding Derek Miller"
2019	Love Alaska	Maggie Richards	Television film
2021	Hudson & Rex	Lyn O'Connell	Episode: "Manhunt"
2021–2022	Coroner	Kirima Rite	6 episodes
2021–2025	Resident Alien	Kayla	20 episodes
2021–2023	Reservation Dogs	Rita	13 episodes
2023–2024	Spirit Rangers	Otter Woman (voice)	Recurring role
2025	Law and Order Toronto: Criminal Intent	Roxane	Episode: "Digital Lipstick"
