= Sterlin Harjo =

Native American director, producer and screenwriter (born 1979)

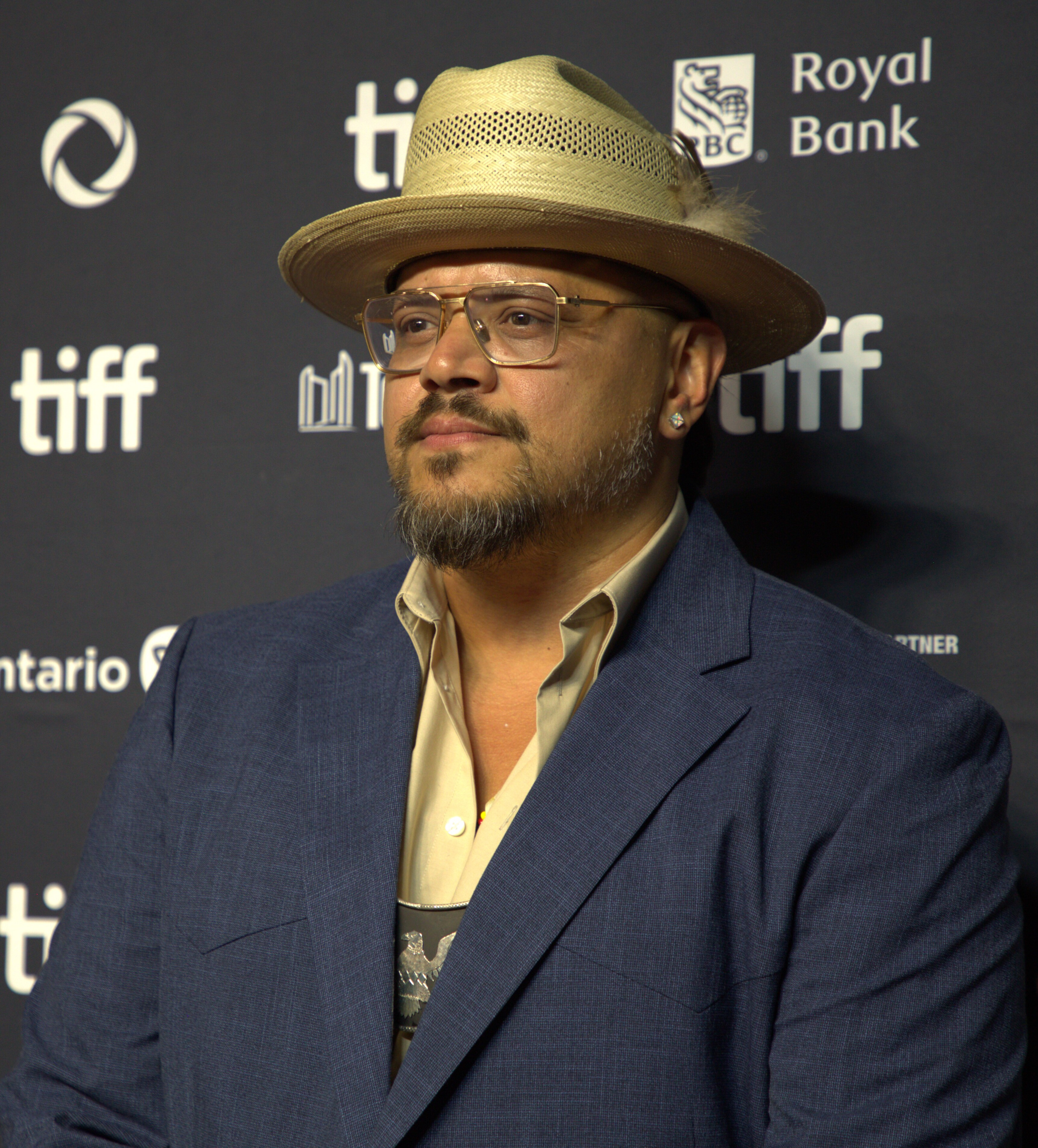
- Harjo at TIFF 2025
- Born: November 14, 1979 (age 46); Holdenville, Oklahoma, U.S.
- Citizenship: Seminole Nation of Oklahoma, American
- Education: University of Oklahoma (BA)
- Occupations: Director; producer; screenwriter
- Years active: 2004–present
- Known for: Reservation Dogs

Sterlin Harjo (born November 14, 1979) is a Native American director, producer and screenwriter from Oklahoma. He is a citizen of the Seminole Nation of Oklahoma and a Muscogee descendant. He has directed three feature films, two documentaries, as well as the FX comedy-drama series Reservation Dogs and The Lowdown, all of them set in his home state of Oklahoma and concerned primarily with Native American and Oklahoman people.

== Early life and education ==
Harjo, a citizen of the Seminole Nation of Oklahoma and a Muscogee descendant, was born and raised in Holdenville, Oklahoma. He studied art and film at the University of Oklahoma.

== Career ==
In 2004, Harjo received a fellowship from the Sundance Institute. His short film Goodnight, Irene premiered at the 2005 Sundance Film Festival and received a special jury award at the Aspen Shortsfest. In 2006, he received a fellowship from the newly formed organization United States Artists.

Harjo's first feature film, Four Sheets to the Wind (2007), tells the story of a young Seminole man who travels from his small hometown to Tulsa, Oklahoma, to visit his sister after the death of their father. The film premiered at the 2007 Sundance Film Festival, where it was nominated for the grand jury prize. Harjo was named best director at the 2007 American Indian Film Festival. The film's co-star Tamara Podemski won a Sundance special jury prize for her performance in the picture, and she was later nominated for best supporting actress at the 2007 Independent Spirit Awards.

Harjo's second feature, Barking Water, premiered at the 2009 Sundance Film Festival. It portrays a road trip by a dying man and his former lover across Oklahoma to see his daughter and granddaughter in Wewoka, Oklahoma, the capital of the Seminole Nation. It was named best drama film at the 2009 American Indian Film Festival.

Harjo's first feature documentary, This May Be the Last Time, is based on the story of his grandfather, who disappeared in 1962 in the Seminole County town of Sasakwa, Oklahoma. It explores the subject of Muscogee Nation hymns and their connection to Scottish folk, gospel, and rock music. The film premiered at the 2014 Sundance Film Festival, and its distribution rights were subsequently acquired by AMC/Sundance Channel Global for the Sundance Channel.

Harjo's third feature film, Mekko, a thriller set in Tulsa, premiered at the Los Angeles Film Festival in June 2015. In 2020, Harjo finished his second feature-length documentary, Love and Fury, which revolves around contemporary Indigenous art and artists, including Micah P. Hinson, Bobby Wilson, Joy Harjo, Tommy Orange, and Black Belt Eagle Scout. It was released by Netflix in December 2021.

Harjo has also directed a number of short-form projects. His 2009 short film, Cepanvkuce Tutcenen, was part of the Embargo Collective project commissioned by the imagineNATIVE Film + Media Arts Festival. He has directed a series of shorts for This Land Press in Tulsa, where he is the staff video director. Harjo was a member of the 2010 Sundance shorts competition jury. He is also a founding member of a five-member Native American skit comedy group, the 1491s, as well as being one of the directors of the Cherokee Nation's monthly television news magazine, Osiyo, Voices of the Cherokee People.

In 2021, FX released the first season of the Indigenous comedy series Reservation Dogs. It is executive-produced, directed, and co-written by Harjo, with Taika Waititi co-writing and executive-producing. On September 2, 2021, FX renewed the series for a second season. In 2022, Reservation Dogs was recognized at the 37th Annual Film Independent Spirit Awards as Best New Scripted Series and Best Ensemble Cast in a New Scripted Series. During the ceremony, actor Devery Jacobs said: "This prize is so much bigger than ourselves, just ourselves. Each of us come from different nations across Turtle Island who survived 500 years of colonization. And in the 100 years of film and TV, Reservation Dogs now marks the first project with all Indigenous creatives at the helm."

In 2023, Harjo directed the music video for the song "Mean Old Sun" by the Oklahoma country rock band Turnpike Troubadours. In 2024, he co-wrote the screenplay for the sports drama Rez Ball with Sydney Freeland, who also directed the film.

In September 2025, FX released Harjo's second series, The Lowdown, starring Ethan Hawke. It is loosely based on historian Lee Roy Chapman, who died in 2015, and his work uncovering and exhibiting Oklahoma history.

== Awards ==
Harjo was awarded the 2011 Tilghman Award from the Oklahoma Film Critics Circle and the Tulsa Library Trust's 2013 American Indian Writers Award. He also received a 2021 Peabody Award for Reservation Dogs. In 2024, Harjo was named a MacArthur Fellow, the only filmmaker in the group.

== Filmography ==
- Goodnight, Irene (short, 2005)
- Four Sheets to the Wind – director, writer (2007)
- Barking Water – director, writer (2009)
- Cepanvkuce Tutcenen (short, 2009)
- This May Be the Last Time – director, writer, producer (documentary, 2014)
- Mekko – director, writer (2015)
- Love and Fury – director, producer, editor, cinematographer (documentary, 2020)
- Reservation Dogs – co-creator, co-director (TV series, 2021–2023)
- Rez Ball – screenwriter (2024)
- The Lowdown – creator, writer, director, executive producer (TV series, 2025–present)
