= House Made of Bongs =

- Reservation Dogs episode
- The primary guest stars of the episode along with Josiah Wesley Jones as Young Fixico.
- Episode no.: Season 3 Episode 5
- Directed by: Blackhorse Lowe
- Written by: Tommy Pico and Sterlin Harjo
- Cinematography by: Mark Schwartzbard
- Editing by: Varun Viswanath
- Production code: XRDV3005
- Original air date: August 23, 2023
- Running time: 27 minutes

Guest appearances
- Issac Arellanes as Young Maximus; Mato Wayuhi as Young Bucky; Shelby Factor as Young Mabel; Quannah Chasinghorse as Young Irene; Nathan Alexis as Young Brownie

Episode chronology
← Previous "Friday"	Next → "Frankfurter Sandwich"

"House Made of Bongs" is the fifth episode of the third and final season of the comedy and teen drama television series Reservation Dogs. The episode was released on FX on Hulu on August 23, 2023. It is the twenty-third episode overall; it was directed by Blackhorse Lowe and written by Tommy Pico and Sterlin Harjo. The episode takes place in 1976 and features no appearances by the main cast. In the episode, a group of students at a boarding school on an Indian reservation attend a party where they prepare for their futures. Inspiration for the episode was taken from films written and directed by Richard Linklater and Steven Spielberg, as well as other 1970s films. Several songs from the 1960s and 1970s were featured. "House Made of Bongs" received positive reviews from critics and received a Writers Guild of America Award nomination.

== Plot ==
In 1976 in Okern, Maximus, Brownie, Bucky, Irene, and Mabel are students at the same Native American boarding school where the spirit Deer Lady and her friends were abused and assimilated into white culture as children some years earlier. (Note: As depicted in "Deer Lady") However, it has since been modernized and is more like a regular boarding school; there are now Indian teachers and there are sports teams called "Chieftains" (with an Indian mascot). It is the end of the school year. Maximus (who prefers to be called Cvpon) is filming his friends, making home movies. (Note: As shown in "Maximus") They go to a party by a lake where they smoke marijuana, drink, and take LSD. They talk about what they want for their older selves. Maximus has never taken LSD before and is experiencing a very altered state of reality. Fixico arrives and is very popular. He has recently begun his training as a medicine man (or spiritual healer), which makes Maximus jealous. Fixico tries to reconcile with Maximus but fails. Driving home, Maximus witnesses an extraterrestrial spaceship land and talks with the occupants, but his friends refuse to believe him.

== Production ==
The episode was directed by Blackhorse Lowe and written by Tommy Pico and Sterlin Harjo. None of the main cast appeared in the episode; it instead primarily features five guest stars (Isaac Arellanes, Mato Wayuhi, Shelby Factor, Quannah Chasinghorse, and Nathan Alexis) who portray the younger version of characters who have previously recurred throughout the series. The five appeared as Maximus, Bucky, Mabel, Irene, and Brownie, respectively. Factor and Alexis are siblings of series regulars Lane Factor and Paulina Alexis who portray Cheese and Willie Jack. Lowe compared the script to the film Dazed and Confused and stated that his inspiration was taken from Steven Spielberg-directed films such as Close Encounters of the Third Kind and E.T. the Extra-Terrestrial.

"House Made of Bongs" is set in the year 1976. The episode forms a loose story arc with the following episode, "Frankfurter Sandwich", which heavily focuses on many of the same characters in their adult life in 2023; it was also directed by Lowe and co-written by Harjo. Cast and crew members screened Two-Lane Blacktop, Vanishing Point, and Husbands with Lowe at Circle Cinema in Tulsa, Oklahoma before filming on the two episodes commenced. "Frankfurter Sandwich" was also filmed before "House Made of Bongs" in production order. Lowe also said they attempted to use as many special effects as they could in-camera rather than add them in post production. Featured music from the 1960s and 1970s included songs such as "I'm on Fire" by the Dwight Twilley Band, "Jailbreak"by Thin Lizzy, and "Call Me the Breeze" by J.J. Cale, as well as those from other artists including 13th Floor Elevators, Fanny, and Ultimate Spinach.

== Release and reception ==
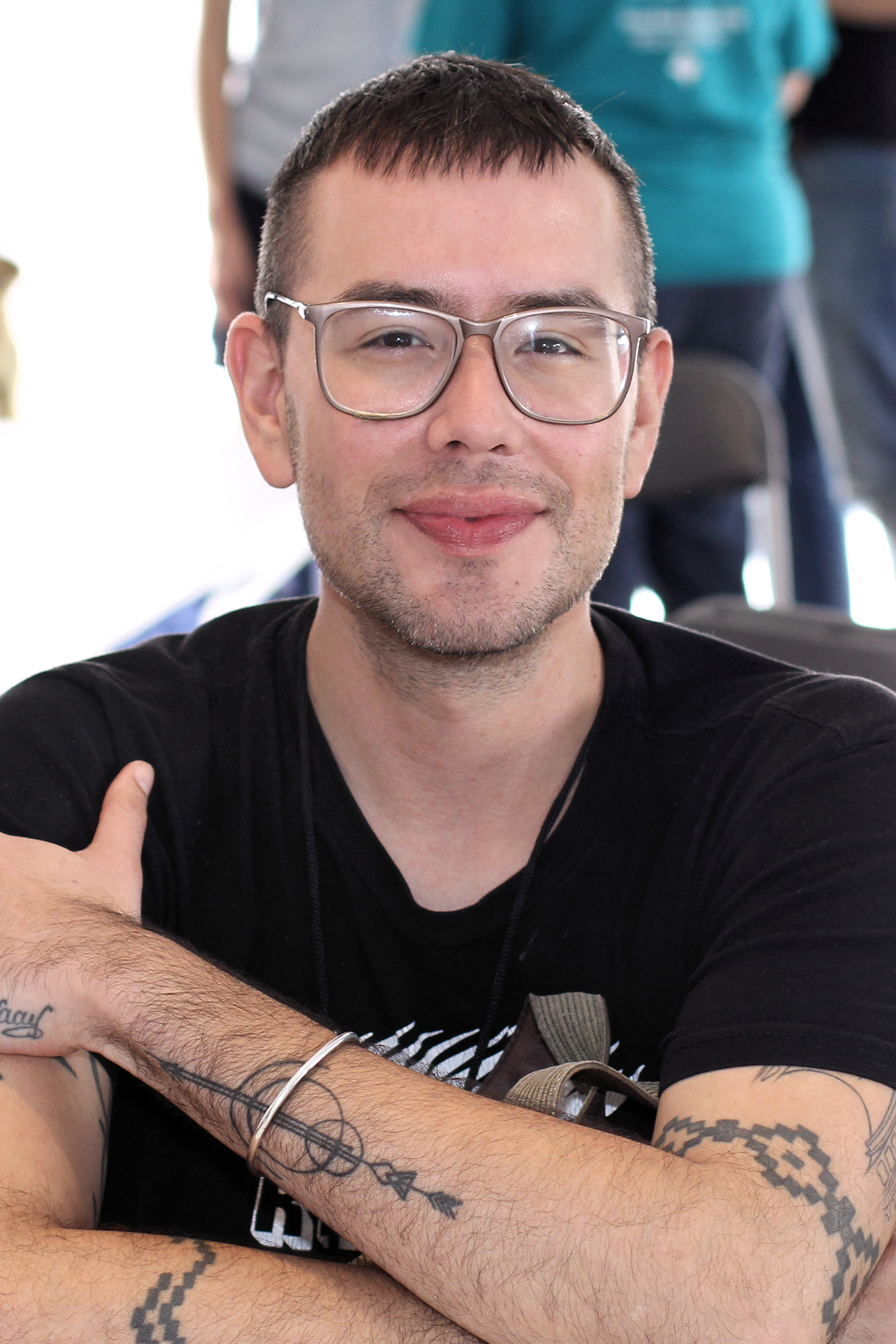
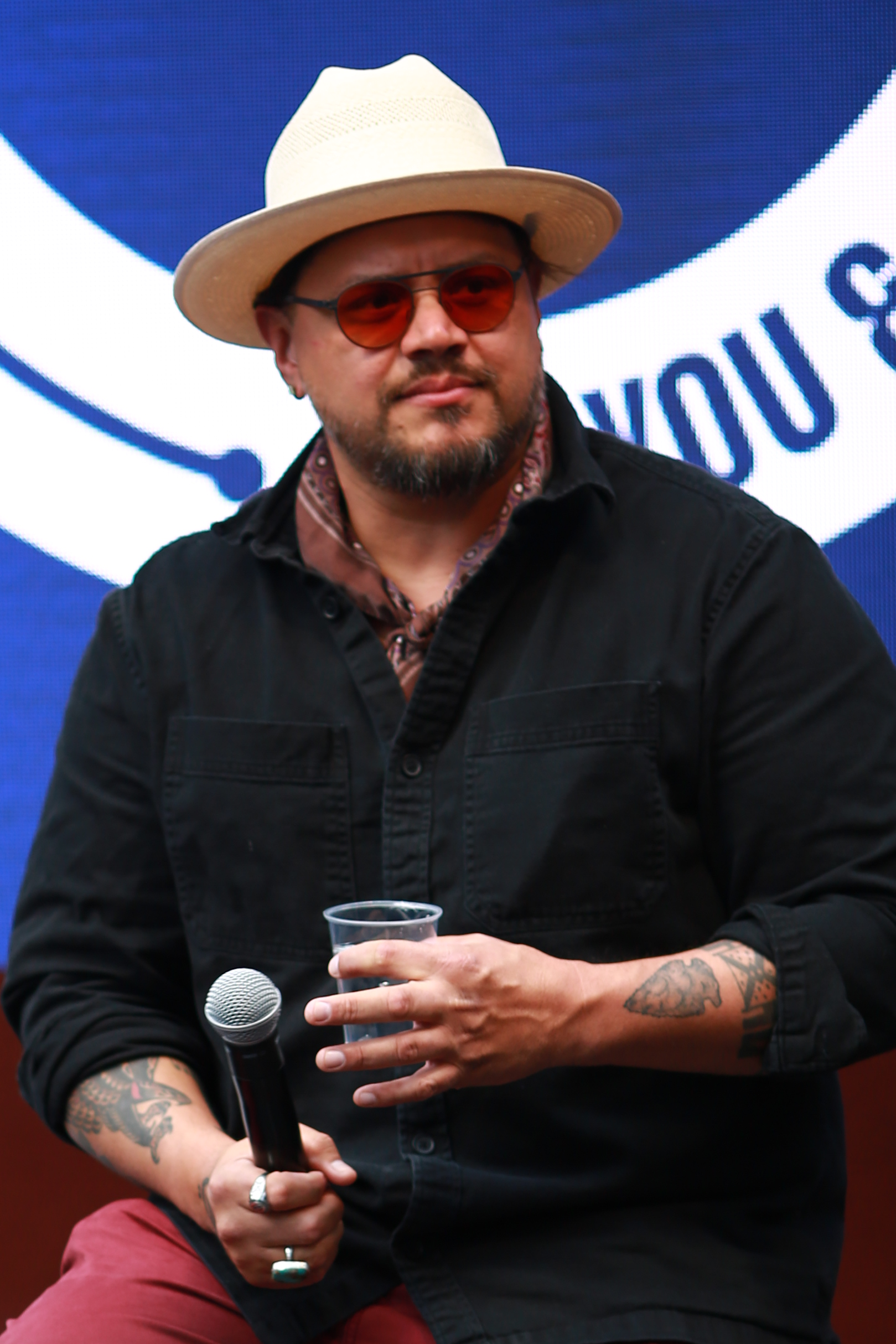
Pico (left) and Harjo (right) were nominated for a Writers Guild of America Award for their contributions to the episode.

"House Made of Bongs" was released on Hulu on August 23, 2023, under their FX on Hulu content hub. Reviewing for The A.V. Club, Manuel Betancourt stated that the episode allowed Reservation Dogs to "offer a much more robust vision of Native life over the decades" and noted the comparisons to the film Dazed and Confused. Betancourt also opines that the episode is one of the funniest in the third season and most inventive in the series overall. Den of Geek writer Alec Bojaland also mentioned the similarities and said that the episode was "quixotically moving in the strangest way." Bojaland later noted how the "tragic" ending up the episode was progressed in the following episode, "Frankfurter Sandwich".

Kali Simmons with Vulture notes that "House Made of Bongs" allowed viewers to see the similarities between Maximus and Bear (one of the characters followed in a traditional episode). TV Insider's Megan Darwish wrote that the younger actors "seemingly encapsulate their older counterparts with pitch-perfect performances". Alan Sepinwall, writing for Rolling Stone, mentions the contrast of the scenes set at the school compared to the modernized version seen in the present-day set episodes and its state as a place of cultural assimilation that was seen two episodes earlier in "Deer Lady". Pico and Harjo were nominated in the episodic comedy category for their work on the episode at the 2024 Writers Guild of America Awards.
