= Lane Factor =

Native American actor

- Born: June 28, 2005 (age 21); Midwest City, Oklahoma, U.S.
- Citizenship: Caddo Nation of Oklahoma, American
- Occupation: Actor
- Years active: 2020–present

Lane Factor (born June 28, 2005) is a Native American actor who is Seminole, Muscogee, and Caddo. He is best known for breakthrough role as Indigenous teenager Chester "Cheese" Williams in the FX on Hulu comedy-drama series Reservation Dogs (2021–2023). He won the Independent Spirit Award for Best Ensemble Cast in a New Scripted Series in 2022, the same year the series won a Peabody Award.

He is also known for appearing in the 2022 Steven Spielberg coming-of-age drama film The Fabelmans.

== Early life ==
Factor is a citizen of the Caddo Nation of Oklahoma and of Muscogee and Seminole descent. He was born in Midwest City, Oklahoma. His mother, Kelly Factor, is vice chairwoman of the Caddo Nation.

Factor took an interest in acting at a young age, having been enrolled at the Freihofer Actor Factory in Norman, Oklahoma during his youth.

== Career ==
Factor began his career acting in local commercials.

From 2021 to 2023, he played his first major role on the acclaimed FX on Hulu TV series Reservation Dogs about a group of Indigenous teenagers growing up on a reservation in rural Oklahoma. He starred in the main cast alongside D'Pharaoh Woon-A-Tai, Devery Jacobs, and Paulina Alexis. The youngest of the four, Factor experienced his coming-of-age with his fictional character, having stated "In between the pilot and Season 1 there was a six-month gap, and my voice changed, and I got really tall. So they had to try to pitch my voice a bit so it wouldn’t sound so different. I’ve literally grown with the show."

In August 2021 it was announced that Factor would be joining Steven Spielberg's The Fabelmans alongside Michelle Williams, Paul Dano, Gabriel LaBelle, Seth Rogen, and Judd Hirsch.

== Filmography ==
=== Film ===
Filmography: Film
Year	Title	Role	Director(s)	Ref.
2022	The Fabelmans	Dean	Steven Spielberg	
2025	Keep Quiet	Albert	Vincent Grashaw	

=== Television ===
Filmography: Television
Year	Title	Role	Notes	Ref.
2021–2023	Reservation Dogs	Chester "Cheese" Williams	Main role	
2022	Shoresy	Soo Hockey Player (uncredited)	Episode: "Don't Poke the Bear"	
2025	Star Wars: Tales of the Underworld	Lyco Strata	3 episodes (mini-series)	

== Awards and nominations ==
Year	Award	Category	Work	Result	Ref.
2022	37th Independent Spirit Awards	Best Ensemble Cast in a New Scripted Series (Shared with the cast)	Reservation Dogs	Won	
2022	Pena de Prata	Best Ensemble in a Comedy Series (Shared with the cast)	Reservation Dogs	Won	
2022	Red Nation Film Festival	Outstanding Lead Actor in a Drama, Comedy, Limited Series	Reservation Dogs	Nominated	
2022	Peabody Awards	Entertainment (Shared with cast and crew)	Reservation Dogs	Won	
2023	Peabody Awards	Entertainment (Shared with cast and crew)	Reservation Dogs	Nominated	
2024	Gold Derby Awards	Comedy Supporting Actor	Reservation Dogs	Nominated	
