= Reservation Dogs =

2021 Native American comedy-drama television series

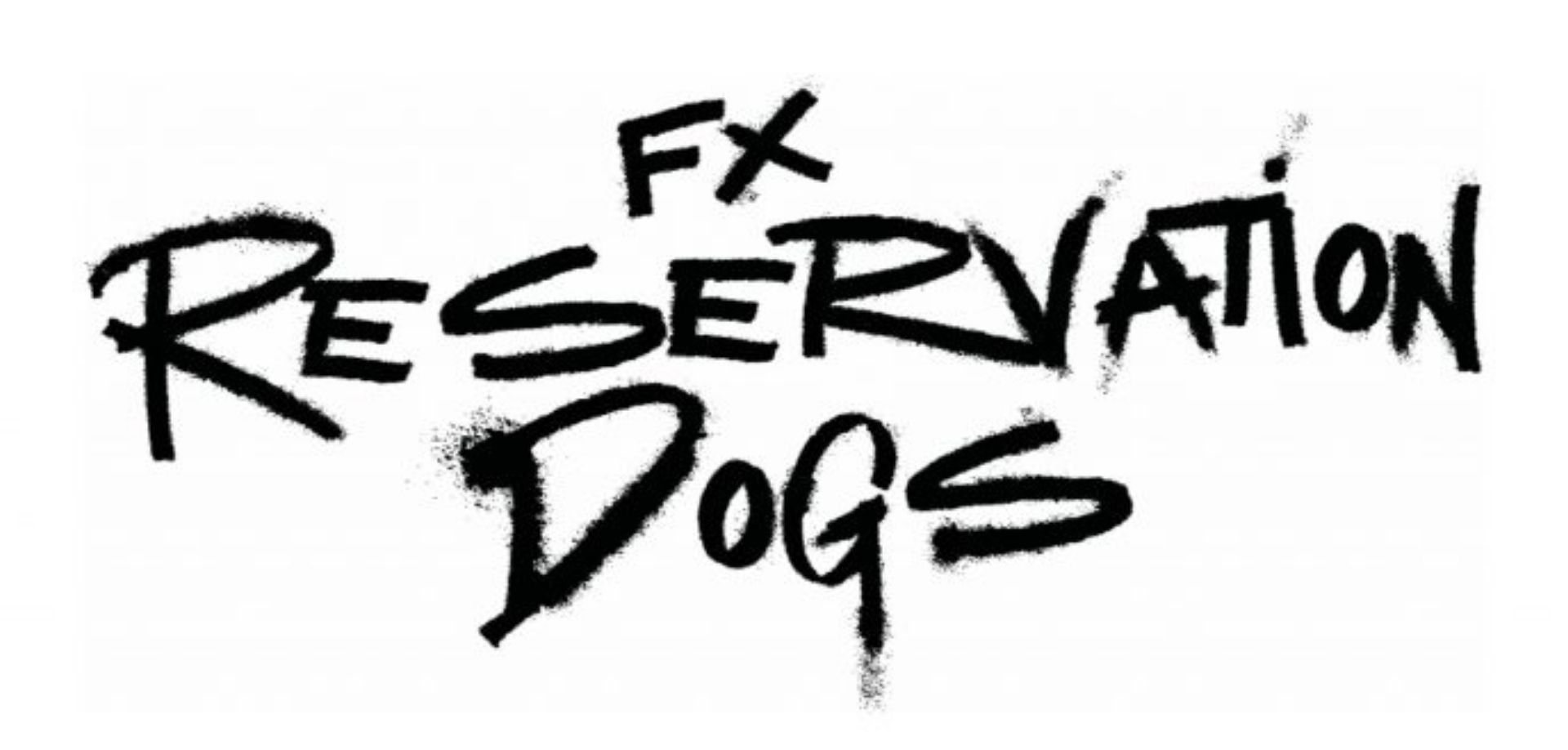
- Genre: Teen drama; Comedy drama
- Created by: Sterlin Harjo; Taika Waititi
- Showrunner: Sterlin Harjo
- Starring: Devery Jacobs; D'Pharaoh Woon-A-Tai; Lane Factor; Paulina Alexis
- Composer: Mato Wayuhi
- Country of origin: United States
- Original language: English
- No. of seasons: 3
- No. of episodes: 28

Production
- Executive producers: Sterlin Harjo; Taika Waititi; Garrett Basch
- Producer: Kathryn Dean
- Production location: Oklahoma
- Cinematography: Mark Schwartzbard; Christian Sprenger
- Camera setup: Single-camera
- Running time: 22–38 minutes
- Production companies: Waititi; Crazy Eagle Media; Dive; FXP

Original release
- Network: FX on Hulu
- Release: August 9, 2021 – September 27, 2023

Related
- The Lowdown

Reservation Dogs is a Native American comedy drama television series created by Sterlin Harjo and Taika Waititi for FX Productions. It follows the lives of Indigenous teenagers living in rural Oklahoma, as they navigate adolescence while balancing their heritage with their desire to escape the confines of life on the reservation. It was renewed for a second season in 2021 and a third and final season in 2022, which premiered on August 2, 2023. The series concluded on September 27, 2023.

It is the first American series to feature all-Native American writers and directors, along with an almost entirely Indigenous North American cast and crew. The initial season was filmed entirely in Oklahoma, marking a historic first for a scripted series. The series premiered on Hulu under FX on Hulu branding on August 9, 2021 (International Day of the World's Indigenous Peoples).

Reservation Dogs received widespread critical acclaim and numerous accolades, including two Peabody Awards and two Independent Spirit Awards. It was nominated for five Primetime Emmy Awards (including Outstanding Comedy Series and Outstanding Lead Actor in a Comedy Series for D'Pharaoh Woon-A-Tai), one Golden Globe, six Television Critics Association Awards, and nine Critics' Choice Television Awards. Additionally, it was consecutively listed as one of the ten best television programs by the American Film Institute in 2021, 2022, and 2023.

== Premise ==
The series follows the lives of four Indigenous teenagers (the Rez Dogs) in rural Oklahoma, in a small town in the Muscogee Nation, where they spend their days "committing crime and fighting it." Their friend Daniel, who dreamed of moving to California, died one year before the events of the show. As the Rez Dogs grapple with his death, they contemplate whether to make the trip to California themselves. They each need to address unresolved issues in their lives and community and make plans to leave.

In Season 2, the Rez Dogs are still experiencing grief over Daniel's death and have lost some of their connection to each other. The "California dream" does not turn out as they expected, resulting in more feelings of disappointment and abandonment. They cope using humor but also increasingly face adult challenges. Financial and family responsibilities arise as they continue to try to figure out their lives.

Season 3 explores the history of the elders in the community and how the events and choices of their youth led to their present day lives. Parallels are drawn between the Rez Dogs and the younger selves of the aunts, uncles and grandparents.

== Cast and characters ==
=== Main ===
- Devery Jacobs (Kahnawà:ke Mohawk) as Elora Danan Postoak. Named for the Willow character, she is the most responsible and driven member of the gang. Elora lost her mother when she was still a toddler.
- D'Pharaoh Woon-A-Tai (Oji-Cree) as Bear Smallhill. He grew up with only his mother parenting him and is still very close to her. He longs for a relationship with his estranged, deadbeat dad. Bear experiences visions of a spirit guide.
- Lane Factor (Caddo/Seminole/Muscogee) as Chester "Cheese" Williams. More laid back than Elora or Bear, he rolls with the flow of whatever mischief or misadventure comes his way. He lives with his "cousin uncle", Charley; Cheese tends to connect with various adult characters in the show.
- Paulina Alexis (Alexis Nakota) as Wilhelmina Jacqueline "Willie Jack" Sampson. She is very close with her parents. Daniel was Willie Jack's cousin and she is strongly affected by his death.

=== Recurring ===
- Sarah Podemski (Muscowpetung Saulteaux descent) as Rita, Bear's mother. A devoted single parent, Rita works at the local Indian Health Service (IHS) clinic and frequently fields advances from male admirers. She is determined to find a man who can be a better father figure to Bear than Punkin.
- Zahn McClarnon (Standing Rock Lakota, Standing Rock Sioux Tribe of North & South Dakota,) as Officer Big; a lighthorseman known for his patience with petty criminals as well as for his superstitious nature.
- Dallas Goldtooth (Mdewakanton Dakota/Diné) as William "Spirit" Knifeman; a self-proclaimed warrior who died at The Battle of Little Big Horn, even though he did not do any fighting; he has been sent to act as a guide to Bear. In season 2 he also appears to Uncle Brownie.
- Gary Farmer (Grand River Cayuga) as Uncle Brownie, Elora's uncle. While the bar fights of his past are legendary, he now lives in the woods as a hermit. Part of the 1976 friend group, when he spoke of wanting to one day open a dojo.
- Elva Guerra (Ponca/Mexican-American) as Jackie, leader of the NDN mafia; she grew up in the city and wants to return to urban life. She and Elora bond during their first attempt to reach California. She also lost her brother to suicide.
- Jesus "Lil Mike" Silva II (Pawnee/Choctaw) as Mose, half of a local rap duo along with his brother; they ride around the community on their bikes or kick scooters, keeping track of local gossip and commenting on events.
- Jesus "Funny Bone" Silva IV (Pawnee/Choctaw) as Mekko, the other half of the local rap duo.
- Jack Maricle as White Steve, member of the NDN mafia.
- Jude Barnett as Bone Thug Dog, member of the NDN mafia.
- Xavier Bigpond as Weeze, member of the NDN mafia.
- Dalton Cramer (Seminole Nation) as Daniel, Willie Jack's late cousin and friend of the Rez Dogs, who died by suicide a year before the start of the show. He appears occasionally in dreams and flashbacks. He wanted to go to California, a dream that the Rez Dogs try to fulfill in his honor. He had a secret crush on Elora.
- Bobby Lee as Dr. Kang, the primary physician at the tribal clinic.
- Kirk Fox as Kenny Boy, owner of the local salvage yard; constantly trying to convince people he is Native American, interspersing his speech with mispronounced and misunderstood words and concepts in Navajo, Lakota, and Ojibwe, much to the annoyance of actual Natives.
- Matty Cardarople as Ansel, a worker at the local salvage yard.
- Jon Proudstar (Pascua Yaqui) as Leon, Willie Jack's father.
- Kimberly Guerrero (Colville with Salish-Kootenai heritage) as Auntie B, Willie Jack's aunt, a paranoid beadworker.
- Jana Schmieding (Cheyenne River Lakota) as Bev, the clinic receptionist and Jackie's aunt.
- Casey Camp-Horinek (Ponca) as Irene, the grandmother Cheese meets at the clinic. She later becomes his foster parent. In the 1976 friend group at high school, she is a budding activist who wants to join AIM.
- Kaniehtiio "Tiio" Horn (Kahnawà:ke Mohawk) as Deer Lady, a mythical being in the form of a beautiful woman with deer hooves.
- Geraldine Keams (Diné) as Mabel, Elora's grandmother. In the 1976 friend group, she says she wants to have lots of babies. Maximus and Fixico had a falling out in 1976, partially over a love triangle with Mabel.
- Jennifer Podemski (Muscowpetung Saulteaux descent) as Dana, Willie Jack's mom.
- Tamara Podemski (Muscowpetung Saulteaux descent) as Teenie, Elora's aunt. She is Mabel's daughter and Cookie's sister.
- JaNae Collins (Fort Peck Dakota/Crow) as Cookie, Elora's mom and close friend of the Aunties and Big. She died when Elora was very young, but is seen in flashbacks; in season 3 she returns as a spirit, but only Rita can see her.
- Wes Studi (Cherokee Nation) as Bucky, an eccentric local artist; part of the 1976 friend group at boarding school.
- Richard Ray Whitman (Muscogee/Yuchi) as Old Man Fixico.
- Bobby Wilson (Sisseton Wahpeton Dakota)) as Jumbo, who works at the weed dispensary.
- Migizi Pensoneau (Ponca/Ojibwe) as Ray Ray, Jumbo's good friend.
- Warren Queton (Kiowa/Cherokee/Seminole) as Clinton, Rita's boss at the IHS Clinic.
- Nathan Apodaca (Northern Arapaho/Mexican-American), as Uncle Charley, the "cousin uncle" Cheese lives with who is arrested in season 2.
- Nathalie Standingcloud (Cherokee Nation/Muscogee/Salish) as Natalie, an ophthalmologist that works at the clinic, and one of the Aunties.
- Macon Blair as Rob.
- Darryl W. Handy as Cleo.
- Rhomeyn Johnson as Miles.

=== Guest ===
- Garrett Hedlund as David.
- Lily Gladstone (Piegan Blackfeet/Nez Perce) as Hokti, Daniel's mom and Willie Jack's auntie, a medicine woman who is currently in prison.
- Graham Greene (Oneida) as Maximus, an eccentric recluse who sees spirits and is waiting for the return of the Star People; in the 1970s, lived on the Oklahoma reservation, attended the same residential school as Deer Woman had in a previous era, and had a friend group similar to the current Rez Dogs.
- Evan Adams (Coast Salish) as Larry, the IHS mental health therapist, who interrupts, talks over, and dumps his own trauma on clients.
- Tafv Sampson (Mvskoke) as Gram, an ancestor of Willie Jack and Hokti, who now watches and helps them as a spirit. She walked the Trail of Tears and, in the afterlife, is in a "hot sexual relationship" with William Knifeman.
- Sten Joddi (Mvskoke) as Punkin Lusty, Bear's estranged father, a rapper living in California.
- Bill Burr as Garrett Bobson, Elora's former basketball coach and driving instructor.
- Brandon Boyd as White Jesus of Los Angeles.
- Amber Midthunder (of Hunkpapa Lakota, Sisseton Dakota and Sahiyaiyeskabi Assiniboine descent; citizen of the Fort Peck Indian Reservation) as MissMa8riarch, alleged online influencer, youth seminar leader; claims to be many things.
- Quannah Chasinghorse (Sicangu Lakota/Hän Gwich'in) as the 1976 version of Irene, Cheese's adopted grandmother.
- Elisha Pratt as Augusto Firekeeper, self-described "actor, model, poet, hatmaker", etc.
- Joy Harjo (Mvskoke) as manager of the convenience store where Elora works.
- Megan Mullally as Anna.
- Michael Spears (Kul Wičaša Lakota) as Danny, Daniel's father.
- Marc Maron as Gene, head of a foster home, who "spends his days harassing and trauma-dumping on Native youth."
- Ryan RedCorn (Osage Nation) as Olf, "a Comanche-Ponca Juggalo" on the bus trip from California to Oklahoma.
- Keland Lee Bearpaw as Danny Bighead.
- Tim Cappello as a sax player on the beach in Los Angeles.
- Ethan Hawke as Rick, Elora's father.
- DeLanna Studi (Cherokee) as Jackie's mother.
- Angus Sampson as a chemist in Kenny Boy's crew.

== Episodes ==
Season	Episodes	Originally released	
Season	Episodes	First released	Last released
1	8	August 9, 2021	September 20, 2021
2	10	August 3, 2022	September 28, 2022
3	10	August 2, 2023	September 27, 2023

=== Season 1 (2021) ===
No. overall	No. in season	Title	Directed by	Written by	Original release date	Prod. code
1	1	"F*ckin' Rez Dogs"	Sterlin Harjo	Sterlin Harjo & Taika Waititi	August 9, 2021	101
Elora Danan, Bear, Willie Jack, and Cheese (the Rez Dogs) steal a delivery truck and sell it. They are trying to raise money to leave their small reservation community and escape to California. They are mourning their friend Daniel who died a year earlier and hold a small memorial for him. When a car full of teenagers (the NDN Mafia) drives by and shoots paintballs at the Rez Dogs, Bear faints and encounters an Indigenous spirit on a horse, William Knifeman (who died awkwardly at the Battle of the Little Bighorn), who attempts to give him life advice.
2	2	"NDN Clinic"	Sydney Freeland	Sterlin Harjo	August 9, 2021	102
Bear gets beaten up by the NDN Mafia, necessitating a visit to the local IHS clinic. Elora and Willie Jack set up a table outside the clinic to sell meat pies next to Old Man Fixico, who is selling traditional medicines. Cheese is kind to an old woman, Irene, who thinks he is her grandson. William Knifeman, the spirit guide, has issues. The local doctor flirts with Bear's mom, who works at the clinic.
3	3	"Uncle Brownie"	Blackhorse Lowe	Sterlin Harjo	August 16, 2021	103
Still concerned about the attacks by the NDN Mafia, the Rez Dogs go to find Elora's uncle, Brownie, to see if he will teach them to fight. Brownie is infamous for having knocked out numerous people in a bar fight. They spend the day trying to help Brownie sell his ancient marijuana, and learn "Indigenous-style" about his ways of fighting.
4	4	"What About Your Dad"	Sydney Freeland	Bobby Wilson & Tommy Pico	August 23, 2021	104
Bear's dad, a rapper who goes by the name Punkin Lusty, is hired to perform at the local IHS clinic's Diabetes Awareness Frybread Feast. Clinton is obsessed with Punkin's frybread song and will not stop singing it. Bear spends the California fund buying him a gift made by Auntie B—a beaded medallion of a microphone that strongly resembles a penis. As Rita sadly expects, Punkin calls Bear the day of the show and cancels. Elora is approached by Jackie, leader of the NDN Mafia, about joining their gang. After Bear spends the fund, Elora starts to consider Jackie's offer.
5	5	"Come and Get Your Love"	Blackhorse Lowe	Sterlin Harjo	August 30, 2021	105
Cheese spends a day on a ride-along with Big. Along the way, they meet Bucky, who makes sculptures from stolen copper. Big gets teased by the white police officers. The NDN Mafia get busted for stealing a car. Big tells Cheese why he became a cop, which involves events in his childhood and encounters with the Deer Lady, who has been a presence in his life since he was a child.
6	6	"Hunting"	Sterlin Harjo	Sterlin Harjo	September 6, 2021	107
Willie Jack and her father, Leon, get up early and go hunting. They spend a day in the woods together, hunting deer and grappling with their grief over the death of Daniel a year earlier.
7	7	"California Dreamin'"	Tazbah Chavez	Tazbah Chavez	September 13, 2021	106
Elora takes her driver's test, after three previous failures. Her instructor turns out to be her former basketball coach. Instead of completing the test, her instructor takes her on a wild ride. She drives them away from a shootout in which he was involved. He reveals that he was friends with Elora's parents, and tells Elora that her mother gave him an Indian name. He reveals more details of Cookie's death, and they both mourn her. In gratitude, Elora tells him what his "Indian name" means. In a flashback, we see Daniel with the Rez Dogs and discover how he died.
8	8	"Satvrday"	Sterlin Harjo	Migizi Pensoneau	September 20, 2021	108
As the Rez Dogs prepare to leave for California, a tornado approaches. Most of the community takes shelter in the church basement, but Uncle Brownie rides through the streets, looking for the right tools to divert the tornado. Bear's guiding spirit, William Knifeman, appears again, to ask Bear whether he has completed all the tasks he needs to before leaving town. Together in the church, members of the community, including the Rez Dogs and the NDN Mafia, talk to each other and make key decisions about their future.

=== Season 2 (2022) ===
No. overall	No. in season	Title	Directed by	Written by	Original release date	Prod. code
9	1	"The Curse"	Sterlin Harjo	Sterlin Harjo & Dallas Goldtooth & Ryan RedCorn	August 3, 2022	201
The gang is scattered, with Elora and Jackie on the road to California and the others in various places around the reservation. Willie Jack blames herself for their troubles because she gave Jackie's hair to a white man in a bar so that he could put a curse on Jackie. Uncle Brownie and others tell her that she used bad medicine and it has come back on her, bringing them all misfortune. She and Cheese set out to gather the items and knowledge to reverse the curse. Uncle Brownie has been changed by the tornado ceremony. For a while he wanders naked, thinking he's an invisible spirit or a holy man, because he can see William "Spirit" Knifeman. Knifeman tells him that he is not a holy man. Elora and Jackie break down on the side of the road and catch a ride with a creepy traveling salesman. After he turns onto a dirt road, the frightened girls attack him and get away but leave their bags and money in his car. They try to steal a vehicle from a homestead and get chased by gun-waving rednecks in a truck.
10	2	"Run"	Sterlin Harjo	Sterlin Harjo & Dallas Goldtooth & Ryan RedCorn	August 3, 2022	202
Elora and Jackie narrowly escape being caught by the rednecks and continue on their way. They are spotted by a friendly white woman, who invites them to her house, feeds them and puts them up for the night. After nightfall the girls steal her truck and head home. Back on the reservation, Willie Jack manages to obtain several items that belonged to Jackie and she, Cheese, Uncle Brownie, and Bucky head down to the river to break free of the curse. William Knifeman (only visible to Uncle Brownie) arrives to sing with them, then announces that they have vanquished the curse, as long as they treat each other well in the future. Bear skulks around town, trying to find a job.
11	3	"Roofing"	Erica Tremblay	Sterlin Harjo & Chad Charlie	August 10, 2022	203
Bear gets a job working on a small roofing crew with three other men and is surprised to find out that Daniel's father is one of the crew. The workers tease him but he eventually shares an intimate conversation with Daniel's father, who is also full of regret and shame about Daniel's death. Bear is proud to be able to help his mother pay the bills. Elora comes to Bear's window in tears, saying that her grandmother is dying.
12	4	"Mabel"	Danis Goulet	Sterlin Harjo & Kawennáhere Devery Jacobs	August 17, 2022	204
Elora's grandmother, Mabel, is dying. Friends and relatives gather at her bedside to pray and sing in Mvskoke, conduct ceremony, and offer support to Elora. Jackie comes, awkwardly negotiating a setting where she feels unwelcome. Elora's aunt and her friends reminisce about Elora's mother, Cookie, and how their friend group scattered and their lives changed forever after her death. At Elora's request, Cheese leads a prayer. William "Spirit" Knifeman shows up to eat the spirit offerings and wait for Mabel to die so he can take her to "orientation". After Mabel dies, Elora sees her as a spirit.
13	5	"Wide Net"	Tazbah Chavez	Tazbah Chavez	August 24, 2022	205
The Aunties, (lifelong friends Bev, Natalie, Rita, and Teenie) go on "the closest thing to a vacation" they get—a wild trip to the yearly Indian Health Service (IHS) conference, where they meet up with Natives from all over the country. They party and set out to make sexual conquests, with variable results. In a flashback, we see them as girls together, before Cookie died, learning a dance they try to recreate on the dance floor at the conference. With his mother out of town, Bear throws a party at home.
14	6	"Decolonativization"	Tazbah Chavez	Erica Tremblay	August 31, 2022	206
As punishment for throwing the party, Bear's mother makes him attend the Native American Reclamation and Decolonization Symposium Youth Summit (NARDS) at the IHS Clinic. Clinton has hired two online influencers—young people who proceed to talk about themselves, claiming to be a "Young Elder" and a "Matriarch". The duo's claims and mismatched regalia elicit a skeptical response from the audience, many of whom leave. Those who stay—mostly hoping to get free food—are led through exercises that the "influencers" claim are traditional or acts of "decolonization". The exercises resemble corporate-retreat trust-building activities. Bear reaches out to Elora but is disappointed when he sees her with Jackie. Willie Jack continues to reject Jackie, often in painful, personal ways. Other members of the NDN Mafia participate more enthusiastically in the symposium, even pairing with members of the Rez Dogs in trust-building exercises. Bear and Elora grow even more distant.
15	7	"Stay Gold Cheesy Boy"	Blackhorse Lowe	Bobby Wilson	September 7, 2022	207
Cheese and Charley are arrested in a raid by Oklahoma Highway Patrol. Cheese does not know why, but the police find cannabis plants in the house. Until his guardianship can be determined, Cheese is sent to a group home run by Gene, who is "awkward, self-centered, incompetent, and, most troubling for Cheese, dedicated to an addiction-recovery plan that involves appropriating random Native American spiritual and cultural practices." Gene forces the Native and Black youth to attend "recovery" circles, despite the fact that, unlike Gene, they are not addicts. Although the environment is stressful and oppressive, Cheese bonds with the other youth, talking openly for the first time about his relationship with Daniel. Jackie, who witnessed the arrests, puts aside her shyness and hurt and goes to tell the Rez Dogs. United in the face of crisis, they come up with a plan to free Cheese. Big arrives to free him from the group home and Irene, the elder he met at the clinic, takes him in as her adopted grandson. Cheese's friends, including Jackie, welcome him home.
16	8	"This is Where the Plot Thickens"	Blackhorse Lowe	Blackhorse Lowe & Sterlin Harjo	September 14, 2022	208
Lighthorseman Big is dispatched to investigate a stolen shipment of catfish. He argues that he should instead investigate a recent bigfoot sighting, but complies with orders and heads to the salvage yard to check on the "methheads" there. Big mistakenly drinks a soda that is laced with strong psychedelics. He has never done drugs and is wracked with guilt. He has vivid hallucinations and re-experiences the traumatic memory of Cookie's death, for which he blames himself. Despite finding Kenny Boy deeply irritating, Big winds up having to rely on him for support, as Kenny is experienced with hallucinogens. They stumble upon masked and robed white supremacists doing a grotesque ritual in the forest, involving a giant owl effigy and sexual penetration of decapitated catfish, while chanting that they are the true owners of Native land. Big and Kenny attempt to arrest them but are assaulted and held captive. Deer Lady arrives and frees them, enabling Big to call for backup. The obscene Catfish cult – which includes the Governor of Oklahoma and other powerful local men – is arrested and exposed in the media. While Big still finds Kenny embarrassing, they form an awkward bond. During the closing credits, a bigfoot meanders across the screen, but an exhausted Big does not notice.
17	9	"Offerings"	Sterlin Harjo	Migizi Pensoneau	September 21, 2022	209
Willie Jack and Bear will soon graduate from high school. Their teacher gives the class letters that they wrote to their future selves when they were freshmen, giving Daniel's letter to Willie Jack. She feels that the Rez Dogs are "in darkness" and not connecting with one another, and seeks advice from Daniel's mother, her auntie Hokti who is in prison. Hokti is a medicine woman who has been neglecting her practice while a cheerful and chatty ancestral spirit, Gram, pesters her to resume. Hokti is bitter, and reluctant to see Willie Jack, who reminds her of Daniel. Eventually she agrees to pray with Willie Jack, and a large group of ancestral spirits appear and gather around them. Willie Jack feels their presence, crying with recognition as Hokti tells her that they "come from generations of medicine people, healers," and that "this is the power we carry." She tells Willie Jack that Willie Jack does not need her, she needs "this" – her people. Hokti also advises her that she cannot help people who do not want help, but Willie Jack is determined to help her friends the way Hokti has helped her. Back at home, Willie Jack tries to lead the Rez Dogs through the same prayer, but it does not work. They are still drifting apart. She gives them Daniel's letter and, as they all read it, they resolve to do something that he had wanted to do.
18	10	"I Still Believe"	Sterlin Harjo	Tommy Pico	September 28, 2022	210
Daniel's letter indicates that he wanted to drive to California and see the ocean with Bear, Willie Jack, Elora, and Cheese, and that he was in love with Elora. The Rez Dogs and Jackie sneak into the salvage yard to steal back Elora's grandmother's car. Kenny catches them but is philosophical about it, stating that they are simply borrowing the car and will pay him back when they can – even if that is in the next life. Kenny tries to relate to them with a quote from Dances with Wolves, but just confuses them. With Elora driving, they go to California, deciding to take Daniel's letter to the ocean. They go into a restaurant in Los Angeles and their car is stolen with all of their money and belongings. White Jesus appears and says he will guide them to the ocean. He leads them to a homeless encampment, where they stop for the night until it is raided by police. At dawn they walk five more miles to the sea. At the water they draw on their experiences of the past season and Willie Jack sings a new version of the song they sang at the river, this time to free them from grief and despair. She asks Cheese to lead a prayer and he speaks powerfully about Daniel. In the water, crying and hugging, Daniel joins them as a spirit and they are united in their love for one another. When they return to the shore, Elora says she needs to return the car to Kenny. Bear tells the others that he is not going back.

=== Season 3 (2023) ===
No. overall	No. in season	Title	Directed by	Written by	Original release date	Prod. code
19	1	"BUSSIN'"	Danis Goulet	Sterlin Harjo & Dallas Goldtooth	August 2, 2023	301
The Rez Dogs are stranded with no car and no money in California. They find Bear's father's house, but an irritated white woman with two Native children answers the door and says that he is not home. Bear leaves the beaded medallion he commissioned, for his dad, along with a sad and angry goodbye note. Elora's aunt Teenie arrives to bring the children back to Oklahoma by bus. At a bus station along the way, Bear misses the bus because he is in the restroom being advised by spirit guide William Knifeman. With a dead cellphone and no money or transportation, Bear wanders off into a field, accompanied only by Knifeman, whose monologues Bear finds increasingly long-winded and confusing. Bear is frustrated and worried that he will die there. On the bus, unaware that Bear was left behind, Teenie tells Elora that Elora's dad is still alive, that she is friends with him on social media, and that he is white.
20	2	"Maximus"	Tazbah Chavez	Tazbah Chavez	August 2, 2023	302
Bear is lost without food or water, in the harsh sun on the plains. A Spanish conquistador spirit attacks him. William Knifeman saves him, but an overwhelmed Bear yells at his spirit guide to leave him alone. Knifeman sheds one tear and leaves. Bear is shot with a tranquilizer dart by Maximus – an eccentric mohawked recluse driving a dune buggy. Maximus studies star maps, monitors radio frequencies, and grows eggplants "for when the star people return." He is violently opposed to outsiders but takes a liking to Bear and shows him around his compound. Maximus tells Bear that he also sees spirits, which makes people either jealous or fearful. He tells Bear that because no one, not even his friends, believed what he saw was real, he was locked up and given shock treatments. When Bear says his friends believe him, Maximus is angry, because he feels that Bear has nothing to complain about. Maximus shows Bear home movies of himself and his friends in the 1970s, when he lived on the same reservation Bear is from. The group seems similar to Bear's Rez Dogs, and one of them is Elora's Uncle Brownie. Maximus points to his younger self and says he reminds him of Bear. Eventually police and healthcare workers come and take Maximus away peacefully. After watering the eggplants, Bear heads back to Oklahoma on foot.
21	3	"Deer Lady"	Danis Goulet	Sterlin Harjo	August 9, 2023	303
Deer Lady stops at a diner. Bear arrives at the diner, still penniless and lost, but polite to everyone even though they do not help him. Deer Lady observes him for a while and then invites him to sit with her. She shares her food with him and offers him a ride back to Oklahoma. When he realizes who she is, he is frightened, but does not run. Through flashbacks, we learn that when this incarnation of Deer Lady was still human, she was a child at a very abusive American Indian boarding school, St. Nicholas Training School, where she witnessed her friends being beaten and killed. One night she escaped and fled for her life. She was saved in the woods by an otherworldly deer, became the Deer Lady, and exacts vengeance on abusers. Bear goes with her and waits in the truck while she goes to the home of the abusive man who ran the boarding school. Bear is worried but ultimately approves of her seeking justice for herself and the other children of the school. Together they drive back to Okern, and Bear returns home.
22	4	"Friday" "Fridays at IHS"	Tazbah Chavez	Erica Tremblay	August 16, 2023	304
At the IHS Clinic, the Rez Dogs are punished for running away to California. Willie Jack and Cheese have to clean up graffiti Willie Jack painted on the IHS building. She talks to Old Man Fixico while Cheese cleans. Fixico says he has no one to pass his medicine ways on to when he dies. Willie Jack says she's interested in learning. Cheese finally picks up his glasses and is amazed at how much clearer the world looks. Elora cleans with Willie Jack's dad, who offers her a job, but Elora is thinking of going back to school. She gets her records and learns the name of her birth father. Even though Jackie did not go to California, Auntie Bev makes her join the cleaning crew with Bear. As Bev and Rita watch them interact, Bev becomes convinced Bear and Jackie are going to get together and have a baby. Bev then flirts ostentatiously with Big. No one believes Bear when he says he met Deer Lady.
23	5	"House Made of Bongs"	Blackhorse Lowe	Tommy Pico and Sterlin Harjo	August 23, 2023	305
In 1976 in Okern, Maximus, Brownie, Bucky, Irene, and Mabel are students at the same boarding school attended by Deer Lady, but now there are some Indian teachers, it is more like a regular boarding school, and there are sports teams called "Chieftains" (with an Indian mascot). It is the end of the school year. Maximus (who prefers to be called Cvpon) is filming his friends, making the home movies shown in episode 2. They go to a party by a lake where they smoke marijuana, drink, and take LSD. They talk about what they want for their older selves. Maximus has never taken LSD before and is very altered. Fixico arrives and is very popular. He has recently begun his training as a medicine man and Maximus is jealous. Fixico tries to make peace with Maximus but fails. Driving home, Maximus has his first encounter with the star people, but no one believes him.
24	6	"Frankfurter Sandwich"	Blackhorse Lowe	Bobby Wilson and Sterlin Harjo	August 30, 2023	306
Cheese is isolating and avoiding his friends. Alone in his room, he plays video games for days on end. Grandmother Irene is worried about him and calls the Uncles for help. Brownie, Bucky and Big arrive and take a reluctant Cheese on a camping trip. Cheese has trouble adjusting to being alone with his thoughts, and the older men in the silence as they fish and sit around the fire. But eventually he adapts, admitting that he is afraid his older friends will move on without him. He gets the Uncles to open up about their feelings also. They tell him about their "lost" friend, Maximus, and say they worry that Cheese will get lost like him. The Uncles cry with sorrow and regret about how they let down their friend. Cheese promises he will not let that happen to him. He calls his friends and the Rez Dogs come out to the woods to join Cheese and the Uncles on their retreat.
25	7	"Wahoo!"	Kawennáhere Devery Jacobs	Migizi Pensoneau	September 6, 2023	307
Rita is offered a promotion at IHS and is considering moving away from Okern for a better-paying job. As she weighs her options, her dead friend Cookie appears to her as a spirit. Frightened and troubled, Rita rushes to the clinic and asks to see Larry, the therapist. He does not believe Rita, and insists that it is all in her mind. He wants to talk about trauma, mainly his own. Rita is left with no option but to listen to Cookie. Cookie has been trying to reach Elora, the daughter she never got a chance to raise, desperate to tell her she loves her and has been looking out for her, but only Rita can see Cookie. Rita and Cookie sit with Elora and Rita tries to communicate with Elora for Cookie. It is awkward, but seems to help everyone. Cookie tells Rita that the ability to see spirits runs in some families. This experience changes Rita and back at home she tells Bear that she believes his story about meeting Deer Lady. Since Cookie said that she was neither in the world of the living or the world of the dead, Rita gets Bev and Natalie, and they go to the river to pray and say goodbye to Cookie, to let go so their friend can be free to cross over to the other side.
26	8	"Send It"	Erica Tremblay	Sterlin Harjo and Ryan RedCorn	September 13, 2023	308
The Rez Dogs, NDN Mafia and Kenny Boy are brought in for questioning by Big. At an elder breakfast, Fixico and Irene reminisce about their youth and in particular Maximus. Fixico regrets that he and his cousin have never buried the hatchet before one of them goes to the spirit in the sky. The Rez Dogs decide to make it happen before it is too late after Fixico has a heart attack. They approach Kenny Boy to borrow a car to spring Maximus from hospital; instead he takes them in an old school bus. When Bear and Willie Jack learn that Maximus can come and go from hospital as he pleases, they convince him to act like they are busting him out so as not to lose face with the rest of the gang. Just as they reach Okern, the bus breaks down and is engulfed in a fireball.
27	9	"Elora's Dad"	Sterlin Harjo	Kawennáhere Devery Jacobs	September 20, 2023	309
Elora attends college for an interview. With no scholarships available she needs her absentee father's financial information to apply for financial aid. After tracking him down she makes it clear she is not looking for a relationship, just the information. He reveals Elora has three half-siblings and presents her with a photograph of her on her first birthday; the last time he saw her. Elora agrees to meet them and whilst chatting, bonds with her father.
28	10	"Dig"	Sterlin Harjo	Chad Charlie & Sterlin Harjo	September 27, 2023	310
The community unites for Old Man Fixico's funeral. The Rez Dogs, along with many of the other recurring characters from the series, gather to participate in the ceremony and burial. The women prepare a large meal overseen by the elders. During the event, Elora informs Bear that she is leaving town for college. Bear, acknowledging the depth of their friendship, supports her decision. Bear meets with Spirit for the last time, coming to the realization that he does not have to be the only leader and recognizing the strength of his community. Willie Jack, inspired by advice from Hokti in prison, delivers a speech at sunrise, honoring Fixico's legacy. The episode culminates in a group hug among Bear, Elora, Willie Jack, and Cheese. The series concludes with the elders reflecting on the successful send-off for Fixico. They raise their cups of coffee, a gesture signifying continuity and remembrance.

== Production ==
=== Development ===
The series was first reported on in November 2019 and was confirmed by Taika Waititi on Twitter shortly after. The initial report announced that Waititi would be co-writing the series with Native American filmmaker Sterlin Harjo, who would also share executive producer and directing duties with Waititi. After the pilot had been shot in Okmulgee, Oklahoma, FX announced a series order for the project in December 2020. The casting for the four lead actors, D'Pharaoh Woon-A-Tai, Devery Jacobs, Paulina Alexis, and newcomer Lane Factor, was also confirmed at this time, alongside a group of guest stars to be featured in the pilot episode.

Filming sites for principal photography for season one, which had wrapped by July 2021, included Okmulgee, Tulsa, Sand Springs, Beggs, Inola, and Terlton, all in northeast Oklahoma. On September 2, 2021, FX renewed the series for a second season, also filmed on location in Okmulgee.

Harjo later created another FX series, The Lowdown, which he confirmed to take place in the same fictional universe as Reservation Dogs. Hawke and Horn appear in the series as different characters; however, Alexis makes a cameo appearance in the pilot episode as Willie Jack while Jacobs has a cameo as Postoak in the second episode.

=== Creative team ===
The series features a predominantly Indigenous cast and crew, including creator Sterlin Harjo and an all-Native writers' room. It's the first show to feature an entirely Native writers' room. Discussing their creative partnership and respective roles in the production, Waititi stressed, "I really believe people need to tell their own stories and especially from whatever area they are from", leading to Harjo, who is from Oklahoma, taking the lead on the project and Waititi taking a more supporting role. Additionally, many of the storylines in the show are inspired by events from Harjo's childhood.

Part of the development process included casting unknown actors from Indigenous communities, and the young leads in particular forming a working rapport, often around their shared love of Indigenous comedy. Jacobs and Alexis added that they bonded over their mutual appreciation of the sketch comedy group 1491s. Four of the five members of the 1491s worked on season one of the series, and with the addition of Ryan RedCorn to the writers' room for season two, all of the 1491s worked on Reservation Dogs as writers and actors, directors, or producers. On September 22, 2022, FX renewed the series for a third season. Harjo announced on June 29, 2023, that the show would end with the third season.

=== Themes ===
The series explores themes of death, grief, and community, mirroring experiences common in Native American communities. The series is marked by loss, notably the off-screen deaths of Daniel and Elora Danan's mother, Cookie. This theme of loss resonates throughout its three seasons, culminating in the series finale.

== Release ==
The series premiered on FX on Hulu in the United States on August 9, 2021. In international markets, it is distributed through the Star hub of the Disney+ streaming service. In Latin America, the series premiered as a Star+ original. In India, all eight episodes of season 1 premiered on Disney+ Hotstar on October 2, 2021.

The series made its cable TV premiere on FX in the United States on June 26, 2023.

== Reception ==
=== Critical response ===
Critical response of Reservation Dogs
Season	Rotten Tomatoes	Metacritic
1	98% (61 reviews)	84 (22 reviews)
2	100% (35 reviews)	93 (16 reviews)
3	100% (40 reviews)	94 (15 reviews)

All three seasons of Reservation Dogs received critical acclaim. On the review aggregator website Rotten Tomatoes, the overall series holds a 99% approval rating. Meanwhile, on Metacritic, which uses a weighted average, the overall series received a score of 89 out of 100. Each season of the series was also listed among the ten best television programs of 2021, 2022, and 2023, respectively, by the American Film Institute.

==== Season 1 ====
On Rotten Tomatoes, the first season received an approval rating of 98% with an average score of 8.2 out of 10, based on 61 reviews. The site's critical consensus reads: "Aimless afternoons yield absurd delights in Reservation Dogs, a low-key comedy that deftly captures the malaise of youth and Rez life thanks in no small part to its impressive central crew." On Metacritic, it received a score of 84 out of 100, based on 22 reviews, indicating "universal acclaim".

Writing for The Guardian, Ellen E Jones gave the show a rating of five out of five, and said "Reservation Dogs is able to lay waste stylishly to centuries of myth and misrepresentation due to one simple, crucial, innovation: almost everyone involved in the production is a Native American, offering a perspective which never panders to the often-fetishising gaze of outsiders. Instead, this show tells of the push-pull of home: that simultaneous yearning to both belong and be free". Candice Frederick of TV Guide rated the series four out of five, based on the first four episodes and said, "Though it wrestles with some heavy, but not overtly political, themes, Reservation Dogs seems to mostly have fun with young life on a reservation." In another four out five rating, Alan Sepinwall, writing for Rolling Stone, said, "a show like Reservation Dogs feels long overdue. And this exact show? It's awfully good." Paste magazine's Allison Keene gave a rating of 9.2 out of 10 and called the series "a perfect summer series, one that takes places on languid afternoons and moves at an unhurried pace."

Reviewing the first two episodes, Danette Chavez of The A.V. Club gave it a "B+" and said, "Reservation Dogs is already on track to be one of the best comedies (and shows) of the year." Kristen Lopez of IndieWire also gave it a grade of "B+", saying, "[Reservation Dogs] is a surprising series that illustrates why everyone's story is worth telling" and also praised the four main actors, stating that "the teens assembled here are all fantastic, conveying so much about their characters' true selves even if they don't know it yet". Vox's Emily St. James also praised the main actors, calling them "one of the best ensembles of teen characters in recent memory" and regarded the first season as "one of the best first seasons of a comedy in some time." Daniel Fienberg of The Hollywood Reporter also praised the cast as well as the "triumph" representation of the Native Americans.

The New Yorker's Doreen St. Félix wrote, "Reservation Dogs is a mood piece, and a sweet one, a collection of intertwined and poetic portraiture that focuses not solely on the central cast". Daniel D'Addario of Variety said, "Reservation Dogs is a lovely, eminently watchable triumph. It's an overdue tribute to a sort of community it doesn't mythologize. Instead, the show treats the reservation and its residents on their own terms, as worthy of being explored for just what it is, and just who they are." Polygon's Joshua Rivera praised the series, saying, "like a lot of great art, Reservation Dogs challenges its audience with wit and style to look in spaces that have long been ignored, and identify with experiences that are outside their own." Writing for IGN, Matt Fowler said, "Reservation Dogs features characters we like, a community we're drawn to (and may be curious about)." Esther Zuckerman of Thrillist praised the series' tone, stating that "Reservation Dogs is at times melancholy, and at times deeply irreverent. But whatever mood it's going for at any given moment, it's some of the most unique, enjoyable, and artistically satisfying television available to watch."

==== Season 2 ====
On Rotten Tomatoes, the second season holds an approval rating of 100%, with an average score of 9.1 out of 10, based on 35 reviews. The site's critical consensus reads: "Reservation Dogs has bittersweet bite in its sophomore season as it mines more difficult dilemmas than before with its spiky sense of humor, making for a piquant portrait of a community and a place." On Metacritic, it holds a score of 93 out of 100, based on 16 reviews, indicating "universal acclaim".

Critics were given the first four episodes prior to its premiere to review. It received an "A" from Manuel Betancourt of The A.V. Club and Chase Hutchinson of Collider, an "A-" from Darren Franich of Entertainment Weekly and Brian Tallerico of The Playlist, and a "B+" from Kristen Lopez of IndieWire. Betancourt highlighted the way it treats dark materials, such as generational trauma, wounding grief, and systemic inequities, with "winsome humor", without going too far. Hutchinson praised the writing, humor, and performances, particularly Jacobs' and Woon-A-Tai's. Daniel Fienberg of The Hollywood Reporter also praised the performances and further singled out Jacobs', particularly in the episode "Mabel". Kristen Reid of Paste gave it a 9.3 out of 10 and said, "Just a season and a half in, Harjo and co-creator Taika Waititi have already found their groove with Reservation Dogs. Inviting us onto the reservation to experience it with this group of quickly beloved kids, [It] feels like a celebration of Native life and a way to inspire change for the better."

Variety's Caroline Framke wrote in her favorable review: "for the hundreds of shows premiering every year, there's still simply nothing else on TV quite like 'Reservation Dogs'. [It] gives voice, time, and flawed dirtbag humanity to Indigenous Americans, who have long been little more onscreen than one-note punchlines. But it also does so with an approach that could only have come from these writers, actors, directors and production crew members. This is a show so self-assured in its own voice and perspective that it's not just gratifying to watch, but a welcome relief." Joe Keller of Decider summarized his review by saying, "Reservation Dogs improves on its excellent first season by deepening the community on the rez, making it less about the Dogs and more about traditions, people who think they know the traditions but don't, and just how funny and rich life there can be, even if people have to be creative to get by."

For the season finale, TVLine named Woon-A-Tai, Jacobs, Factor and Alexis the "Performers of the Week" for the week of October 1, 2022. The site wrote: "No single actor outshined the others; rather, it was their combined chemistry and the characters' reliance on each other that made us laugh at their antics and reel in their heartbreak. [...] Jacobs exhibited a wealth of vulnerability in her body language and diction as Elora admitted her fear of letting Daniel go. Woon-A-Tai was brought to tears, as Bear was consumed by love for his friends. Alexis displayed a wealth of fortitude as Willie Jack proved to be both the Dogs' safety net and comedic relief. And after they joined together for a prayer, Factor quivered and choked on his emotions as Cheese revealed his lingering anger."

==== Season 3 ====
On Rotten Tomatoes, the third and final season holds an approval rating of 100%, with an average score of 9.5 out of 10, based on 40 reviews. The site's critical consensus reads: "Bowing out while still having plenty of creativity to spare, Reservation Dogs' final season sidesteps feeling premature by satisfying on every level." On Metacritic, it holds a score of 94 out of 100, based on 15 reviews, indicating "universal acclaim." The series finale received an "A" from Manuel Betancourt of The A.V. Club, who wrote that showrunner Hajro and the cast and crew "made good on the promising storytelling that was already evident in its near-perfect pilot episode a few years back."

=== Critics' top ten list ===
2021
- No. 1 Adweek
- No. 1 Deadline
- No. 1 Entertainment Weekly
- No. 1 Exclaim!
- No. 1 The Hollywood Reporter (Angie Han)
- No. 1 Now
- No. 1 Sioux City Journal
- No. 2 The A.V. Club (Danette Chavez and Jarrod Jones)
- No. 2 Good Morning America
- No. 2 Houston Press
- No. 2 Rolling Stone
- No. 2 Vulture (Kathryn VanArendonk)
- No. 3 The A.V. Club (Baraka Kaseko, Noel Murray, and Caroline Siede)
- No. 3 Film School Rejects
- No. 3 The Hollywood Reporter (Daniel Fienberg)
- No. 4 Adweek
- No. 4 TVLine
- No. 4 Uproxx
- No. 4 Variety
- No. 5 The A.V. Club (Myles McNutt)
- No. 5 BuzzFeed
- No. 5 Nylon
- No. 5 The Oregonian
- No. 5 Time
- No. 6 ScreenCrush
- No. 6 Slant
- No. 7 Mashable
- No. 7 Pittsburgh Tribune-Review
- No. 7 The Ringer
- No. 8 IndieWire
- No. 8 The Observer
- No. 8 Paste
- No. 8 Vulture (Matt Zoller Seitz)
- No. 8 The Washington Post
- No. 10 Vulture (Jen Chaney and Roxana Hadadi)
- No. 10 WhatCulture
- – The Atlantic
- – CNN
- – Lifehacker
- – Los Angeles Times
- – Nerdist
- – The New York Times
- – The New Yorker
- – Polygon
- – Toronto Star
- – Vox
- – Wired

2022
- No. 1 The Hollywood Reporter (Daniel Fienberg)
- No. 1 Rolling Stone
- No. 1 Variety
- No. 1 Vulture (Kathryn VanArendonk)
- No. 1 Entertainment Weekly (Kristen Baldwin)
- No. 2 Houston Chronicle
- No. 2 The Playlist
- No. 2 The Watch (Andy Greenwald)
- No. 3 TV Guide
- No. 3 Vulture (Roxana Hadadi)
- No. 2 The Hollywood Reporter (Angie Han)
- No. 4 Time
- No. 4 TV Insider
- No. 5 The A.V. Club
- No. 5 The Ringer
- No. 5 ScreenCrush
- No. 5 TVLine
- No. 5 Vulture (Jen Chaney)
- No. 9 The Watch (Chris Ryan)
- No. 10 Paste
- No. 10 Polygon
- – The Austin Chronicle
- – BuzzFeed
- – Lifehacker
- – The New York Times

=== Accolades ===
Year	Award	Category	Nominee(s)	Result	Ref.
2021	American Film Institute Awards	Top 10 Programs of the Year	Reservation Dogs	Won	
2021	Gotham Awards	Breakthrough Series – Short Form	Reservation Dogs	Won	
2021	Gotham Awards	Outstanding Performance in a New Series	Devery Jacobs	Nominated	
2022	American Film Institute Awards	Top 10 Programs of the Year	Reservation Dogs	Won	
2022	Artios Awards	Outstanding Achievement in Casting – Television Pilot and First Season Comedy Series	Angelique Midthunder, Jennifer Schwalenberg, Chris Freihofer, Stacey Rice, and Lisa Zambetti	Nominated	
2022	Critics' Choice Television Awards	Best Comedy Series	Reservation Dogs	Nominated	
2022	Golden Globe Awards	Best Television Series – Musical or Comedy	Reservation Dogs	Nominated	
2022	Hollywood Critics Association TV Awards	Best Streaming Series, Comedy	Reservation Dogs	Nominated	
2022	Hollywood Critics Association TV Awards	Best Directing in a Streaming Series, Comedy	Sterlin Harjo (for "Hunting")	Nominated	
2022	Hollywood Critics Association TV Awards	Best Writing in a Streaming Series, Comedy	Sterlin Harjo and Taika Waititi (for "Fuckin' Rez Dogs")	Nominated	
2022	Hollywood Music in Media Awards	Best Music Supervision — Television	Tiffany Anders	Nominated	
2022	Independent Spirit Awards	Best New Scripted Series	Reservation Dogs	Won	
2022	Independent Spirit Awards	Best Ensemble Cast in a New Scripted Series	Paulina Alexis, Funny Bone, Lane Factor, Devery Jacobs, Zahn McClarnon, Lil Mike, Sarah Podemski, and D'Pharaoh Woon-A-Tai	Won	
2022	Peabody Awards	Entertainment	Reservation Dogs	Won	
2022	Television Critics Association Awards	Outstanding Achievement in Comedy	Reservation Dogs	Nominated	
2022	Television Critics Association Awards	Outstanding New Program	Reservation Dogs	Nominated	
2022	Writers Guild of America Awards	New Series	Tazbah Rose Chavez, Sydney Freeland, Sterlin Harjo, Migizi Pensoneau, Tommy Pico, Taika Waititi, and Bobby Wilson	Nominated	
2022	Writers Guild of America Awards	Episodic Comedy	Sterlin Harjo and Taika Waititi (for "F*ckin' Rez Dogs")	Nominated	
2023	American Film Institute Awards	Top 10 Programs of the Year	Reservation Dogs	Won	
2023	Critics' Choice Television Awards	Best Comedy Series	Reservation Dogs	Nominated	
2023	Critics' Choice Television Awards	Best Actor in a Comedy Series	D'Pharaoh Woon-A-Tai	Nominated	
2023	Critics' Choice Television Awards	Best Actress in a Comedy Series	Devery Jacobs	Nominated	
2023	Critics' Choice Television Awards	Best Supporting Actress in a Comedy Series	Paulina Alexis	Nominated	
2023	Golden Trailer Awards	Best Billboard (for Feature Film or TV/Streaming Series)	"Extension Billboard" (AV Print)	Nominated	
2023	Golden Trailer Awards	Best Comedy Poster for a TV/Streaming Series	"One Sheet" (AV Print)	Nominated	
2023	Peabody Awards	Entertainment	Reservation Dogs	Nominated	
2023	Primetime Creative Arts Emmy Awards	Outstanding Sound Editing for a Comedy or Drama Series (Half-Hour) and Animation	Patrick Hogan, David Beadle, Sonya Lindsay, Michael Sana, Daniel Salas, Amber Funk, and Lena Krigen (for "This is Where the Plot Thickens")	Nominated	
2023	Television Critics Association Awards	Outstanding Achievement in Comedy	Reservation Dogs	Nominated	
2023	Writers Guild of America Awards	Episodic Comedy	Tazbah Rose Chavez (for "Wide Net")	Nominated	
2024	Art Directors Guild Awards	Excellence in Production Design for a Half Hour Single-Camera Television Series	Brandon Tonner-Connolly (for "Deer Lady")	Won	
2024	Artios Awards	Outstanding Achievement in Casting – Television Comedy Series	Angelique Midthunder, Chris Freihofer, Stacey Rice, and Tara Mazzucca	Won	
2024	Astra TV Awards	Best Streaming Comedy Series	Reservation Dogs	Nominated	
2024	Astra TV Awards	Best Actress in a Streaming Comedy Series	Devery Jacobs	Nominated	
2024	Astra TV Awards	Best Directing in a Streaming Comedy Series	Sterlin Harjo (for "Dig")	Nominated	
2024	Astra TV Awards	Best Writing in a Streaming Comedy Series	Chad Charlie and Sterlin Harjo (for "Dig")	Nominated	
2024	Critics' Choice Awards	Best Comedy Series	Reservation Dogs	Nominated	
2024	Critics' Choice Awards	Best Actor in a Comedy Series	D'Pharaoh Woon-A-Tai	Nominated	
2024	Critics' Choice Awards	Best Actress in a Comedy Series	Devery Jacobs	Nominated	
2024	Critics' Choice Awards	Best Supporting Actress in a Comedy Series	Paulina Alexis	Nominated	
2024	Dorian Awards	Best TV Comedy	Reservation Dogs	Nominated	
2024	Dorian Awards	Best Unsung TV Show	Reservation Dogs	Won	
2024	Dorian Awards	Best TV Performance - Comedy	Devery Jacobs	Nominated	
2024	Peabody Awards	Entertainment	Reservation Dogs	Won	
2024	Primetime Emmy Awards	Outstanding Comedy Series	Reservation Dogs	Nominated	
2024	Primetime Emmy Awards	Outstanding Lead Actor in a Comedy Series	D'Pharaoh Woon-A-Tai	Nominated	
2024	Primetime Creative Arts Emmy Awards	Outstanding Cinematography for a Single-Camera Series (Half-Hour)	Mark Schwartzbard (for "Deer Lady")	Nominated	
2024	Primetime Creative Arts Emmy Awards	Outstanding Picture Editing for a Single-Camera Comedy Series	Patrick Tuck and Varun Viswanath (for "Dig")	Nominated	
2024	Satellite Awards	Best Comedy or Musical Series	Reservation Dogs	Nominated	
2024	Television Critics Association Awards	Program of the Year	Reservation Dogs	Nominated	
2024	Television Critics Association Awards	Outstanding Achievement in Comedy	Reservation Dogs	Nominated	
2024	Television Critics Association Awards	Individual Achievement in Comedy	Devery Jacobs	Nominated	
2024	Writers Guild of America Awards	Episodic Comedy	Tommy Pico and Sterlin Harjo (for "House Made of Bongs")	Nominated	
2025	Artios Awards	Outstanding Achievement in Casting – Television Comedy Series	Angelique Midthunder, Stacey Rice, Tara Mazzucca, Chris Freihofer	Nominated	
