= Critics' Choice Television Award for Best Supporting Actress in a Comedy Series =

Annual award by the Broadcast Television Critics Association

- Country: United States
- Presented by: Critics Choice Association
- First award: 2011
- Currently held by: Janelle James – Abbott Elementary (2025)
- Website: criticschoice.com

The Critics' Choice Television Award for Best Supporting Actress in a Comedy Series is one of the award categories presented annually by the Critics' Choice Television Awards (BTJA) to recognize the work done by television actresses.

The award was introduced in 2011, when the event was first initiated. The winners are selected by a group of television critics that are part of the Broadcast Television Critics Association.

Eden Sher hold the record with most nominations with five.

== Winners and nominees ==
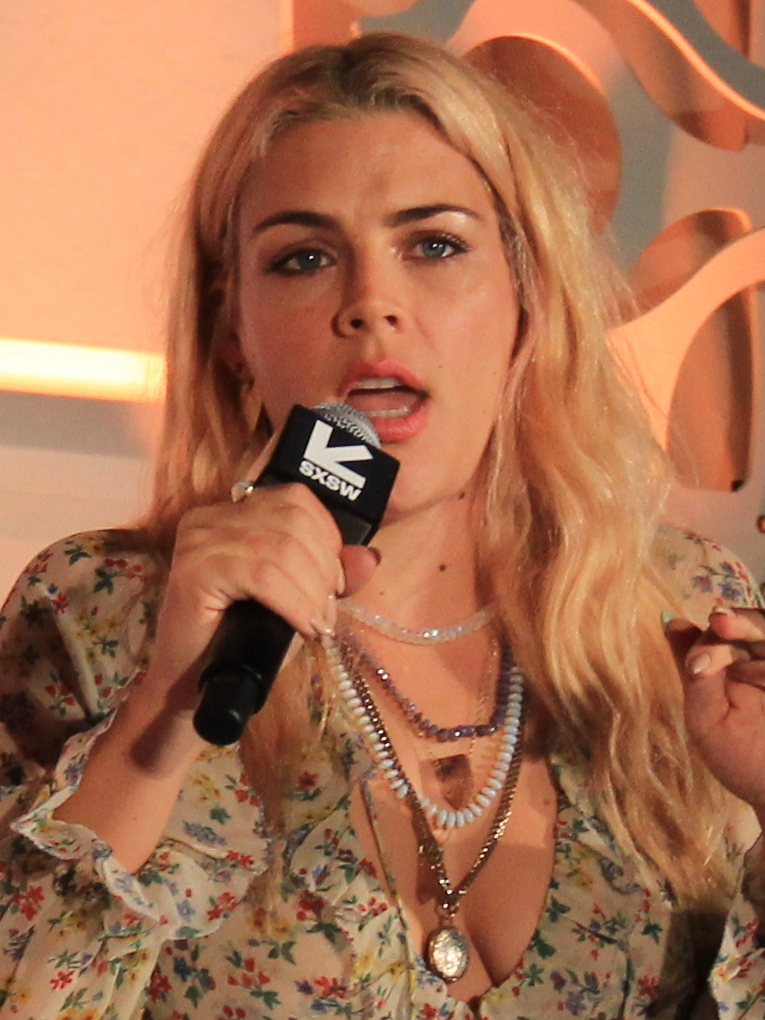
Busy Philipps won for Cougar Town (2011)

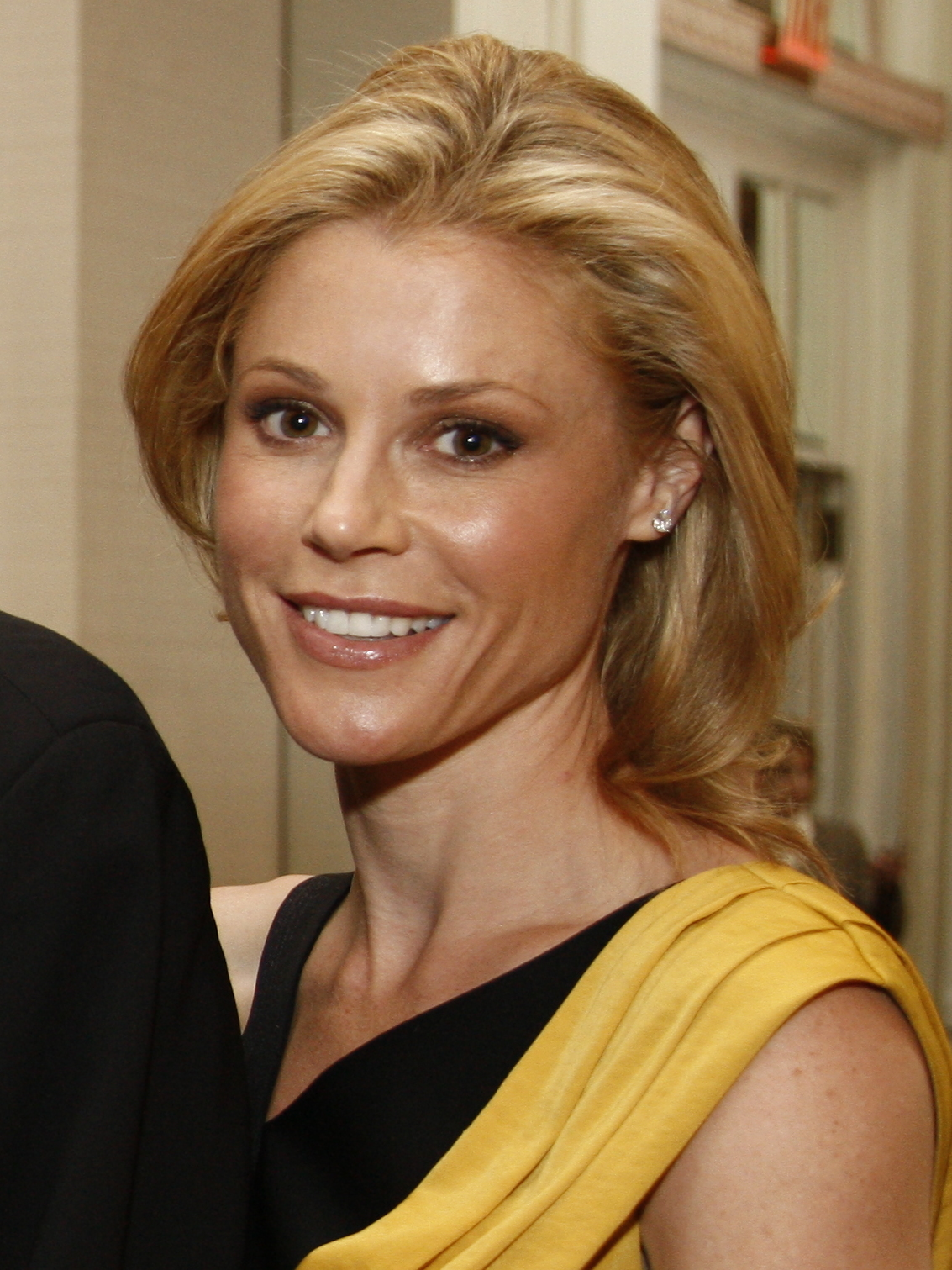
Julie Bowen won for Modern Family (2012)

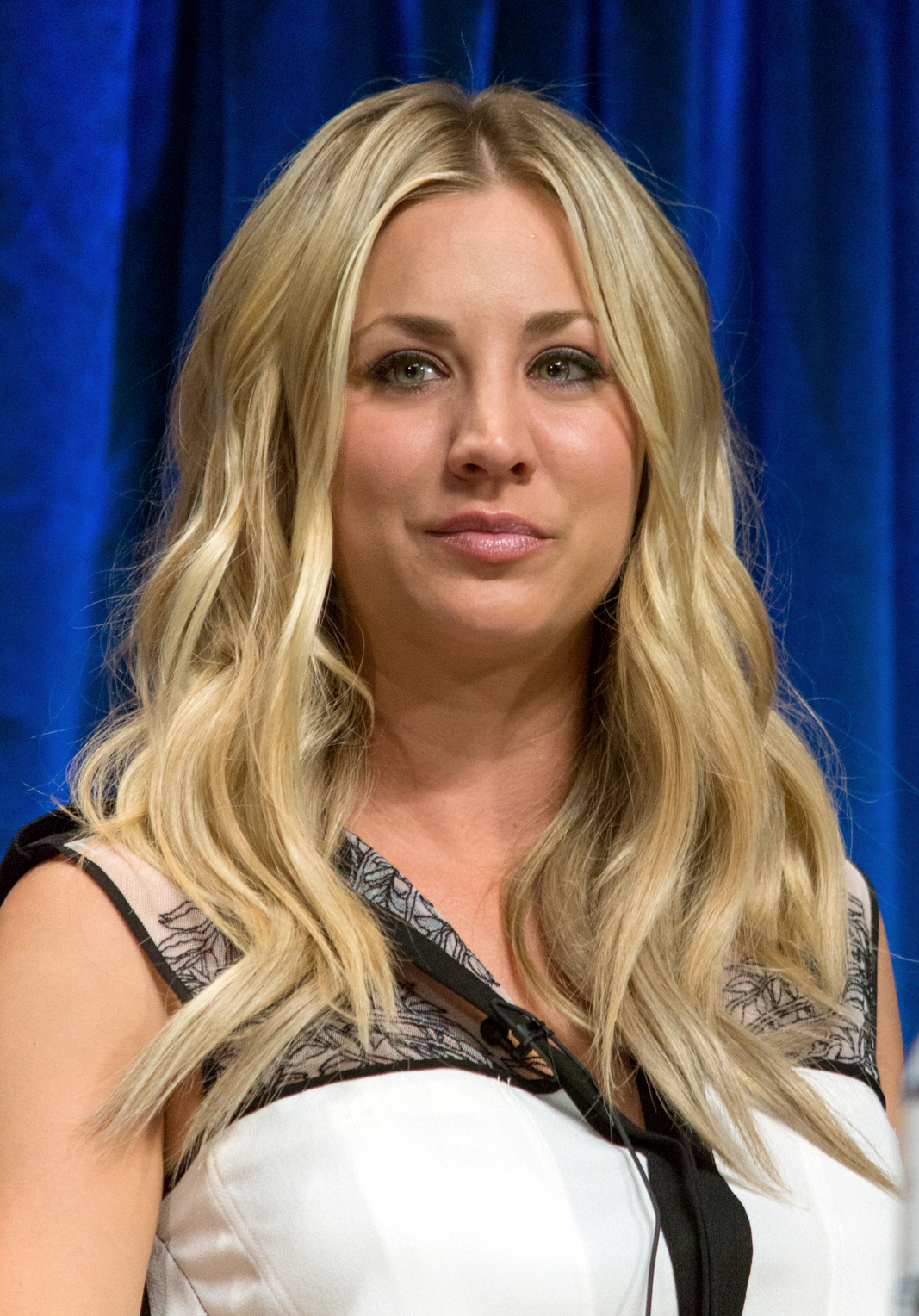
Kaley Cuoco won for The Big Bang Theory (2013)

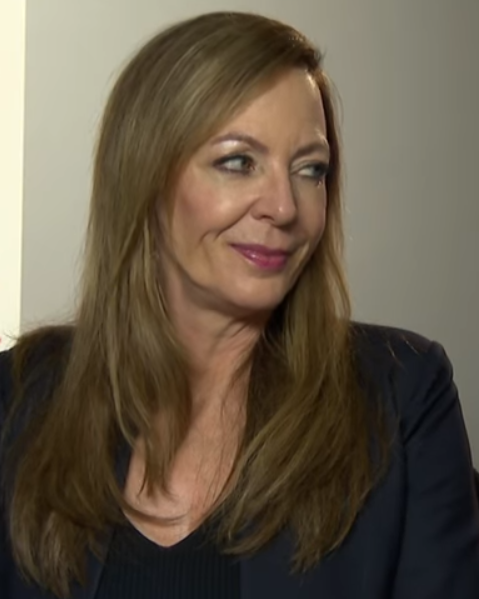
Allison Janney won twice consecutively for Mom (2014–15)

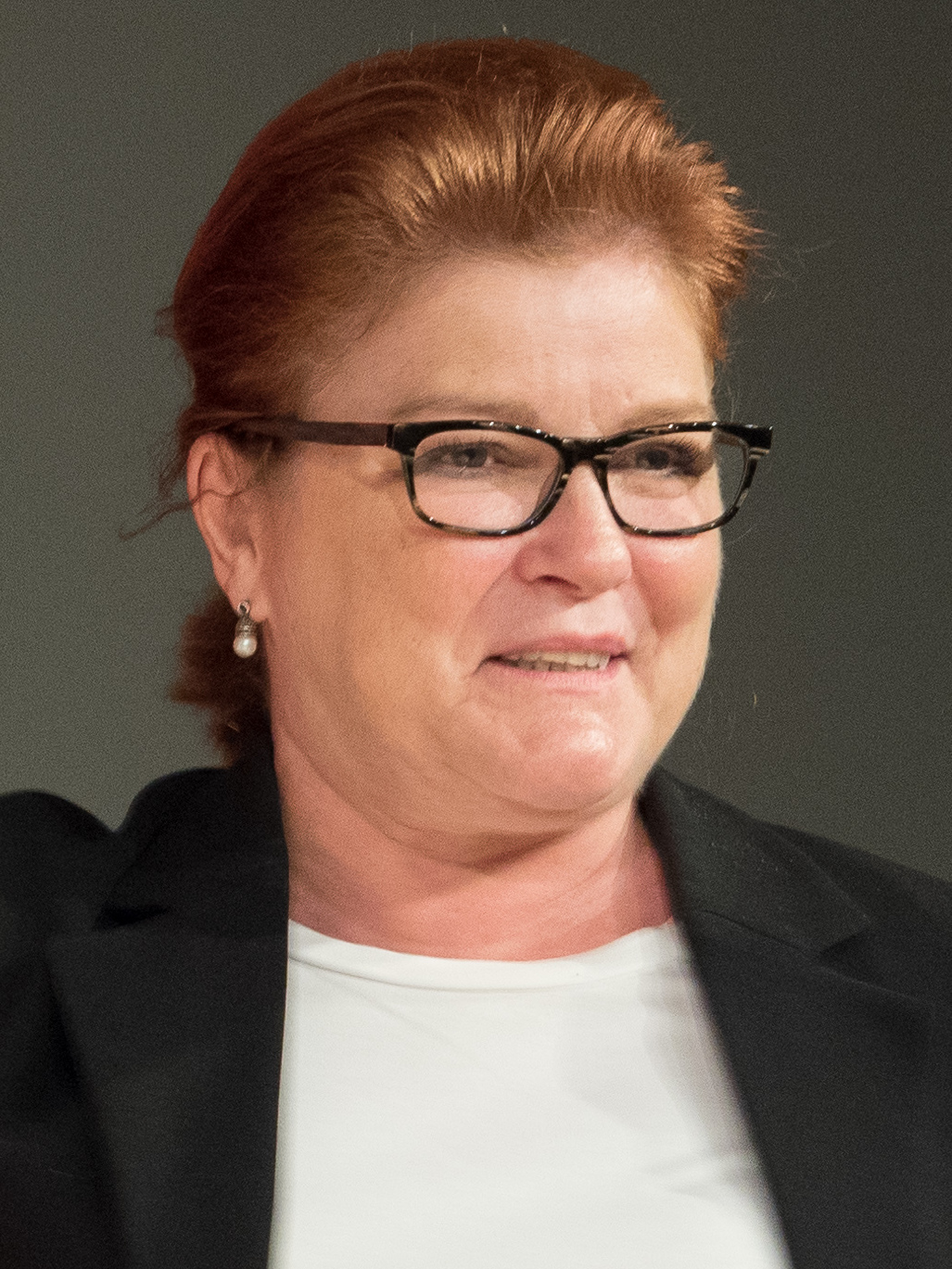
Kate Mulgrew won for Orange is the New Black (2014)

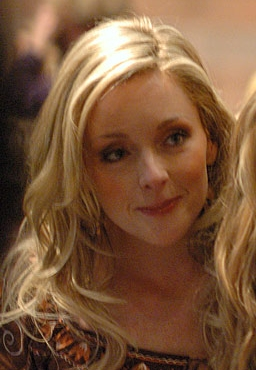
Jane Krakowski won for Unbreakable Kimmy Schmidt (2016)

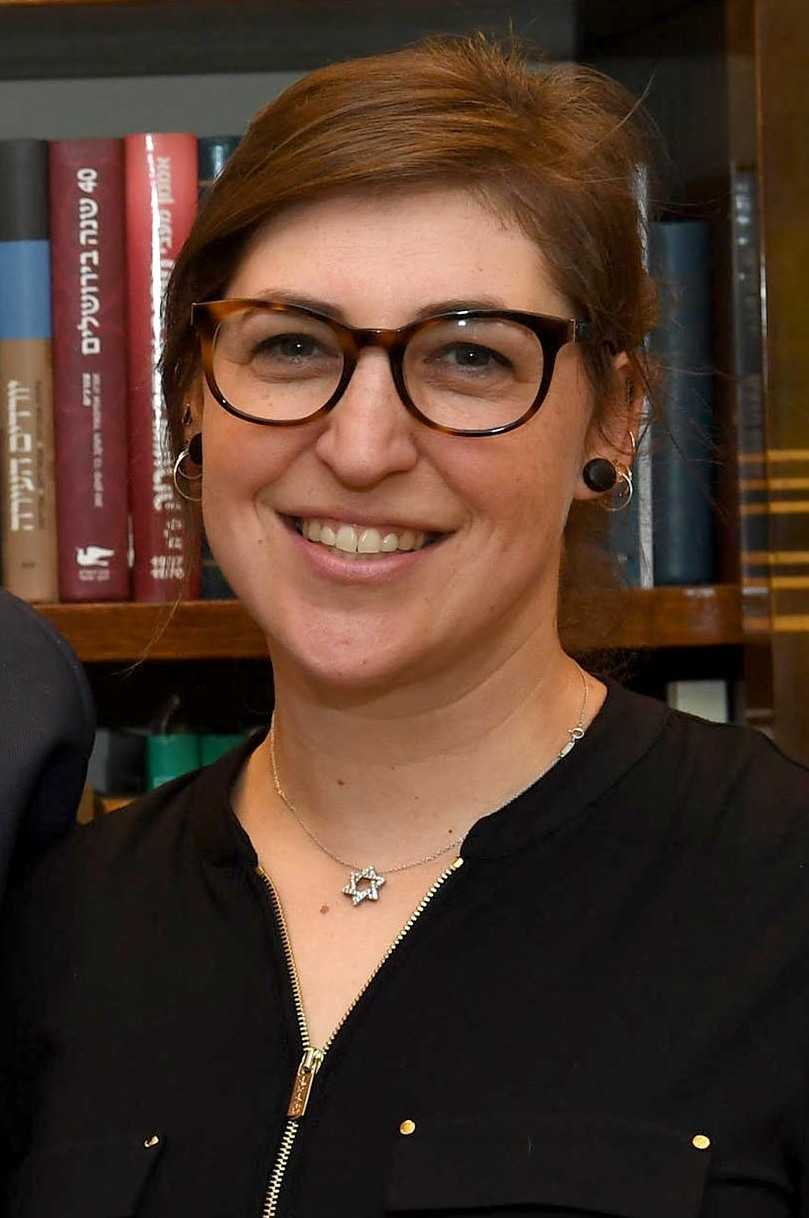
Mayim Bialik won twice for The Big Bang Theory (2016, 2018)

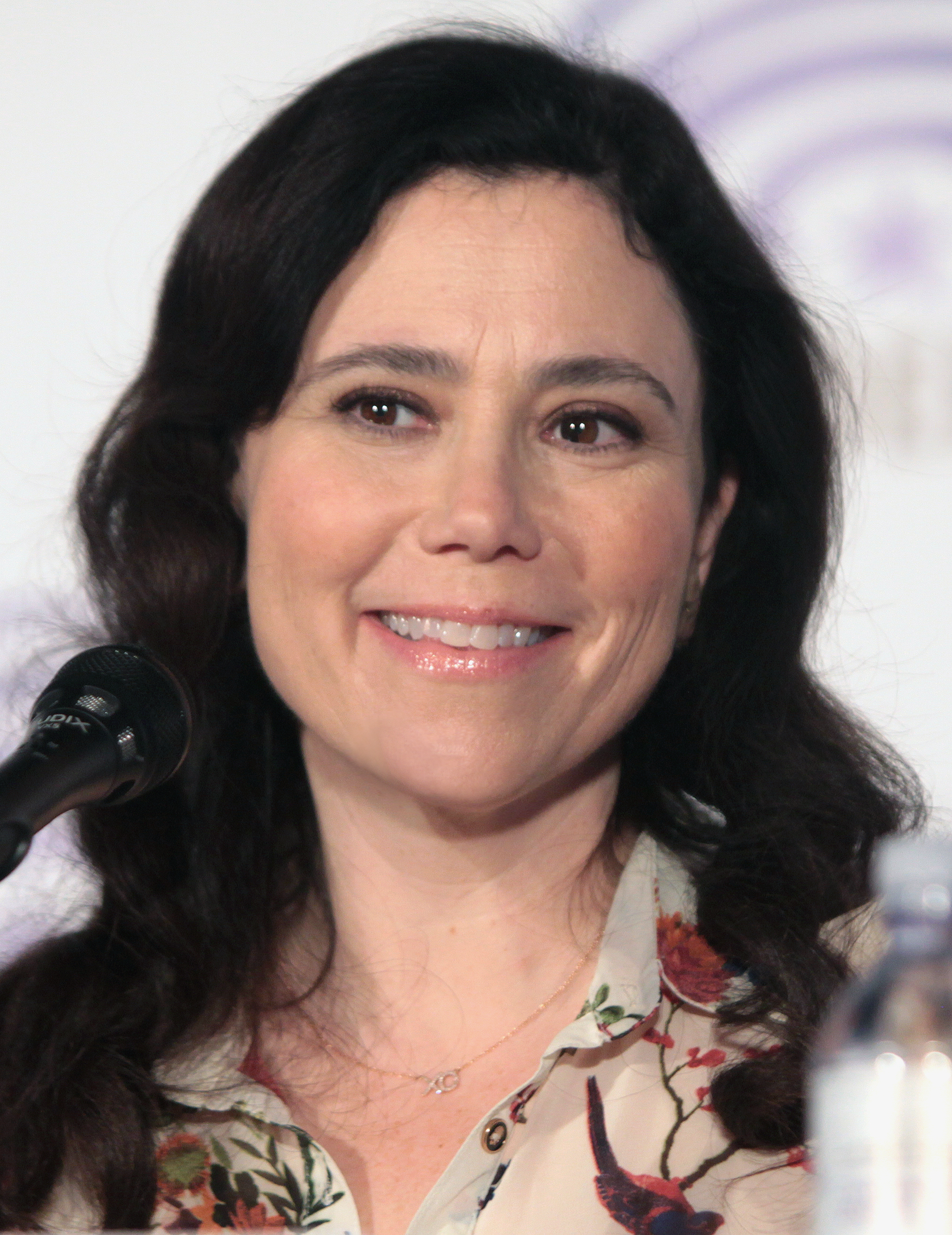
Alex Borstein won twice for The Marvelous Mrs. Maisel (2019–20)

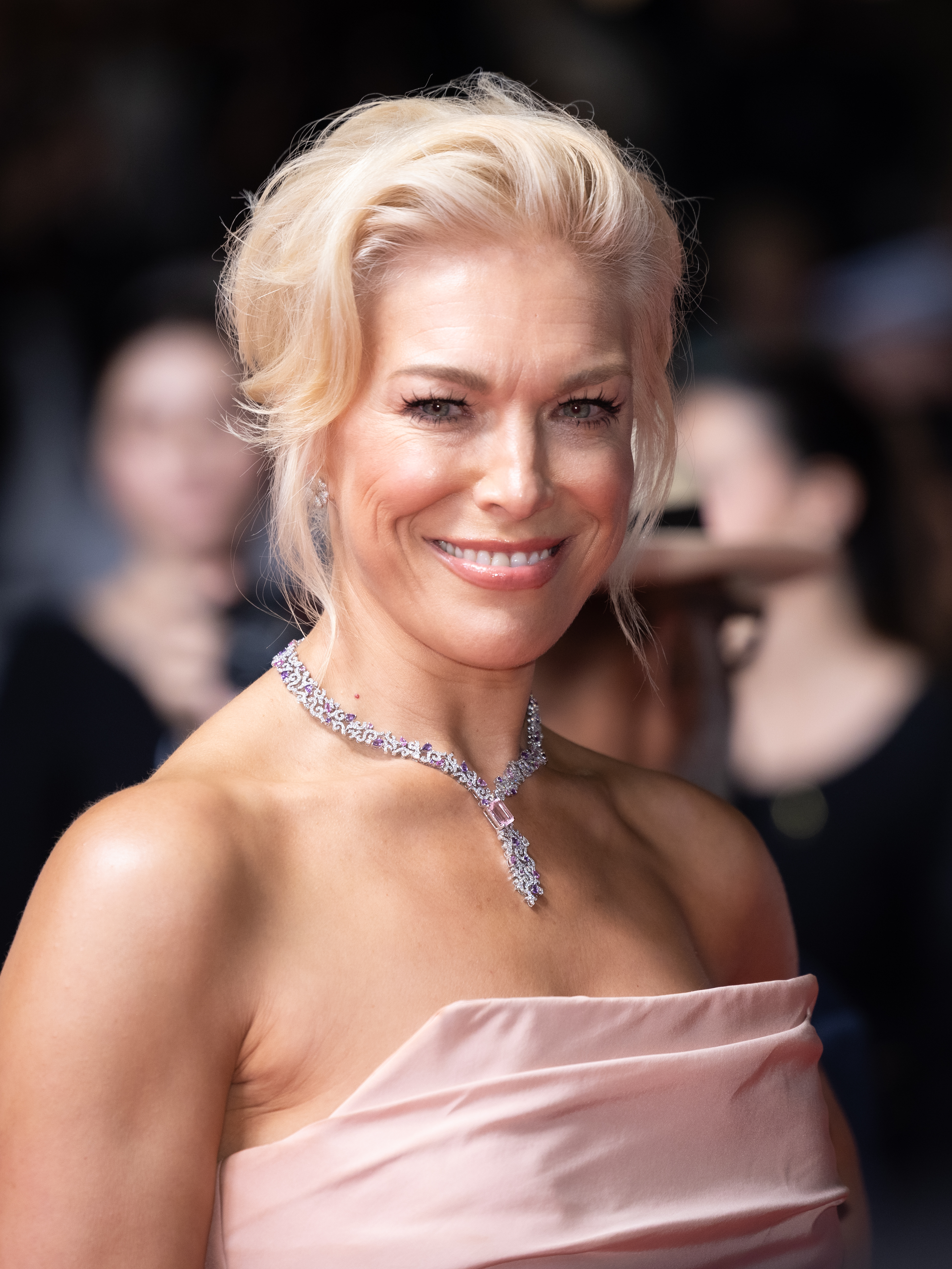
Hannah Waddingham won twice for Ted Lasso (2021–22)

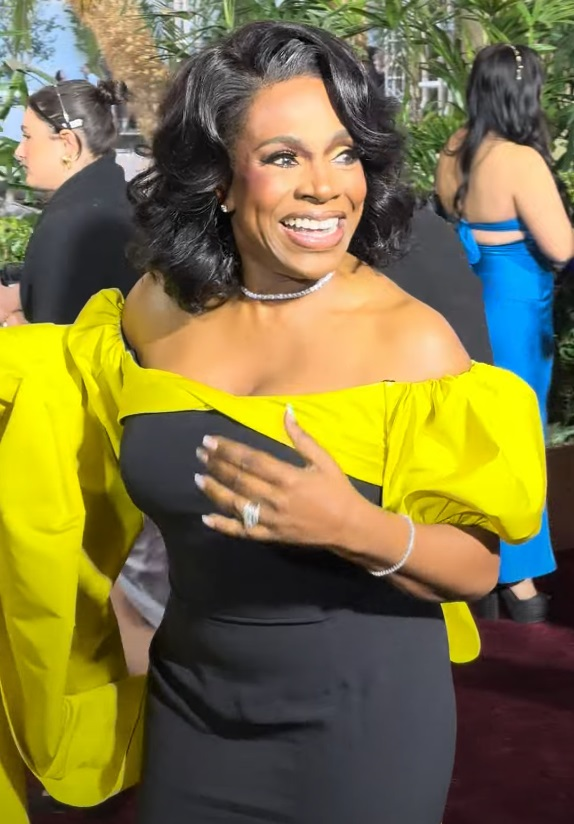
Sheryl Lee Ralph won for Abbott Elementary (2023)

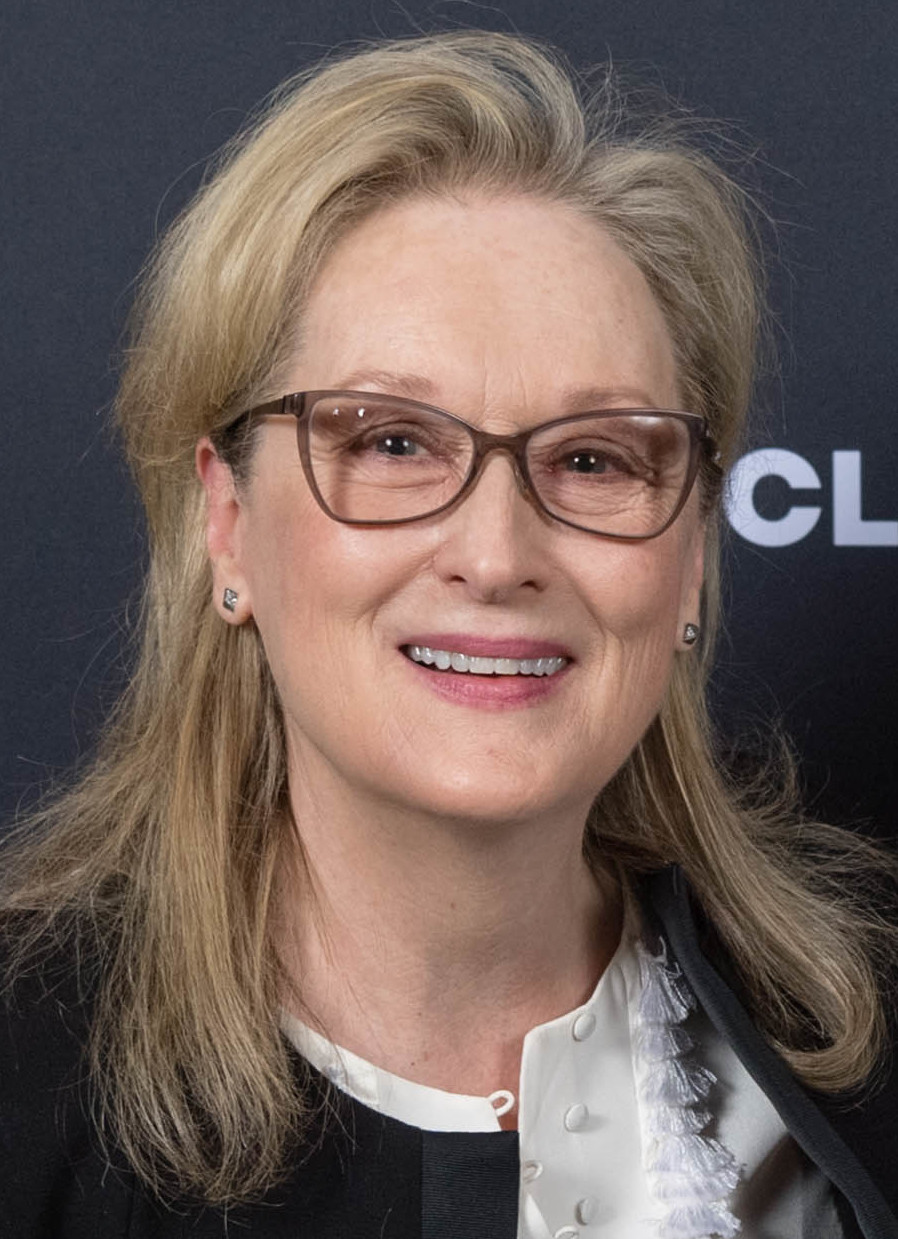
Meryl Streep won for Only Murders in the Building (2024)

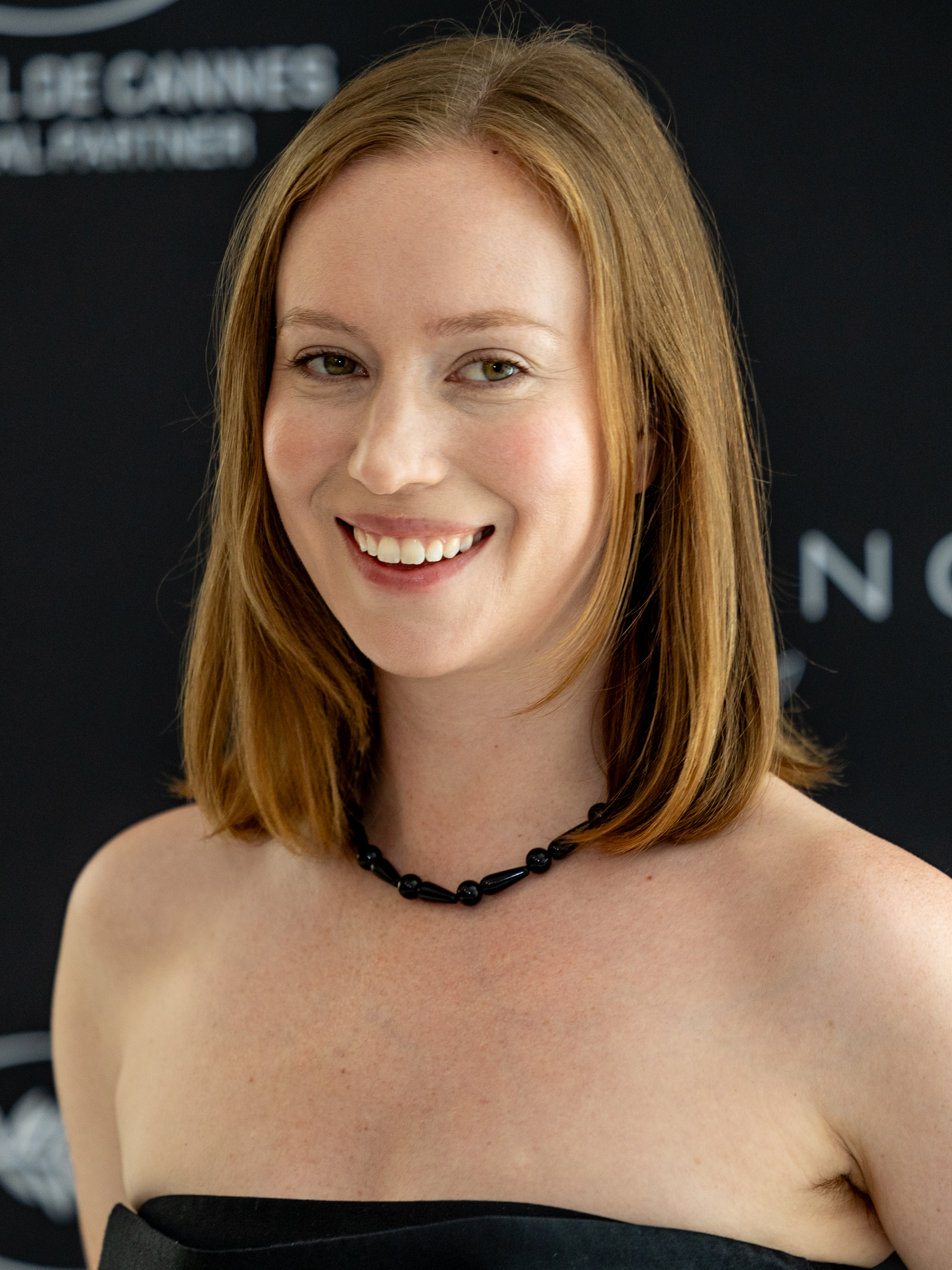
Hannah Einbinder won for Hacks (2025)

indicates the winner

=== 2010s ===
| Year | Actor | Role | Program | Network |
|---|---|---|---|---|
| 2011 | Busy Philipps | Cougar Town | Laurie Keller | ABC |
| 2011 | Julie Bowen | Modern Family | Claire Dunphy | ABC |
| 2011 | Jane Krakowski | 30 Rock | Jenna Maroney | NBC |
| 2011 | Jane Lynch | Glee | Sue Sylvester | Fox |
| 2011 | Eden Sher | The Middle | Sue Heck | ABC |
| 2011 | Sofía Vergara | Modern Family | Gloria Delgado-Pritchett | ABC |
| 2012 | Julie Bowen | Modern Family | Claire Dunphy | ABC |
| 2012 | Alison Brie | Community | Annie Edison | NBC |
| 2012 | Cheryl Hines | Suburgatory | Dallas Royce | ABC |
| 2012 | Gillian Jacobs | Community | Britta Perry | NBC |
| 2012 | Eden Sher | The Middle | Sue Heck | ABC |
| 2012 | Casey Wilson | Happy Endings | Penny Hartz | ABC |
| 2013 | Kaley Cuoco | The Big Bang Theory | Penny | CBS |
| 2013 | Eden Sher | The Middle | Sue Heck | ABC |
| 2013 | Carly Chaikin | Suburgatory | Dalia Royce | ABC |
| 2013 | Sarah Hyland | Modern Family | Haley Dunphy | ABC |
| 2013 | Melissa Rauch | The Big Bang Theory | Dr. Bernadette Rostenkowski-Wolowitz | CBS |
| 2013 | Casey Wilson | Happy Endings | Penny Hartz | ABC |
| 2014 | Allison Janney | Mom | Bonnie Plunkett | CBS |
| 2014 | Kate Mulgrew | Orange Is the New Black | Galina "Red" Reznikov | Netflix |
| 2014 | Mayim Bialik | The Big Bang Theory | Dr. Amy Farrah Fowler | CBS |
| 2014 | Laverne Cox | Orange Is the New Black | Sophia Burset | Netflix |
| 2014 | Kaley Cuoco | The Big Bang Theory | Penny | CBS |
| 2014 | Merritt Wever | Nurse Jackie | Zoey Barkow, RN | Showtime |
| 2015 | Allison Janney | Mom | Bonnie Plunkett | CBS |
| 2015 | Mayim Bialik | The Big Bang Theory | Dr. Amy Farrah Fowler | CBS |
| 2015 | Carrie Brownstein | Portlandia | Various Characters | IFC |
| 2015 | Judith Light | Transparent | Shelly Pfefferman | Amazon Prime Video |
| 2015 | Melanie Lynskey | Togetherness | Michelle Pierson | HBO |
| 2015 | Eden Sher | The Middle | Sue Heck | ABC |
| 2016 (1) | Mayim Bialik | The Big Bang Theory | Dr. Amy Farrah Fowler | CBS |
| 2016 (1) | Kether Donohue | You're the Worst | Lindsay Jillian | FXX |
| 2016 (1) | Allison Janney | Mom | Bonnie Plunkett | CBS |
| 2016 (1) | Judith Light | Transparent | Shelly Pfefferman | Amazon Prime Video |
| 2016 (1) | Niecy Nash | Getting On | Denise "Didi" Ortley | HBO |
| 2016 (1) | Eden Sher | The Middle | Sue Heck | ABC |
| 2016 (2) | Jane Krakowski | Unbreakable Kimmy Schmidt | Jacqueline White | Netflix |
| 2016 (2) | Julie Bowen | Modern Family | Claire Dunphy | ABC |
| 2016 (2) | Anna Chlumsky | Veep | Amy Brookheimer | HBO |
| 2016 (2) | Allison Janney | Mom | Bonnie Plunkett | CBS |
| 2016 (2) | Judith Light | Transparent | Shelly Pfefferman | Amazon Prime Video |
| 2016 (2) | Allison Williams | Girls | Marnie Marie Michaels | HBO |
| 2018 | Mayim Bialik | The Big Bang Theory | Amy Farrah Fowler | CBS |
| 2018 | Alex Borstein | The Marvelous Mrs. Maisel | Susie Myerson | Amazon Prime Video |
| 2018 | Betty Gilpin | GLOW | Debbie "Liberty Belle" Eagan | Netflix |
| 2018 | Jenifer Lewis | Black-ish | Ruby Johnson | ABC |
| 2018 | Alessandra Mastronardi | Master of None | Francesca | Netflix |
| 2018 | Rita Moreno | One Day at a Time | Lydia Riera | Netflix |
| 2019 | Alex Borstein | The Marvelous Mrs. Maisel | Susie Myerson | Amazon Prime Video |
| 2019 | Betty Gilpin | GLOW | Debbie "Liberty Belle" Eagan | Netflix |
| 2019 | Laurie Metcalf | The Conners | Jackie Harris | ABC |
| 2019 | Rita Moreno | One Day at a Time | Lydia Riera | Netflix |
| 2019 | Zoe Perry | Young Sheldon | Mary Cooper | CBS |
| 2019 | Annie Potts | Young Sheldon | Constance "Connie" Tucker | CBS |
| 2019 | Miriam Shor | Younger | Diana Trout | TV Land |

=== 2020s ===
| Year | Actor | Role | Program | Network |
|---|---|---|---|---|
| 2020 | Alex Borstein | The Marvelous Mrs. Maisel | Susie Myerson | Amazon Prime Video |
| 2020 | D'Arcy Carden | The Good Place | Janet | NBC |
| 2020 | Sian Clifford | Fleabag | Claire | Amazon Prime Video |
| 2020 | Betty Gilpin | GLOW | Debbie "Liberty Belle" Eagan | Netflix |
| 2020 | Rita Moreno | One Day at a Time | Lydia Riera | Netflix |
| 2020 | Annie Murphy | Schitt's Creek | Alexis Rose | Pop |
| 2020 | Molly Shannon | The Other Two | Pat Dubek | Comedy Central |
| 2021 | Hannah Waddingham | Ted Lasso | Rebecca Welton | Apple TV+ |
| 2021 | Lecy Goranson | The Conners | Becky Conner | ABC |
| 2021 | Rita Moreno | One Day at a Time | Lydia Riera | Pop |
| 2021 | Ashley Park | Emily in Paris | Mindy Chen | Netflix |
| 2021 | Annie Murphy | Schitt's Creek | Alexis Rose | Pop |
| 2021 | Jaime Pressly | Mom | Jill Kendall | CBS |
| 2022 | Hannah Waddingham | Ted Lasso | Rebecca Welton | Apple TV+ |
| 2022 | Kristin Chenoweth | Schmigadoon! | Mildred Layton | Apple TV+ |
| 2022 | Hannah Einbinder | Hacks | Ava Daniels | HBO Max |
| 2022 | Molly Shannon | The Other Two | Pat Dubek | HBO Max |
| 2022 | Cecily Strong | Saturday Night Live | Various Characters | NBC |
| 2022 | Josie Totah | Saved By the Bell | Lexi Haddad-DeFabrizio | Peacock |
| 2023 | Sheryl Lee Ralph | Abbott Elementary | Barbara Howard | ABC |
| 2023 | Paulina Alexis | Reservation Dogs | Wilhelmina "Willie Jack" Jacqueline Sampson | FX |
| 2023 | Ayo Edebiri | The Bear | Sydney Adamu | FX |
| 2023 | Marcia Gay Harden | Uncoupled | Claire Lewis | Netflix |
| 2023 | Janelle James | Abbott Elementary | Ava Coleman | ABC |
| 2023 | Annie Potts | Young Sheldon | Constance "Connie" Tucker | CBS |
| 2024 | Meryl Streep | Only Murders in the Building | Loretta Durkin | Hulu |
| 2024 | Paulina Alexis | Reservation Dogs | Wilhelmina "Willie Jack" Jacqueline Sampson | FX |
| 2024 | Alex Borstein | The Marvelous Mrs. Maisel | Susie Myerson | Amazon Prime Video |
| 2024 | Janelle James | Abbott Elementary | Ava Coleman | ABC |
| 2024 | Sheryl Lee Ralph | Abbott Elementary | Barbara Howard | ABC |
| 2024 | Jessica Williams | Shrinking | Gaby | Apple TV+ |
| 2025 | Hannah Einbinder | Hacks | Ava Daniels | HBO / Max |
| 2025 | Liza Colón-Zayas | The Bear | Tina Marrero | FX / Hulu |
| 2025 | Janelle James | Abbott Elementary | Ava Coleman | ABC |
| 2025 | Stephanie Koenig | English Teacher | Gwen Sanders | FX |
| 2025 | Patti LuPone | Agatha All Along | Lilia Calderu | Disney+ |
| 2025 | Annie Potts | Young Sheldon | Connie "Meemaw" Tucker | CBS |
2026
| 2026 | Janelle James | Abbott Elementary | Ava Coleman | ABC |
| 2026 | Danielle Brooks | Peacemaker | Leota Adebayo | HBO Max |
| 2026 | Hannah Einbinder | Hacks | Ava Daniels | HBO Max |
| 2026 | Justine Lupe | Nobody Wants This | Samantha "Sam" Arondekar | CBS |
| 2026 | Ego Nwodim | Saturday Night Live | Various Characters | NBC |
| 2026 | Rebecca Wisocky | Ghosts | Henrietta "Hetty" Woodstone | CBS |

== Multiple wins and nominations ==
=== Multiple wins ===
2 wins

- Mayim Bialik
- Alex Borstein (consecutive)
- Allison Janney (consecutive)
- Hannah Waddingham (consecutive)

=== Multiple nominations ===
5 nominations

- Eden Sher

4 nominations

- Mayim Bialik
- Alex Borstein
- Janelle James
- Allison Janney
- Rita Moreno

3 nominations

- Julie Bowen
- Hannah Einbinder
- Betty Gilpin
- Judith Light
- Annie Potts

2 nominations

- Paulina Alexis
- Kaley Cuoco
- Jane Krakowski
- Annie Murphy
- Sheryl Lee Ralph
- Molly Shannon
- Hannah Waddingham
- Casey Wilson

== See also ==
- TCA Award for Individual Achievement in Comedy
- Primetime Emmy Award for Outstanding Supporting Actress in a Comedy Series
- Golden Globe Award for Best Supporting Actress – Series, Miniseries or Television Film
