= Anna Pigeon (TV series) =

American-Canadian television series

- Genre: Crime drama
- Created by: Morwyn Brebner
- Based on: the Anna Pigeon series by Nevada Barr
- Showrunner: Morwyn Brebner
- Starring: Tracy Spiridakos; Additional below
- Composer: Jonathan Goldsmith
- Countries of origin: United States; Canada
- Original language: English
- No. of seasons: 1
- No. of episodes: 10

Production
- Executive producers: Noelle Carbone; Lea Thompson; Morwyn Brebner; Todd Berger; Brett Burlock; Sonia Hosko; Julie Di Cresce; Peter Emerson; Gordon Gilbertson; Tom Cox; Jordy Randall
- Producer: Leslie Cowan
- Cinematography: Paul Sarossy
- Editor: Sandy Pereira
- Production companies: Cineflix Studios; December Films; SEVEN24 Films; Larkways Inc.; Buttermilk Sky Entertainment; Bell Media

Original release
- Network: USA Network (United States); Crave (Canada)
- Release: August 7, 2026 – present

Anna Pigeon is a Canadian-American crime drama television series, based on the novels of the same name by Nevada Barr. It is created by Morwyn Brebner, with Tracy Spiridakos playing the titular character. The series premiered on August 7, 2026, on USA Network (United States) and Crave (Canada) and was renewed for a second season.

== Premise ==
Anna Pigeon is a former city slicker who became a National Park Service park ranger after a devastating loss changed the trajectory of her life forever. While Anna tries to outrun her demons, her focus turns to solving crimes that have taken place within national park grounds, no matter who or what gets in her way.

== Cast and characters ==
- Tracy Spiridakos as Anna Pigeon, a National Park Service Law Enforcement Ranger at Glacier National Park (U.S.).
- Paulina Alexis as Zoey Bear Child
- Ronnie Rowe Jr. as Frederick Stanton, an FBI Agent and a friend of Anna.
- Crystle Lightning as Frieda Dierkz
- Cooper Levy as Jesse Garland
- Manuel Rodriguez-Saenz as Manny López
- Ryan Northcott as Geoff Miller, Glacier National Park Supervisor.
- Nikki Rae Hallow as Christina Clark
- Jordan Sledz as Zach Redhill
- Shaun Smyth as Harlan Roberts
- Tricia Helfer as Molly Pigeon, Anna's sister
- Kim Coates as Jeremiah D. Paulson
- Katelyn Bendico as Sarita
- Roger LeBlanc as Jake Davies
- Valerie Planche as Lori Grant
- Melanie Scrofano as Bethany López
- Jenny Raven as Guthrie
- Eric Regimbald as Ken Thompson
- Lori Bachynski as Lorraine Thompson
- Julian Black Antelope as Detective Wilton Fontaine
- Roger Cross as Pastor Nelson
- Stafford Perry as P.I.
- Rachael Ancheril as Romy
- Andy McQueen as Patrick Montgomery
- Kimberly-Sue Murray as Lainey
- Brett Donahue as Tom
- Sam Duke as JP
- Daniel Kash as Munro King
- Rae Farrer as Mira
- Krista Bridges as Danielle Boone
- Katharine King So as Taryn Wu
- Jennifer Dale as Maeve Boone
- Jim Watson as Lou
- Jake Epstein as Harold Garvey
- Charlotte Sullivan as Lady in Red
- Chad Rook as Dawson Wayze

== Episodes ==
| No. | Title | Directed by | Written by | Original release date | Viewers (millions) |
|---|---|---|---|---|---|
| 1 | "Track of the Cat" | Lea Thompson | Morwyn Brebner | August 7, 2026 | 1.07 |
| 2 | "Hide + Seek" | Lea Thompson | Mika Collins & Floyd Kane | August 14, 2026 | 0.83 |
| 3 | "The Preacher" | Matt Hastings | Marsha Greene | August 21, 2026 | 0.97 |
| 4 | "Hell Is Other People" | Matt Hastings | Sabrina Sherif | August 28, 2026 | 0.81 |
| 5 | "The Rope" | Samir Rehem | Noelle Carbone | September 4, 2026 | 0.96 |
| 6 | "There's Always a Road" | Samir Rehem | Shannon Masters | September 11, 2026 | 0.90 |
| 7 | "The Three Mark Skweikis" | Peter Stebbings | Morwyn Brebner | September 18, 2026 | 0.81 |
| 8 | "The Death Grin" | Peter Stebbings | Mika Collins & Marsha Greene | September 25, 2026 | 0.85 |
| 9 | "Nature vs. Nurture" | Lea Thompson | Noelle Carbone | October 2, 2026 | 1.02 |
| 10 | "SOS" | Lea Thompson | Morwyn Brebner | October 9, 2026 | 0.89 |

== Production ==
The USA Network ordered the drama series titled Anna Pigeon based on the novel series by Nevada Barr, with Morwyn Brebner serving as the showrunner and Lea Thompson as director. It is produced by Cineflix Studios, December Films and SEVEN24 Films, with filming having taken place Calgary, Alberta, Canada. The series is Bell Media's first co-commission with Versant's USA Network.

On July 29, 2025, Tracy Spiridakos was cast in the lead role of the series. On August 1, Ronnie Rowe Jr. joined the cast. On August 12, Paulina Alexis and Tricia Helfer joined the cast. On August 26, Kim Coates joined the cast in a recurring role.

In October 2026, the series was renewed for a second season.

== Release ==
On August 7, 2026, the series premiered on USA Network (United States), and Crave (Canada).
