= Inkwo for When the Starving Return =

2024 Canadian short film directed by Amanda Strong

- Film poster
- Directed by: Amanda Strong
- Screenplay by: Richard Van Camp; Amanda Strong; Bracken Hanuse Corlett
- Story by: Richard Van Camp
- Based on: "Wheetago War" by Richard Van Camp
- Produced by: Amanda Strong; Maral Mohammadian; Nina Werewka
- Starring: Paulina Alexis; Tantoo Cardinal; Art Napoleon
- Cinematography: Dean Holmes
- Edited by: Amanda Strong; Michael Bourquin
- Music by: Edo Van Breemen; Matthew Cardinal; Jeneen Frei Njootli
- Animation by: Anna Berezowsky; Juan Soto; Payton Curtis; Deanna Partridge-David
- Production company: National Film Board of Canada
- Release date: September 7, 2024 (TIFF)
- Running time: 18 minutes
- Country: Canada
- Language: English

Inkwo for When the Starving Return is a Canadian animated short film directed by Amanda Strong and released in 2024. Adapted from the short story "Wheetago War" (from his 2015 short story collection Night Moves) by Richard Van Camp, the film centres on Dove (Paulina Alexis), a young Indigenous orphan with the power to shift genders who has been raised by their aunt (Tantoo Cardinal), and must learn to harness their untrained skill in traditional Indigenous healing to save the world from dangerous wendigos.

The film premiered at the 2024 Toronto International Film Festival.

The film was named to TIFF's annual Canada's Top Ten list for 2024.
