= Mike Bone =

Indigenous HipHop Group

- Also known as: Lil Mike and Funny Bone
- Origin: Oklahoma City, Oklahoma
- Genre: Native American hip-hop
- Years active: 2010-present

Mike Bone is a rap duo composed of Pawnee-Choctaw brothers Lil Mike and Funny Bone. They describe themselves as believers in God and the gospel, and much of their music combines their value of dancing and expression with Biblical, faith-based teachings. The duo has toured North America for over 28 years, performing at conferences, concerts, and on America's Got Talent in 2013. They won a Native American Music Award for "Best Hip Hop Recording" for their album "Top Mike Bone Tracks - Vibin’" in 2025, and the two have appeared on FX’s Reservation Dogs as the twins Mose and Mekko.

== History ==
Lil Mike and Funny Bone were born in Oklahoma City, Oklahoma, in 1980 and 1986, respectively, and began rapping individually at age 12. The younger, Funny Bone, started working with Lil Mike as an intermission comedy act, hence his name, "Funny Bone", before moving on to performing with Lil Mike. Mike went by Lil Michael Jackson before he shortened his name to "Lil Mike". The two draw their inspiration from Vanilla Ice, MC Hammer, T-Bone, and the Gospel Gangsters, among others. Mike Bone has been performing for large audiences since they were young, with their first show being at the Oklahoma City State Fair. Funny Bone then went on to write the song "Rain Dance" for his graduation, and they eventually performed a remixed version of the song on America's Got Talent.

Throughout their younger years, both brothers experienced family hardships. By the age of 18, Lil Mike had been arrested 12 times and was involved in a gang. Both brothers experienced suicidal thoughts in their youth, and Lil Mike attempted suicide three times. Rap served as an outlet for both of them, and it was not long before their full-time job was spreading the gospel through their music. Their faith served as an escape from gang violence, allowing them to express themselves through dancing and writing poetry.

Mike Bone's passion for Christian rap began at an outreach show called "The Power Team." This outreach program had a group out on stage known as the Gospel Gangsters, who played their song called "Mobin". Little Mike and Funny Bone agree that this song changed their lives forever. They were both surprised that a group considered "gangster" or "hardcore" could still worship The Creator. Because of this, Little Mike and Funny Bone decided to search for more "hardcore" material and began working on their own music. As Little Mike and Funny Bone continued their faith-based music search, they were kicked out of churches for the way they worshipped.

== Artistry/genre ==
The brothers describe their music as focused on activism and uplifting the issues impacting Native American people, with songs directly confronting racism and the Missing and Murdered Indigenous Women crisis. Their faith also plays a central role in their themes and lyrics. Despite being labeled as Christian rappers, they are hesitant to use that term due to the historical trauma many Native people experienced.

In an NPR podcast with Jesse Thorn, Little Mike and Funny Bone mention that through their music, they aim to build a relationship with The Creator and attempt to find a way to encourage people to live a life of love rather than hate. Their interest in faith-based hip hop began after hearing the song, "Mobin", by the Gospel Gangsters.

== In other media ==
=== America's Got Talent ===
The brothers appeared on America's Got Talent (AGT) Season Eight in 2013. Mike Bone performed their song "Rain Dance" in their audition for the series and were voted in by all judges. The brothers were eliminated in the second round because the judges thought their performance was "poorly performed" and "unpracticed". The brothers claimed they intentionally performed poorly to be kicked off the show, stating they did not want to be under the fifteen-year contract with AGT if they were to make it to the live rounds, and that they just wanted the publicity from appearing on the show. Mike Bone described themselves as "half famous" before AGT, with their appearance pushing them into greater recognition.

=== Reservation Dogs ===
Lil Mike and Funny Bone appear as the members of a rap duo, Mose and Mekko in thirteen episodes across three seasons of Reservation Dogs. They ride bikes and kick scooters around the town, while acting as gossips and commenting on local events. The pair are the first in the show to refer to the four main protagonists as "Reservation Dogs" and are referred to as "Reservation's version of Rosencrantz and Guildenstern" by Popsugar.

=== Podcast appearances ===
The duo make frequent appearances on podcasts, speaking both about their faith-based music and journey and about their roles on Reservation Dogs. Some notable examples include, but are not limited to:

- Bullseye with Jesse Thorn by NPR Networks
- Powwows.com with Stacy Felix
- The Native Opinion Podcast
- Beyond the Art Podcast

== Discography ==
All singles and albums owned produced by Lil Mike & Funny Bone. While having been previously offered record deals, the pair have decided to remain independent to protect their creative freedom.

=== Albums ===
- Crunk Natives, released December 3, 2010
- Beat of the Drum, released January 7, 2018
- Vibin, released March 16, 2024

=== Singles ===
- "Fist in the Air," released February 21, 2020
- "That’s Enough," released August 16, 2021
- "Skoden," released March 7, 2022
- "(Thunder Song) Ready for the Game," September 26, 2025

== Awards and nominations ==
On July 14, 2025, the duo won the Native American Music Award (NAMA) for "Best Hip Hop Recording" with the performance of their "Top Mike Bone Tracks - Vibin".
