= Nature Poem =

2017 poem by Tommy Pico

- Author: Tommy Pico
- Language: English
- Genres: Poetry, Queer, Indigenous
- Published: 2017 Tin House
- Publisher: Tin House
- Publication place: USA
- Media type: Book
- Pages: 88
- ISBN: 978-1-941040-63-8

Nature Poem is a book-length poem written by Tommy Pico, a Native American poet born and raised on Viejas Indian Reservation of Kumeyaay nation. It was published by Tin House in 2017. It was preceded by the publication of IRL (2016), followed by both Junk (2018) and Feed (2019). Nature Poem was written in first-person narration following the character Teebs, a queer “NDN” (American Indian). Teebs is a fictional character, and a development of Pico’s alter-ego and performance persona. Teebs confronts the stereotypes put upon him by white colonialism, such as Indian Americans' association with nature, by refusing to write a nature poem.

== Development ==
Nature Poem was inspired by a line from Pico’s first book-length poem, IRL, where he wrote a poem about disliking nature poems. It was initially intended to be published as a zine.

Pico's writing frequently uses text-slang, hashtags, pop-culture references, and humor. Nature Poem was written as a series of individual poems meant to be read in sequence.

Often humorously, Teebs discusses dating, sex, and living as a queer person in the city.

Tommy Pico uses the character Teebs to show the life of a queer indigenous Indian.

Tommy Pico rewrites about the relationship between himself and nature.

People say Tommy Pico was late to the “gay poetry game”, Tommy Pico replies with he was right on time.

Tommy Pico calls out the monetization and colonization of the indigenous people where people think it’s appropriate to use indigenous culture for their own sake.

== Reviews ==
The New York Times Book Review wrote that Nature Poem was covertly political and engaging.

New York Journal of Books writes that this modern poem explores the tendency of American consumer society to view nature as a "cosmetic accessory," while also exploring the contradiction between Teebs' condemnation of "empty materialism" and his simultaneous "love letter" to it.

LAMBDA Literary writes that Nature Poem questions what is considered appropriate nature poetry and ensures that while searching for a nature poem within the book, readers are confronted with Teebs' experiences of "domestic violence, structural poverty, environmental racism, and nuclear disaster."

Award winning American Poet Eileen Myles states, "Mix of hey that’s poetry (uncanny resistance) with hey that’s a text and smashing goals & fulfilling them along the way & saying my parents fulfilled them. Doing it differently being alive & an artist. I love this work. Unpredictable & sweet & strong to continue."

The Los Angeles Review of Books wrote of Nature Poem: "Pico’s work is, in parts, a rose at the altar of the international decolonial movement, imagining what our LGBT and the broader community of marginalized Americans look like if we were to shake ourselves of our bourgeois comforts of the Obama Era and truly resist (purposefully un-hashtagged)."

Nature Poem was a Publishers Weekly Pick of the Week for May 8, 2017.

== Awards ==
- Nature Poem won a 2018 American Book Award.
- Nature Poem was a finalist in the LAMBDA Literary Award for Gay Poetry in 2018.
- Finalist for the 2019 Lambda Literary Award, Feed (Tin House Books, 2019),”
