= Tommy Pico =

Native American writer

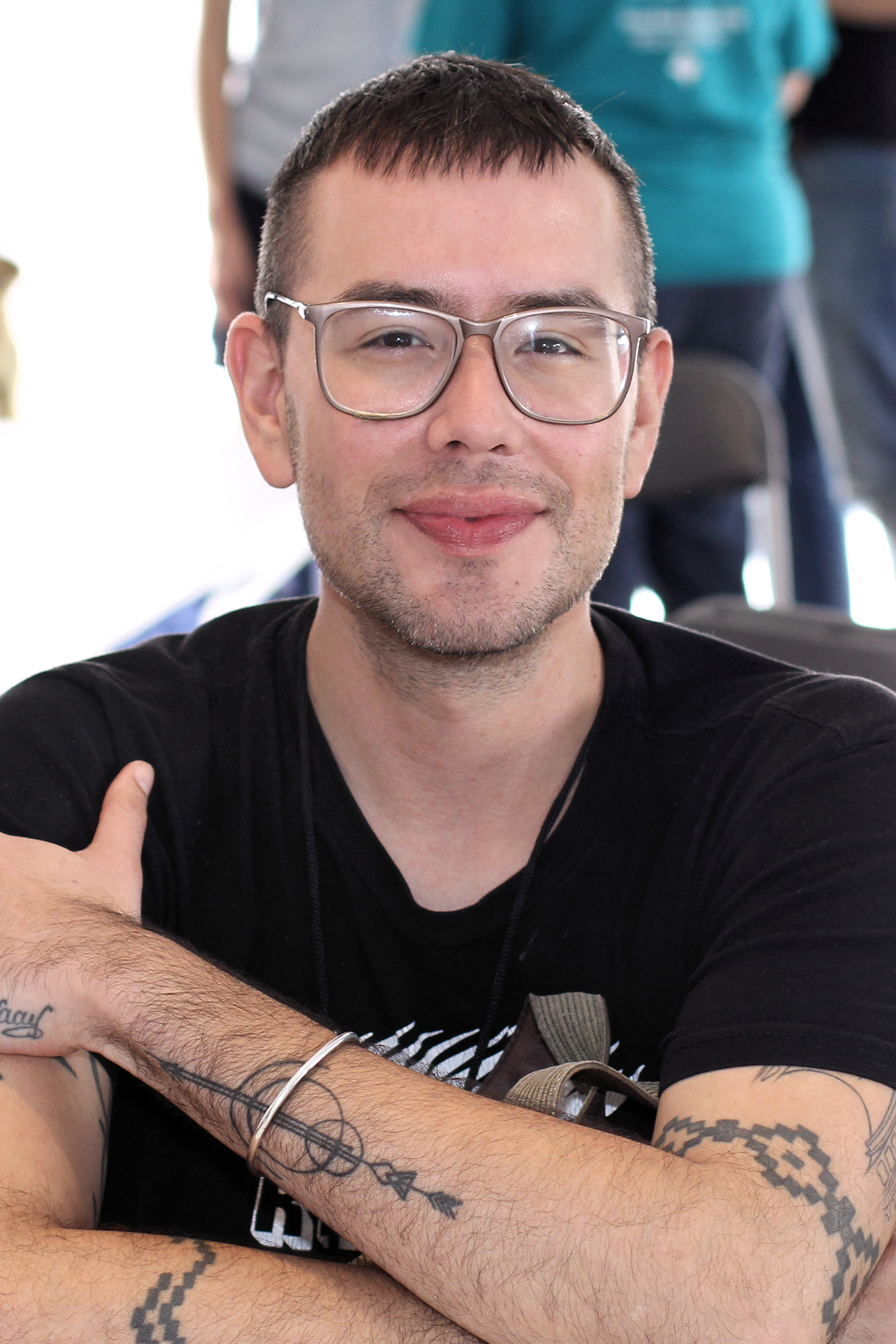
- Pico at the 2018 Texas Book Festival
- Born: December 13, 1983 (age 42); Viejas Reservation, California, United States
- Occupations: Writer, poet, and podcast host
- Notable work: IRL, Nature Poem

Tommy Pico (born December 13, 1983) is an American writer, poet, and podcast host.

== Early life ==
Pico grew up on the Viejas Reservation of the Viejas Group of Capitan Grande Band of Mission Indians, a Kumeyaay tribe near San Diego. His father was a tribal chairman. At age five, Pico started writing comics, and as a teenager he created zines and wrote poetry. His name in Kumeyaay means "bird song".

Pico attended Sarah Lawrence College, where he studied pre-med with the intention of returning to the reservation as a doctor. He decided not to pursue medicine and moved to New York City, where he worked as a barista in Williamsburg and started writing poetry.

In 2008, Pico lived in Bushwick, Brooklyn. In 2019, Pico moved to Los Angeles with a friend of his.

== Work ==
In 2011, Pico was an inaugural mentor in the Queer/Art/Mentors programme; in 2013 he was a Lambda Literary Fellow in Poetry.

In 2016, Pico's first book IRL was published by the small press Birds, LLC. IRL is written as one long text message, drawing on the epic tradition. Pico's poem was written in first-person narration, from the perspective of Teebs. Teebs is a fictional character writing about fictional events, however, the character parallels as Pico's alter-ego and is used as a nickname. IRL received critical acclaim and was included on best-of-the-year lists for 2016. In 2017, it received the Brooklyn Public Library Literary Prize.

Pico's second book, Nature Poem was published in 2017 by Tin House. Nature Poem, like IRL, was written from the perspective of Pico's alter ego and fictional character, Teebs. Pico again used the epic format, in this case to explore and challenge stereotypes of Native Americans as "noble savages" who are one with nature. Nature Poem also received critical acclaim. Pico followed Nature Poem with Junk in 2018 and Feed in 2019. Pico considers his four books as a series called the "Teebs tetralogy".

Pico co-curates the live reading series Poets With Attitude with Morgan Parker, and he is the co-host of the podcast Food 4 Thot, a podcast about queer identity, race, sex, relationships, literature, and pop culture. He is also the co-host of the podcast Scream, Queen! with Drea Washington. Scream, Queen discusses marginalized people and horror films. He also appears in the 2022 documentary series Queer for Fear: The History of Queer Horror.

In 2018, Pico was commissioned to create soundscapes for New York City's High Line park and a walking tour of Seattle for Vignettes Gallery and Gramma Press.

He has written for TV shows including Reservation Dogs and Resident Alien. Pico was chosen as a 2021 Sundance Institute Fellow.

== Awards ==
In 2017, Pico's debut IRL received the Brooklyn Public Library Literary Prize. his second book, Nature Poem, was the winner of a 2018 American Book Award and finalist for the 2018 Lambda Literary Award. He was a 2018 Whiting Award Winner for poetry.

== Bibliography ==
- IRL (2016, Birds, LLC: ISBN 9780991429868)
- Nature Poem (2017, Tin House: ISBN 9781941040638)
- Junk (2018, Tin House: ISBN 9781941040973)
- Feed (2019, Tin House: ISBN 978-1-947793-57-6)
