= Paulina Alexis =

First Nations actress (born 1999/2000)

- Born: 1999 or 2000 (age 25–26); Alexis Nakota Sioux Nation Reserve, Alberta, Canada
- Other name: Wagiya Cizhan/Young Eagle
- Occupation: Actress
- Years active: 2019–present
- Known for: Reservation Dogs, Bones of Crows, Ghostbusters: Afterlife, Beans
- Children: 1

Paulina Jewel Alexis, also known as Wǎgíyaŋ Čížaŋ or Young Eagle, is a First Nations (Alexis Nakota Sioux) actress best known for her role as Willie Jack in Reservation Dogs (2021–2023). She won the Independent Spirit Award for Best Ensemble Cast in a New Scripted Series in 2022 and in 2023 and 2024 was nominated for the Critics' Choice Award for Best Supporting Actress in a Comedy Series. The series won a Peabody Award.

Alexis was raised on a Alexis Nakota Sioux First Nation reserve in Alberta. As a child, she played hockey and attended school in Edmonton. At age 18, she landed her first professional film role as a minor character in Ghostbusters: Afterlife (2021), and later featured in the 2020 Canadian film Beans. She had her breakout role as Willie Jack on Reservation Dogs, a performance which garnered critical attention.

== Early life and education ==
Paulina Jewel Alexis, or Young Eagle, "Wǎgíyaŋ Čížaŋ" in Íhârne Stoney Nakoda, was born in 1999 or 2000 and raised on a Alexis Nakota Sioux First Nation reserve in Alberta, Canada. Her family tree includes Treaty 6, Treaty 7, and Treaty 8 Territories in Canada.

Alexis has discussed starting to play hockey at age four, regularly practicing during her childhood, and playing left wing as of 2021. She and her mother have also discussed her experiences growing up on the Alexis Nakota Sioux Nation reserve, and her experiences at school in Edmonton. Her father has made documentaries through his production company. Alexis has an older brother, Nathan, who played the role of Angus in Rhymes for Young Ghouls (2013) as well as two other brothers. During her childhood, Alexis went to many casting calls for commercials and acting roles; her first paid acting role was a driving commercial for which she was paid $100.

== Career ==
=== Early roles ===
Alexis landed her first professional acting role at age 18, playing a minor character in Ghostbusters: Afterlife. (Note: Filmed in 2019, but not released until 2021.) After signing with Nathan's agent, she had a video audition; director Jason Reitman was sufficiently impressed to invite her to a live audition. Alexis' next role was as April in the award-winning Canadian film Beans (2020), a semi-autobiographical story written and directed by Tracey Deer (Mohawk) about the Oka Crisis at Kanesatake, Quebec. Alexis has said that being on the set of Beans was incredibly fun, Deer allowed her to improvise some of her lines, and she met her future Reservation Dogs co-star D'Pharaoh Woon-a-tai.

=== Reservation Dogs ===
Alexis originally auditioned for the role of Elora, a female lead in Reservation Dogs, but Kawennáhere Devery Jacobs was chosen to play her. The showrunners asked Alexis to read for Willie Jack, who was originally a male character. The character was revised to be female when Alexis was cast. Alexis described developing her vision of Willie Jack for the audition process: "I just created Willie Jack how I think she would be, with her braids, she's always loud, with her bros, she loves hard, and just did it like that."

After Alexis was given the role, she was encouraged by the show producers to improvise lines for her character and helped develop the wardrobe. Alexis sometimes consulted with her brother on the development of lines for Willie Jack. In an interview with W, Alexis said, "I've grown up with a lot of strong people, so I wanted to represent that - to show that we do have hearts and we care about our people a lot. Showing that - and getting our humor, because we’re funny - was the mission."

According to Sophie Brookover at Vulture, over the course of the show, Willie Jack "emerged as the heart, conscience, and memory keeper of the group." Jenelle Riley writes for Variety, "It’s cliché to talk about young actors being older than their years, but Alexis delivers wisecracks with the timing of an old pro - her one-liners are as memorable as her hats."

=== Bones of Crows ===
Alexis is also featured as the character Immpy in the film Bones of Crows (2022), an inter-generational tale about a family of Indigenous women, who are living with the traumas inflicted by genocidal Indian residential schools.

=== Inkwo for When the Starving Return ===
Alexis had a voice acting role in Inkwo for When the Starving Return, a stop motion animation interpretation of Richard Van Camp's short story "The Wheetago", presented by Spotted Fawn Productions. Wheetago, also known as wendigo, are supernatural beings from Indigenous lore, and the name Wheetago translates to "body eater" in the Dene language, which the producers of the film say "have existed across indigenous cultures to teach us about greed". The producers confirmed in early 2023 that Alexis was cast as the gender-switching character Young Dove.

== Personal life ==
Alexis plays hockey, rides horses, and participates in horse relay races. Alexis has said that she thinks that being around horses benefits mental health. She announced her pregnancy through Instagram on August 18, 2024.

== Filmography ==
=== Film ===
Filmography: Film
Year	Title	Role	Director	Notes
2020	Beans	April	Tracey Deer	
2021	Ghostbusters: Afterlife	Bunny	Jason Reitman	Filmed in 2019
2022	Bones of Crows	Immpy	Marie Clements	
2024	Inkwo for When the Starving Return	Young Dove		Short film; voice acting
2026	Smudge the Blades	Jaycee Pipestem	Cody Lightning	

=== Television ===
Filmography: Television
Year	Title	Role	Notes
2021–2023	Reservation Dogs	Willie Jack	Main role
2024	Bob's Burgers	Ramona	Episode: "Saving Favorite Drive-In"
2025	The Lowdown	Willie Jack	Cameo appearance
2026–present	Anna Pigeon	Zoey Bear Child	

== Awards and nominations ==
Awards and nominations for Paulina Alexis
Year	Award	Category	Work	Result
2022	Independent Spirit Awards	Best Ensemble Cast in a New Scripted Series (Shared with the cast)	Reservation Dogs	Won
2022	Pena de Prata	Best Ensemble in a Comedy Series (Shared with the cast)	Reservation Dogs	Won
2023	Critics' Choice Television Awards	Best Supporting Actress in a Comedy Series	Reservation Dogs	Nominated
2024	Critics' Choice Television Awards	Best Supporting Actress in a Comedy Series	Reservation Dogs	Nominated
