= Mystic Familiar =

Studio album by Dan Deacon
- Released: January 31, 2020
- Genres: Neo-psychedelia, glitch pop, noise pop, IDM
- Length: 43:39
- Label: Domino Recording Company
- Producer: Dan Deacon

Dan Deacon chronology
Gliss Riffer (2015)	Mystic Familiar (2020)

Professional ratings
Aggregate scores
Source	Rating
Metacritic	74/100
Review scores
Source	Rating
Beat Magazine	7/10
Crack	5/10
Loud and Quiet	8/10
Musikexpress	4/6 stars
Zero Music Magazine	8/10
Pitchfork	6.4/10

Mystic Familiar is the fifth studio album by the American electronic musician Dan Deacon.

== Background ==
Mystic Familiar marked Dan Deacon's first solo studio record since 2015's Gliss Riffer. In the intervening years, Deacon had toured heavily and focused on other collaborative projects such as the 2017 ballet The Times Are Racing with New York City Ballet resident choreographer Justin Peck, a 2019 performance with the Baltimore Symphony Orchestra, and scoring feature films such as Theo Anthony's Rat Film and Finlay Pretsell's Time Trial. Deacon also produced and co-wrote the 2018 album Riddles by Ed Schrader's Music Beat.

In addition to finding new inspiration in these collaborative projects, during the recording of Mystic Familiar Deacon had begun regular practices of meditation and therapy, and began to use the Oblique Strategies cards created by Brian Eno and Peter Schmidt as creative prompts. Deacon has also cited David Lynch and his book Catching the Big Fish as an inspiration on the writing and recording of Mystic Familiar.

== Release ==
A first video from the album, for the song "Sat by a Tree" starring Aparna Nancherla, was released October 29, 2019. The second single from Mystic Familiar, "Become a Mountain," was released on January 13, 2020, with a video by animation studio Rapapawn.

== Reception ==
In his review for AllMusic (in which its editorial staff rated the album 4 stars), Paul Simpson characterized Mystic Familiar as Deacon's return to "majestically arranged synth pop," characterizing its arrangements as "driving and full of excitement" and finding the album's lyrical themes of nature and inner peace "encouraging and empowering without relying on self-help clichés." For Under the Radar, Scott Dransfield noted that Mystic Familiar is "far and away his most personal work yet," and concluded that "the best thing about Mystic Familiar is how the beautiful composition of the music reinforces the power of the lyrics' message."

== Track listing ==
All tracks are written, produced, and mixed by Dan Deacon. "Bumble Bee Crown King" is co-written by Dustin Wong.

Mystic Familiar – Volume One
No.	Title	Length
1.	"Become a Mountain"	4:05
2.	"Hypnagogic"	1:33
3.	"Sat by a Tree"	4:27
4.	"Arp I: Wide Eyed"	2:08
5.	"Arp II: Float Away"	3:43
6.	"Arp III: Far from Shore"	4:36
7.	"Arp IV: Any Moment"	1:42
8.	"Weeping Birch"	4:23
9.	"Fell into the Ocean"	4:32
10.	"My Friend"	5:14
11.	"Bumble Bee Crown King"	7:23
Total length:		43:39

Mystic Familiar – Volume Two
No.	Title	Length
12.	"Become a Mountain" (Edit)	3:36
13.	"Sat by a Tree" (Edit)	3:54
14.	"Arp I: Wide Eyed & Arp II: Float Away" (Edit)	4:18
15.	"Arp III: Far from Shore" (Edit)	3:58
16.	"Fell Into the Ocean" (Edit)	3:59
17.	"My Friend" (Edit)	4:25
Total length:		68:00

== See also ==
- List of 2020 albums
- Music of Baltimore
