= Dan Deacon: U.S.A. =

- Off the Air episode
- Still from footage of a bighorn sheep from El hombre y la Tierra, superimposed on the animated short Radical Updates by Andrew Benson.
- Directed by: Dave Hughes
- Editing by: Dave Hughes; Cody DeMatteis (graphics)
- Original air date: July 6, 2013
- Running time: 22 minutes

Guest appearances
- Cody DeMatteis in Stone Mountain Ghillie Suits; Zach White in Stone Mountain Ghillie Suits

"Dan Deacon: U.S.A." (also known as the "Dan Deacon Special") is the first animated television special of the American anthology series Off the Air. The special was edited and directed by creator and executive producer Dave Hughes. The episode incorporates surreal footage of landscapes in the United States, with music by Dan Deacon from the album America. The special was commissioned by Williams Street Records as part of the Adult Swim 2013 Singles Program. The episode coincided with the release of another track by Deacon entitled "Why Am I on This Cloud?", featuring samples from other Adult Swim programming.

Promoted as a "one-time airing" by members of the production staff, the episode premiered on Adult Swim on July 6, 2013. The special was viewed by 962,000 viewers and received a 0.8 rating among adults between the ages of 18 and 49. The episode received positive critical reception from music journalist websites for its psychedelic visuals and uses of American iconography.

== Synopsis ==
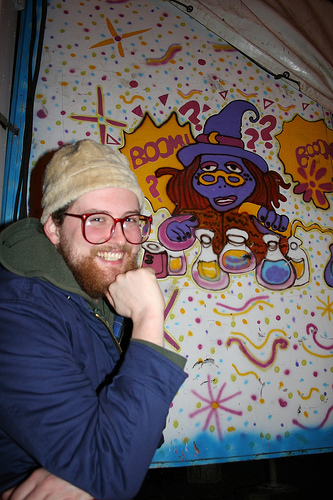
The episode features music by Dan Deacon (pictured) from the album America.

Similar to other episodes of Off the Air, the episode is presented without explanation or narration as a showcase of surreal animations, viral internet videos, archival footage and morphing psychedelic imagery, arranged around a single loose theme and blended without pause into a single continuous presentation. Excluding its closing credits, the special features the last four tracks from the album America by Dan Deacon (referred to as the "'U.S.A.' suite"). The episode incorporates the following works, which center on landscapes in the United States:

1. El hombre y la Tierra excerpt
2. Radical Updates by Andrew Benson
3. Cityscape Chicago by Eric Hines
4. Space Station footage provided by Image Science and Analysis Laboratory at the NASA John Space Center
5. Groosland by Dutch National Ballet (Note: Footage provided by Poorhouse International, Ltd.)
6. CGI space objects by Adam Bruneau
7. American Harvest provided by Prelinger Archives
8. Head On by Lior Ben Horin
9. Murmuration by Liberty Smith and Sophie Windsor Clive
10. Cy's Sunrise Lefts by Cyrus Sutton and Korduroy.tv
11. Moonwalk performance by Dean Potter (Note: Cinematography by Reel Walter Productions, Ltd.)
12. Primavera Concert Footage by Tom Bingham, Gill Austin, Jonathan Rej, and Jeff Crocker
13. Stone Mountain Ghillie Suits; cinematography by Alan Steadman, featuring Cody DeMatteis and Zach White
14. Additional stock footage provided by iStock and Pond5

== Production ==
The episode was produced by Williams Street Records as part of the Adult Swim 2013 Singles Program. Director and editor Dave Hughes had previously collaborated with Deacon in 2008 for his song "Okie Dokie" from the album Spiderman of the Rings. The short film Head On by Lior Ben Horin was featured in the a previous episode of the series entitled "Color". According to Hughes, the special was commissioned to coincide with the release of Deacon's track for the compilation album. Deacon's track was released on William Street Record's website on June 26, 2013; entitled "Why Am I on This Cloud?", the song features samples from other Adult Swim programming. Despite the special's national focus, the episode culls works from artists worldwide.

Hughes, along with associate producer Cody DeMatteis, utilized Adobe After Effects for some aspects of post-production editing. The special makes extensive use of compression artifacts for artistic effect, namely "datamoshing", where two videos are interleaved so intermediate frames are interpolated from two separate sources. The technique referred to as "photo stacking", in which time-lapse photographs are composited on top of one another, was also utilized for the NASA John Space Center footage.

== Broadcast and reception ==
"Dan Deacon: U.S.A." aired on July 6, 2013 on Cartoon Network's late-night programming block, Adult Swim. Promoted as a "one-time airing" by members of the production staff, the episode was broadcast as part of DVR Theater at 4 a.m.; former episodes of the series aired in the 4 a.m. timeslot preceding the premiere of the special as well. The special was viewed by 962,000 viewers and received a 0.8 Nielsen rating in the 18–49 demographic. The episode was previously released onto Adult Swim's website on July 1, 2013; it was published on Adult Swim's official YouTube channel on July 3.

Critical reception was positive, especially from music journalist websites, who praised its psychedelic visuals and uses of American iconography. Consequence of Sound's Michael Roffman compared the scenic visuals to Koyaanisqatsi and 2001: A Space Odyssey. Exclaim! magazine's Alex Hudson called the special accompanied by the soundtrack "ambitious and shapeshifting", but described some of the CGI featured as "corny". Jamie Milton of This Is Fake DIY described the episode as a "bold slice of national pride, beloved to the landscapes that inspired the making of the excitable producer's latest album". In his review, he compared it to the theory of "Broken Britain" in the United Kingdom, stating between the special and "a 20 minute documentary about 'Broken Britain', you know which one you should go for." An article by Fact magazine described the episode as a compilation of "eye-popping scenes."

Nancy Hoang of CMJ praised the episode's visuals, highlighting the incorporation of the short film Murmuration by Liberty Smith and Sophie Windsor Clive. Chris Martins of Spin magazine enjoyed the colorful and psychedelic visuals. He found the episode appealing to stoner culture, ending his review stating that the special is "tailor-made for late nights in haze-filled dorm rooms." Tom Breihan of Stereogum reviewed the special positively, calling the episode an "oddly patriotic work that pulls in all sorts of American iconography". Rachel Haas of Paste magazine praised the special being released close to Independence Day, stating "this suite would possibly soundtrack the coolest, weirdest fireworks show ever." Leor Galil of the Chicago Reader featured the video for his "12 O'Clock Track", praising Hughes' manipulation of Cityscape Chicago by cinematographer Eric Hines. However, given the tracks' length, he argued the episode would best be enjoyed "through a nice pair of speakers at a barbecue instead of spending that time with your eyes affixed to a computer screen."
