= 2021 Sundance Film Festival =

Film festival

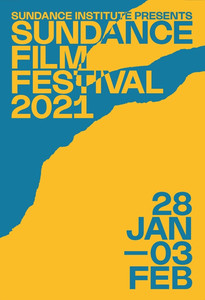
- Festival poster
- Location: Park City, Utah
- Founded: 1978
- Hosted by: Sundance Institute
- No. of films: 72
- Festival date: January 28 to February 3, 2021
- Language: English
- Website: sundance.org/festival
- 2022 Sundance Film Festival 2020 Sundance Film Festival

The 2021 Sundance Film Festival took place from January 28 to February 3, 2021. The first lineup of competition films was announced on December 15, 2020. Due to the COVID-19 pandemic in Utah, the festival combined in-person screenings at the Ray Theatre in Park City, with screenings held online as well as on screens and drive-ins in 24 states and territories across the United States.

== Films ==
=== U.S. Dramatic Competition ===
- CODA, written and directed by Siân Heder
- I Was a Simple Man, written and directed by Christopher Makoto Yogi
- Jockey, directed and co-written by Clint Bentley
- John and the Hole, directed by Pascual Sisto
- Mayday, written, directed and co-produced by Karen Cinorre
- On the Count of Three, directed by Jerrod Carmichael
- Passing, written, directed and produced by Rebecca Hall
- Superior, directed by Erin Vassilopoulos
- Together Together, written and directed by Nikole Beckwith
- Wild Indian, written and directed by Lyle Mitchell Corbine Jr.

=== U.S. Documentary Competition ===
- Ailey, directed and co-produced by Jamila Wignot
- All Light, Everywhere, written and directed by Theo Anthony
- At the Ready, directed by Maisie Crow
- Cusp, directed by Parker Hill and Isabel Bethencourt
- Homeroom, directed and co-produced by Peter Nicks
- Rebel Hearts, directed, co-written and co-edited by Pedro Kos
- Rita Moreno: Just a Girl Who Decided to Go for It, directed, co-produced and co-edited by Mariem Pérez Riera
- Summer of Soul, directed by Questlove
- Try Harder!, directed and co-produced by Debbie Lum
- Users, directed by Natalia Almada

=== Premieres ===
- Amy Tan: Unintended Memoir, directed by James Redford
- Bring Your Own Brigade, written, produced and directed by Lucy Walker
- The Cursed (original festival title: Eight for Silver), written and directed by Sean Ellis
- How It Ends, written, directed and produced by Daryl Wein and Zoe Lister-Jones
- In the Earth, written and directed by Ben Wheatley
- In the Same Breath, directed and co-produced by Nanfu Wang
- Judas and the Black Messiah, directed and co-written by Shaka King
- Land, directed by Robin Wright
- Marvelous and the Black Hole, directed by Kate Tsang
- Mass, written and directed by Fran Kranz
- The Most Beautiful Boy in the World, written and directed by Kristina Lindström and Kristian Petri
- My Name Is Pauli Murray, directed by Betsy West and Julie Cohen
- Philly D.A., directed by Ted Passon, Yoni Brook and Nicole Salazard
- Prisoners of the Ghostland, directed by Sion Sono
- The Sparks Brothers, directed by Edgar Wright
- Street Gang: How We Got to Sesame Street, directed by Marilyn Agrelo

=== World Cinema Dramatic Competition ===
- The Dog Who Wouldn't Be Quiet, directed by Ana Katz
- El Planeta, written and directed by Amalia Ulman
- Fire in the Mountains, written and directed by Ajitpal Singh
- Hive, written and directed by Blerta Basholli
- Human Factors, written and directed by Ronny Trocker
- Luzzu, written and directed by Alex Camilleri
- One for the Road, directed by Nattawut Poonpiriya
- The Pink Cloud, written and directed by Iuli Gerbase
- Pleasure, written and directed by Ninja Thyberg
- Prime Time, directed and co-written by Jakub Piątek

=== World Cinema Documentary Competition ===
- Faya Dayi, written, directed and produced by Jessica Beshir
- Flee, directed and co-written by Jonas Poher Rasmussen
- Misha and the Wolves, directed by Sam Hobkinson
- The Most Beautiful Boy in the World, written and directed by Kristina Lindström and Kristian Petri
- Playing with Sharks, directed by Sally Aitken
- President, directed by Camilla Nielsson
- Sabaya, directed and edited by Hogir Hirori
- Taming the Garden, directed by Salomé Jashi
- Writing with Fire, directed by Rintu Thomas and Sushmit Ghosh

=== Midnight ===
- Censor, directed and co-written by Prano Bailey-Bond
- Knocking, directed by Frida Kempff
- A Glitch in the Matrix, directed by Rodney Ascher
- Coming Home in the Dark, directed and co-written by James Ashcroft
- Mother Schmuckers, written and directed by Lenny Guit and Harpo Guit
- Violation, written and directed by Madeleine Sims-Fewer and Dusty Mancinelli

=== Next ===
- The Blazing World, directed and co-written by Carlson Young
- Cryptozoo, written and directed by Dash Shaw
- First Date, written and directed by Manuel Crosby and Darren Knapp
- Ma Belle, My Beauty, directed by Marion Hill
- R#J, directed and co-written by Carey Williams
- Searchers, directed by Pacho Velez
- Son of Monarchs, written and directed by Alexis Gambis
- Strawberry Mansion, written and directed by Albert Birney and Kentucker Audley
- We're All Going to the World's Fair, written, directed and edited by Jane Schoenbrun

=== Spotlight ===
- Night of the Kings, directed by Philippe Lacôte
- The World to Come, directed by Mona Fastvold

=== Shorts ===
==== U.S. Fiction ====
- Ava from My Class, directed by Youmin Kang
- Bambirak, directed by Zamarin Wahdat
- BJ's Mobile Gift Shop, directed by Jason Park
- Bruiser, directed by Miles Warren
- Don't Go Tellin' Your Momma, directed by Topaz Jones, rubberband.
- Doublespeak, directed by Hazel McKibbin
- i ran from it and was still in it, directed by Darol Olu Kae
- In the Air Tonight, directed by Andrew Norman Wilson
- LATA, directed by Alisha Mehta
- Raspberry, directed by Julian Doan
- The Touch of the Master's Hand, directed by Gregory Barnes
- White Wedding, directed by Melody C Roscher
- Wiggle Room, directed by Sam Guest and Julia Baylis
- Yoruga, directed by Federico Torrado Tobón
- You Wouldn't Understand, directed by Trish Harnetiaux

==== International Fiction ====
- The Affected, directed by Rikke Gregersen
- Black Bodies, directed by Kelly Fyffe-Marshall
- The Criminals, directed by Serhat Karaaslan
- Excuse Me, Miss, Miss, Miss, directed by Sonny Calvento
- Five Tiger, directed by Nomawonga Khumalo
- Flex, directed by Josefin Malmén, David Strindberg
- Like the Ones I Used to Know (Les Grandes claques), directed by Annie St-Pierre
- Lizard, directed by Akinola Davies Jr.
- The Longest Dream I Remember, directed by Carlos Lenin
- Mountain Cat, directed by Lkhagvadulam Purev-Ochir
- Unliveable, directed by Matheus Farias and Enock Carvalho
- The Unseen River, directed by Phạm Ngọc Lân
- We're Not Animals, directed by Noé Debré

==== Non-Fiction ====
- A Concerto Is a Conversation, directed by Ben Proudfoot and Kris Bowers
- Dear Philadelphia, directed by Renee Osubu
- The Field Trip, directed by Meghan O'Hara, Mike Attie and Rodrigo Ojeda-Beck
- My Own Landscapes, directed by Antoine Chapon
- The Rifleman, directed by Sierra Pettengill
- Snowy, directed by Kaitlyn Schwalje and Alex Wolf Lewis
- Spirits and Rocks: An Azorean Myth, directed by Aylin Gökmen
- Tears Teacher, directed by Noemie Nakai
- This Is the Way We Rise, directed by Ciara Lacy
- To Know Her, directed by Natalie Chao
- When We Were Bullies, written, directed and produced by Jay Rosenblatt
- Up at Night, directed by Nelson Makengo

==== Animation ====
- The Fire Next Time, directed by Renaldho Pelle
- Forever, directed by Mitch McGlocklin
- The Fourfold, directed by Alisi Telengut
- Ghost Dogs, directed by Joe Cappa
- GNT, directed by Sara Hirner and Rosemary Vasquez-Brown
- KKUM, directed by Kang-min Kim
- Little Miss Fate, directed by Joder von Rotz
- Misery Loves Company, directed by Sasha Lee
- Souvenir Souvenir, directed by Bastien Dubois
- Trepanation, directed by Nick Flaherty

== Awards ==
The following awards were given out:

=== Grand Jury Prizes ===
- U.S. Dramatic Competition – CODA (Siân Heder)
- U.S. Documentary Competition – Summer of Soul (Ahmir “Questlove” Thompson)
- World Cinema Dramatic Competition – Hive (Blerta Basholli)
- World Cinema Documentary Competition – Flee (Jonas Poher Rasmussen)

=== Audience Awards ===
- U.S. Dramatic Competition – CODA (Siân Heder)
- U.S. Documentary Competition – Summer of Soul (Ahmir “Questlove” Thompson)
- World Cinema Dramatic Competition – Hive (Blerta Basholli)
- World Cinema Documentary Competition – Writing with Fire (Rintu Thomas and Sushmit Ghosh)
- NEXT – Ma Belle, My Beauty (Marion Hill)

=== Directing, Screenwriting and Editing ===
- U.S. Dramatic Competition – Siân Heder for CODA
- U.S. Documentary Competition – Natalia Almada for Users
- World Cinema Dramatic Competition – Blerta Basholli for Hive
- World Cinema Documentary Competition – Hogir Hirori for Sabaya
- Waldo Salt Screenwriting Award – Ari Katcher and Ryan Welch for On the Count of Three
- Jonathan Oppenheim Editing Award: U.S. Documentary – Kristina Motwani and Rebecca Adorno for Homeroom
- NEXT Innovator Price - Dash Shaw for Cryptozoo

=== Special Jury Prizes ===
- U.S. Dramatic Special Jury Award for Ensemble Cast – The cast of CODA
- U.S. Dramatic Special Jury Award: Best Actor - Clifton Collins Jr. for Jockey
- U.S. Documentary Special Jury Award: Emerging Filmmaker - Parker Hill and Isabel Bethencourt for Cusp
- U.S. Documentary Special Jury Award: Nonfiction Experimentation - Theo Anthony for All Light, Everywhere
- World Cinema Documentary Special Jury Award: Vérité Filmmaking - Camilla Nielsson for President
- World Cinema Documentary Special Jury Award: Impact for Change - Rintu Thomas and Sushmit Ghosh for Writing with Fire
- World Cinema Dramatic Special Jury Award: Acting - Jesmark Scicluna for Luzzu
- World Cinema Dramatic Special Jury Award: Creative Vision - Baz Poonpiriya for One for the Road

=== Short Film Awards ===
- Short Film Grand Jury Prize - Lizard
- Short Film Jury Award: U.S. Fiction - The Touch of the Master's Hand
- Short Film Jury Award: International Fiction - Bambirak
- Short Film Jury Award: Nonfiction - Don't Go Tellin' Your Momma
- Short Film Jury Award: Animation - Souvenir Souvenir
- Short Film Special Jury Award for Acting - Wiggle Room
- Short Film Special Jury Award for Screenwriting - The Criminals

=== Special Prizes ===
- Alfred P. Sloan Feature Film Prize - Son of Monarchs
- Sundance Institute/Amazon Studios Producers Award for Nonfiction - Nicole Salazar for Philly D.A.
- Sundance Institute/Amazon Studios Producers Award for Fiction - Natalie Qasabian for Run
- Sundance Institute/Adobe Mentorship Award for Editing Nonfiction - Juli Vizza
- Sundance Institute/Adobe Mentorship Award for Editing Fiction - Terilyn Shropshire
- Sundance Institute/NHK Award - Meryam Joobeur for Motherhood

== Acquisitions ==
Sources:

- Ailey: Neon
- All Light, Everywhere: Super LTD
- Bring Your Own Brigade: CBSN
- Censor: Magnet Releasing (US distribution); Vertigo Releasing (UK distribution)
- CODA: Apple TV+
- Cryptozoo: Magnolia Pictures
- Cusp: Showtime Documentary Films
- El Planeta: Utopia
- Faya Dayi: MUBI (select territories, including UK and Latin America)
- First Date: Magnet Releasing
- Flee: Neon and Participant (US distribution); Curzon Artificial Eye (UK distribution); Haut et Court (French distribution)
- A Glitch in the Matrix: Magnolia Pictures (US distribution); Dogwoof (UK distribution)
- Hive: Zeitgeist Films and Kino Lorber (US distribution)
- Homeroom: Hulu (US distribution)
- How It Ends: American International Pictures (US distribution; through United Artists Releasing)
- I Was a Simple Man: Strand Releasing
- Jockey: Sony Pictures Classics
- John and the Hole: IFC Films
- Luzzu: Kino Lorber (US distribution); Peccadillo Pictures (UK distribution)
- Marvelous and the Black Hole: FilmRise
- Mayday: Magnolia Pictures
- Misha and the Wolves: Netflix (US distribution); BBC Storyville (UK distribution)
- The Most Beautiful Boy in the World: Juno Films
- On the Count of Three: Annapurna Pictures and Orion Pictures (US distribution; through United Artists Releasing)
- Passing: Netflix
- Playing with Sharks: National Geographic Documentary Films
- Pleasure: A24 (later acquired by NEON)
- Prisoners of the Ghostland: RLJE Films
- Rebel Hearts: Discovery+
- Rita Moreno: Just a Girl Who Decided to Go for It: Roadside Attractions
- The Sparks Brothers: Focus Features (US distribution); Universal Pictures (International distribution)
- Strawberry Mansion: Music Box Films (US distribution); Alief (International distribution)
- Street Gang: How We Got to Sesame Street: Screen Media Films (US distribution); LevelFilm (Canada)
- Summer of Soul: Searchlight Pictures and Hulu (worldwide); Star (select territories)
- Superior: Factory 25 (US distribution); Visit Films (international sales); Creative Artists Agency (US sales)
- Together Together: Bleecker Street (US distribution); Sony Pictures Worldwide Acquisitions (International distribution)
- Violation: Shudder
- We're All Going to the World's Fair: HBO Max and Utopia
- Wiggle Room: Searchlight Pictures
- Wild Indian: Vertical Entertainment
