= Off the Air (TV series) =

American psychedelic anthology television series

- Genre: Psychedelic; Anthology
- Created by: Dave Hughes
- Country of origin: United States
- No. of seasons: 15
- No. of episodes: 54 (and 3 specials) (list of episodes)

Production
- Executive producers: Dave Hughes (Note: Hughes is credited as executive producer for every episode except "Animals" and "Food" which instead carry a "produced by" credit to Million Monkeys Inc.); Keith Crofford; Mike Lazzo; Michael Ouweleen (Note: Ouweleen is executive producer starting with "Progress".)
- Producers: Cody DeMatteis; Alan Steadman; Lisa M. Thomas; Melissa Warrenburg
- Running time: 10–12 minutes
- Production companies: Williams Street; Million Monkeys Inc.

Original release
- Network: Adult Swim
- Release: January 1, 2011 – present

Off the Air is an American psychedelic anthology television series created by Dave Hughes for Cartoon Network's nighttime programming block Adult Swim. The series is presented without explanation or narration as a showcase of surreal footage arranged around a single loose theme (expressed in the episode title) and blended without pause into a single continuous presentation. The series premiered on Adult Swim on January 1, 2011, 4:00 am New Year's Day.

Hughes is a former employee of MTV Animation who first pitched it to Mike Lazzo at Adult Swim after producing a video mixtape for the network's 2010 Carnival Tour event. As a result of its 4 a.m. graveyard slot and small selection of episodes, the series remains relatively unknown on the network, but has been received positively and dubbed a cult phenomenon by critics and Adult Swim itself.

The series has aired 54 episodes and 3 specials over the course of 15 seasons, including two episodes, "Technology" (by Wham City) and "Paradise" (by Ghosting.tv), that Adult Swim announced on October 13, 2017, would air in late 2017. On December 31, 2019, Dave Hughes tweeted that the episode "Patterns" was the "last [one] for now", indicating that the series had been put on hiatus until further notice. Following this, the show received six more seasons: season 10 on June 9, 2020; season 11 on October 12, 2021; season 12 on July 4, 2022; season 13 on December 19, 2023; season 14 on December 17, 2024; and season 15 on December 30, 2025.

== Synopsis ==
Screenshot from the first episode "Animals", showing morphing psychedelic imagery between two clips

The series is presented without explanation or narration as a showcase of surreal footage—animations, short films, music videos, viral videos, film, and television clips, stock footage and morphing psychedelic imagery—arranged around a single loose theme (expressed in the episode title) and blended without pause into a single continuous presentation.

== Production ==
Series creator Dave Hughes first started working for Williams Street in 2003 after an eight-year stint with MTV Animation, where he had edited series such as Beavis and Butt-Head and Celebrity Deathmatch. Hughes, who considered Adult Swim to be "slipping away from its more experimental roots" as it got popular, had the concept for Off the Air in mind before, but never thought he would be the one to make it. While living in New York, 120 Minutes, Concrete TV, Liquid Television and Night Flight were among some of the experimental programming that exposed him "to a whole new world of ideas, music and people that I just didn't see anywhere else on television."

Hughes first pitched the series to the network through Mike Lazzo at Adult Swim sometime after late 2009, after producing a video mixtape that would be projected behind musical performers for the network's 2010 Carnival Tour event. He compiled footage for the mixtape using the Prelinger Archives, as well as various online sources, and applied visual effects to them "until you didn't quite know what you were looking at." He originally imagined for it to exist as a "bizarre collection" of Internet and archival footage intertwined with clips from Adult Swim shows, "set to good music." He ultimately had to omit the latter material, however, as the network would still have to acquire licenses for their own series in derivative works. He found that once they were gone, "the show really opened up."

Variant of the poster for branding

In putting an episode together, Hughes seeks clips "with some kind of truth or integrity to them", opting for both viral videos in addition to ones with fewer view counts. (Note: Original pieces are also commissioned.) Tracking down licensees for clips proves to be the most difficult aspect of the process, he stated, with co-producers Cody DeMatteis and Alan Steadman assisting him in pursuit of material hard to obtain. (Note: Before Hughes explained his process, Colin Foord of the Miami-based art collective Coral Morphologic, whose short film Oyster Vision is featured in the second episode, said he was unsure how producers sought after his film. He posited that they found it through their Vimeo account or their exposure at the Borscht Film Festival.) When asked if getting consent for other's work posed a challenge, Hughes noted it to be helpful working under the "Adult Swim banner", with only a few artists responding with reluctance. He wrote that each piece of the episode is treated with protection, not "trying to exploit anyone or make fun of anything or anybody."

Each episode is edited using Final Cut Pro, along with Adobe Photoshop and Adobe After Effects for further manipulation (often employing datamoshing techniques). Hughes observed a large portion of producing episodes to stem from "finding the right music to go with the visuals, or vice versa", and found transitions to "really help keep it moving." Likewise, Hughes digressed from Liquid Television's use of longer segments in order to make the series a "larger event rather than a series of smaller events", and found visual effects and transitions to be "a huge part" of his theory in making an episode.

Starting in Season 7, the series began airing episodes produced by guest curators.

A compilation of videos that were once considered to be featured in the first season had been published on the network's official blog. (Note: These compilations were removed following a redesign of the network's website.) These videos, extending into its second season as well as hosting various other supplemental material, have since been published onto Network Awesome. A compilation of material from the first season and additional shorts was given a theatrical release at Cinefamily on August 25, 2012, which Hughes attended.

In 2018, Hughes started Smalls, a complementary series on Adult Swim's website featuring original shorts from the artists featured on Off the Air as well as new talent. Hughes has said he intended for the series to include "more traditional shorts, [with] a little more character and a little more comedy," as opposed to the more abstract material on Off the Air. The series includes both weekly online short films and full 11-minute shorts for the network proper, the latter of which air under the title Adult Swim Smalls Presents. The shorts and TV episodes also air on the Off the Air marathon stream on the network's website. Beginning in 2022, episodes of Smalls were added to HBO Max, with some also premiering there.

== Broadcast and reception ==
Its first episode, "Animals", premiered on Adult Swim on New Year's Day 2011 at 4 a.m.; it was broadcast twice in a row, back-to-back. Episodes have continued to air in this time slot—considered a graveyard slot in broadcast programming—and as a result of this and its small selection of episodes, the series remains relatively unknown on the network. However, Austin McManus of Juxtapoz noted word of mouth to be "gradually spreading" about it. He and the network also described the show as a cult phenomenon. Three specials have been produced: "Dan Deacon: U.S.A.", broadcast July 6, 2013, consists of surreal footage of American landscapes, with music from the last four tracks of the album America by Dan Deacon. A second special—the second-season episode "Nightmares" played in literal reverse—aired after Halloween night on November 1, 2014. The third special is a music video of Deacon's song "When I Was Done Dying" from his album Gliss Riffer animated by nine directors featured previously in Off the Air, that broadcast March 24, 2015.

It has received positive critical reception, with McManus conducting an eight-page interview and profile of Hughes in appreciation of the series. The magazine had previously published a special issue centered on the network and its shows in July 2012, but overlooked Off the Air, presenting an "opportunity to shed a little insight and background on an extraordinary unique show." Speaking from the first time he watched it, McManus praised it for not being "your typical try-too-hard-to-be-weird production." In Adweek, Sam Thielman ranked it second place out of 18 other programs on the network. He tied it with the network's parody Infomercials and wrote that it was "in the same category as King Star King among things that are so cool and strange that they look like they should probably be part of a video installation in an art gallery somewhere."

For Neon Tommy, Jeremy Fuster called it "a dark, unspeakable corner of television where no light can reach and only the sleepless and drug-addled dare to venture." Amanda McCorquodale of the Miami New Times joked that, for artists featured on the show, "nothing compares to the prestige of sharing a network with Tim & Eric and Brak, right?" Ultimately, she saw it as the "already bizarre network's foray into out-there visual experimentation." Writing for The Fader, Matthew Trammell regarded it as "when things get really interesting." PQ Ribber of The Overnightscape Underground dubbed the series a "modern version" of Liquid Television and called it "really kinda spiffy, and trippy, and cool." Casper Kelly sought inspiration from the show during the production of his short film for the network, Too Many Cooks.

Ratings-wise, several episodes have surpassed one million views according to Nielsen Media Research. Hughes added that he follows the series' ratings when it occurs to him, but does not receive further analytics. He found it to trend on Twitter during the weeks of its airing, and likes viewing user's statuses regarding it. In particular, he enjoys reactions from people who wake up to it after falling asleep to the network, and judged from the online response that its audience would be "pretty young, late teens, early 20s" and "strangely positive and engaged." The network has broadcast praise of the show written by viewers in the form of bumpers, often hinting at further episodes being produced. Episodes have been distributed to sites like YouTube, while a continuous online stream of the show was launched by the network on September 5, 2014. On December 19, 2014, the show's Facebook page announced that additional exclusive material will be added to the livestream.
