= When I Was Done Dying =

- Promotional CD cover

Song by Dan Deacon

from the album Gliss Riffer
- Released: February 24, 2015
- Length: 4:18
- Songwriter: Dan Deacon
- Producer: Dan Deacon

Music video
- DDWIWDD (Dan Deacon “When I Was Done Dying”) on YouTube

"When I Was Done Dying" is a song by American composer and electronic musician Dan Deacon, which appeared as the third track on his fourth studio album, Gliss Riffer (2015).

== Background and lyrics ==
Having experienced a bout of laryngitis, Deacon began to focus more on his voice when producing Gliss Riffer. He came to like the idea that his body, memory and consciousness are three separate things that are "constantly oscillating" without control, and this led to what he described as "psychedelic rambling" featured in the song. Deacon wrote the song's stream-of-consciousness lyrics on a train returning from New York, inspired by the works of Joanna Newsom and Bob Dylan, as well as their approach of using minimal instrumentation to allow the lyrics to "go wild" and evoke imaginative surrealism.

Merry Go Round Magazine described "When I Was Done Dying" as a "mammoth musical piece" and a "cathartic, existential roller coaster" featuring electric guitars, synthesizers, "propulsive" tribal drums and "waterfalls" of marimbas. In a 2025 interview with Deacon, Ayaan Paul Chowdhury of The Hindu described the song as a "surreal meditation on death, rebirth, and everything in between" and as Deacon's breakout hit. In an article for Consequence, Michelle Geslani called the song "trippy" and "aqueous". Max Savage Levenson of KQED wrote that the song is "sung in a clear voice" and "marks a distinct shift in Deacon’s approach to songwriting".

== Music video ==
The music video was released on March 24, 2015, as a special feature of the psychedelic anthology television series Off the Air, which aired on the Adult Swim programming block. Directed by series creator Dave Hughes, the video was produced in an exquisite corpse format involving nine creators: Jake Fried, Chad VanGaalen, Caleb Wood, Hiraoka Masanobu, Colin White, Dmitri Stankowicz, Anthony Francisco Schepperd, Kokofreakbean and Taras Hrabowsky. The song's lyrics about a "body drifting into different vessels" and a "consciousness [losing] consciousness and becoming a new consciousness" led Deacon to approach Hughes, advising him to structure the video as a sequence of works by several visual artists. VanGaalen's segment was inspired by The Incal, a graphic novel written by Alejandro Jodorowsky and illustrated by Jean Giraud, in creating a "quasi future/retro world of creatures and technology".

The video was described by The Absolute Mag as a "surreal journey through the afterlife". Vice compared the video to "stepping into a whirlpool of imaginary 2D and 3D worlds". The video has been viewed over ten million times on YouTube.
