= Dave Hughes (producer) =

American television producer and editor

- Born: David Hughes; 1970 or 1971 (age 54–55)
- Occupations: Television producer, editor
- Years active: 1995–present
- Known for: Off the Air

Dave Hughes is an American television producer and editor, currently employed at Williams Street as well the founder of his production studio, Million Monkeys Inc. Hughes previously worked as a video editor while at MTV Animation, working on series such as Beavis and Butt-head, Celebrity Deathmatch and Cartoon Sushi, before meeting with coworker Matt Harrigan to work on Space Ghost Coast to Coast in Los Angeles. He has worked on several Adult Swim series, and is the creator of his own show for the network, Off the Air.

== Early life ==
Hughes had been interested in animation in general as a child, experimenting with computers, stop motion and videography. In high school, he and several friends signed up for television production course, where he found "that it could maybe be more than a hobby." Afterwards, he attended Ithaca College to study television and radio. There, he produced a local TV show and a radio program around 1991, which was broadcast throughout the city and the source of a sponsorship between a local pizzeria.

After graduating college, Hughes moved into New York City. Elaborating on his inspirations, 120 Minutes, Concrete TV, Liquid Television, and Night Flight were among some of the experimental programming in the city from the late 1980s and early '90s to expose him "to a whole new world of ideas, music and people that I just didn't see anywhere else on television."

== Career ==
Hughes' first job in television was at MTV Animation, where he worked from 1995 until it folded in 2003. He described his break into the industry as "a genuine lucky, fluky" one; initially temping on the oil and future trading floor at 399 Park Avenue, he declined a job offer given to him at the building. He cited that, while paying a good salary, the work was "very bizarre" and out of his knowledge base.

A week after declining, he heard a recorded message from production members of Beavis and Butt-head regarding his roommate, Nate, from whom he was subletting at his apartment. Nate, on a concert tour at the time of the call, had sent his resume to the staff "on a whim" before he left. Hughes felt "there was no way I wasn't returning that call", and later, he was interviewed and got the job. Before his interview, Hughes explained that he felt honest about himself and confidence his qualifications, which entailed "running tapes around town". After being hired, Hughes worked on series such as Beavis and Butt-Head, Celebrity Deathmatch and Cartoon Sushi. For his work for Celebrity Deathmatch, Hughes was quoted on how his coworkers had to assemble a weekly series in the five months between its appearance in Cartoon Sushi and premiere in May 1998. Hughes is credited as a special effects artist for its feature film, Beavis and Butt-head Do America, acting as assistant editor for the film's hallucination sequence directed by Chris Prynoski.

After the studio folded, Hughes started working for Nickelodeon, creating station IDs and brand elements for the network's spinoff channel, Nicktoons. Finding the job "not a good fit", he got a call from coworker Matt Harrigan to work on the eighth season of Space Ghost Coast to Coast for Adult Swim in Los Angeles. He promptly accepted the offer, jumping "at the chance to get out of Nickelodeon". Hughes spent the following year working as an offline editor within an abandoned AOL office in Santa Monica, California. Hughes called it "a revelation", observing that, while editing animation at MTV "was kind of an afterthought", reserved for timing and minor tweaks in animation, the editor at Adult Swim was "absolutely essential to the process." In 2005, Hughes founded his own video production studio, Million Monkeys Inc. He has worked on various series and station IDs for the network, among other projects.

Hughes was credited by Christy Karacas and Stephen Warbrick, creators of the Adult Swim series Superjail!, for sharing their animated short Bar Fight which he had edited with the network, which garnered their interest for a full series. Hughes would serve as a story consultant during the first season of the series. Hughes worked with Dan Deacon in 2008 to produce a music video for "Okie Dokie" out of his album Spiderman of the Rings. He later created his own series, Off the Air, which premiered on the network, unannounced, on New Year's Day 2011 at 4 a.m. (Note: As of December 2023, thirteen seasons, totaling 50 episodes and 3 specials, have aired.) He took inspiration from the experimental programming he watched while in New York City. He stated that, while he had envisioned the series before, he never realized "it would be me who did it." Hughes stated that he incorporates clips "with some kind of truth or integrity to them", and that viral videos as well as obscure content are put into episodes.

Hughes again collaborated with Deacon to create a special for Off the Air entitled "Dan Deacon: U.S.A.". He also served as producer for the television special Live Forever as You Are Now with Alan Resnick, which premiered on the network in December 2013. For the 2014 San Diego Comic-Con, he was the creator of an animated short presented in a planetarium-like structure, entitled the Meatwad Full Dome Experience.
