= Dustin Wong =

American guitarist

Dustin Wong is an American guitarist formerly active in the art-rock band Ponytail and a former member of the experimental guitar duo Ecstatic Sunshine (along with Matthew Papich).

== Biography ==
Wong's style is characterized by influences of surf rock and John Fahey. Wong was born in Hawaii and grew up in Japan, though he is half Chinese. Together with Matt Papich he formed the duo Ecstatic Sunshine and released two albums. Wong left Ecstatic Sunshine in 2007 to fully focus on Ponytail and solo projects. Wong's first solo record in 2009 on Wildfire Wildfire was entitled Seasons. Wong published a second solo-album Infinite Love in October 2010. A 40-minute piece cut into 15 tracks and then re-done on a 2nd CD. This instrumental release appeared on Thrill Jockey. After releasing the record he went on tour in Europe. Although Dustin Wong had announced that Whartscape 2010 in Baltimore, Maryland would be the last Ponytail show, a new album was announced. The band released their third full-length album, titled Do Whatever You Want All The Time, in April 2011. However Ponytail broke up on September 22. 2011. Wong moved to New York and continued as a solo artist and published his third record in February 2012. Dustin contributed to Flamingods' debut album Sun, providing guitar backing for the album's lead single 'Quesso'. He relocated to Tokyo in 2012, and began collaborating with Takako Minekawa. They have recorded the albums Toropical Circle (2013), Savage Imagination (2014), and Are Euphoria (2017). Wong co-wrote and plays guitar on "Bumble Bee Crown King," the final track on Dan Deacon's 2020 album Mystic Familiar.

== Technical setup ==
During Wong’s live performances, he creates intricate pieces based on cyclical guitar loops. His live setup is built around a loop pedal, combined with octave and distortion pedals to change the textures and colors of the guitar, plus a delay pedal to determine the tempo and pattern. He manipulates the pedal controls while performing.

In Jan 2014, he described his guitar rig as a Japanese-made Fender Telecaster from the ’80s fed through a pedal chain that includes: a Boss TU-2 tuner, followed by a Foxrox Octron, Boss DS-1 Distortion modified to have a wider frequency range, ISP Decimator noise gate, a Boss DD-3 Digital Delay, followed by a Boss RC-2 Loop Station, then a Digitech Synth Wah, and another DD-3. The output goes through a DI box directly into the P.A. He also uses a 1980s-era Kawai R-50e drum machine run into the looping pedal.

== Discography ==
=== Solo releases ===
List of solo releases by Dustin Wong
Name	Release date	Format	Label
Seasons	June 2009	LP	Wildfire Wildfire
Let It Go	April 2010	Cassette	WTRCLR
Infinite Love	October 2010		Thrill Jockey
Split 12" w/ Gentle Friendly	November 2011		Palmist Records
Dreams Say, View, Create, Shadow Leads	February 2012		Thrill Jockey
Mediation of Ecstatic Energy	2013		Thrill Jockey

=== Records released with Ecstatic Sunshine ===
==== Albums ====
- New Kind of Imagination, 2004
- Freckle Wars, 2006, Carpark Records
- Way, May 14, 2008, Cardboard Records, Grayson Currin

==== EPs ====
- Living, 2007, Non EMI

=== Records released with Takako Minekawa ===
- Toropical Circle, 2013 (Plancha / Thrill Jockey)
- Savage Imagination, 2014 (Thrill Jockey / Plancha)
- Are Euphoria EP, 2017 (Thrill Jockey)
