= Minted (film) =

- Poster
- Directed by: Nicholas Bruckman
- Written by: Shawn Hazelett; Nicholas Bruckman
- Produced by: Rahilla Zafar; Shawn Hazelett; Nicholas Bruckman
- Cinematography: Erin Collett
- Edited by: Gil Seltzer
- Music by: Dan Deacon
- Production companies: People's Television; Sequence Creative
- Release date: 2023

Minted is an American documentary film directed, co-written, and produced by Nicholas Bruckman that examines the non-fungible token (NFT) digital art market, its $40 billion valuation peak in 2021, and its crash in 2022. The film follows artists, collectors, and critics to explore the NFT phenomenon. It premiered at the 2023 Tribeca Film Festival and was broadcast on PBS's Independent Lens on January 6, 2025, and had its streaming rights acquired by Netflix for select regions, including North America, the UK, Africa, and Australia/New Zealand, debuting on April 9, 2025.

== Synopsis ==
The film explores the $40 billion NFT market, starting with Beeple’s $69 million sale of Everydays: The First 5000 Days at Christie’s. It follows artists like Beeple, Latasha Alcindor, and Nigerian twins Taslemat and Taesirat Yusuf, showing how NFTs enabled artists to bypass traditional art markets. The film also addresses NFT controversies, including speculative concerns, with critics like Andrew Chow and James Grimmelman. It covers the market’s 2021 boom and 2022-2023 crash, examining art, technology, and commerce.

== Cast ==
- Mike Winkelmann as Himself
- Justin Aversano as Himself
- James Grimmelman as Himself
- Latasha Alcindor as Herself
- Laura Shin as Herself
- Zachary Small as Himself

== Production ==
The film was directed by Nicholas Bruckman, co-written by Bruckman and Shawn Hazelett, and produced by Bruckman, Hazelett, and Rahilla Zafar, with Zafar also serving as executive producer. The film is a production of People’s Television, Inc., Bruckman’s New York and D.C.-based studio. The score was composed by Dan Deacon. The film was supported by global sales agency CAT&Docs, with distribution negotiated by Range Media Partners.

== Release ==
The film premiered at the 2023 Tribeca Film Festival in the Spotlight Documentary section and had an international premiere at CPH:DOX in Copenhagen. It aired on PBS’s Independent Lens on January 6, 2025. Netflix acquired streaming rights, debuting the film on April 9, 2025, in North America, the UK, Africa, and Australia/New Zealand. The film was screened at festivals like the Sarasota Film Festival.

== Reception ==
On review aggregator Rotten Tomatoes, the film holds an approval rating of 83% based on 12 reviews. The Wall Street Journal called it a captivating introduction to NFTs for newcomers, praising its clear explanations of blockchain and engaging artist profiles, but noted that its 80-minute runtime feels rushed, attempting to cover too much of the market’s complexities and controversies.

== Accolades ==
Year	Award	Category	Recipient(s)	Result	Ref.
2024	Cleveland International Film Festival	Ad Hoc Docs Competition	Nicholas Bruckman	Nominated	
