= Not Going Quietly =

- Promotional release poster
- Directed by: Nicholas Bruckman
- Written by: Nicholas Bruckman; Amanda Roddy
- Produced by: Amanda Roddy
- Cinematography: Alex Pollini; Ryder Haske; Amanda Roddy; Michael Dwyer; Erin Collett; Nicholas Bruckman
- Edited by: Kent Basset
- Music by: Giosuè Greco
- Production companies: Duplass Brothers Productions; People's Television
- Distributed by: Greenwich Entertainment
- Release dates: March 17, 2021 (SXSW); August 13, 2021 (United States)
- Running time: 96 minutes
- Country: United States
- Language: English

Not Going Quietly is a 2021 American documentary film, directed by Nicholas Bruckman and produced by Amanda Roddy, following Ady Barkan, embarking on a national campaign for healthcare reform. Mark Duplass, Jay Duplass and Bradley Whitford serve as executive producers.

It had its world premiere at South by Southwest on March 17, 2021, where it won the Special Jury Award for Humanity in Social Action and the Audience Award in the Documentary Feature Competition. It was released on August 13, 2021, by Greenwich Entertainment.

== Synopsis ==
After being diagnosed with ALS, Ady Barkan embarks on a national campaign for healthcare reform. Barkan, Rachael King, Elizabeth Jaff, Ana Maria Archila, Nate Smith and Tracey Corder appear in the film.

== Production ==
The film was directed by Nicholas Bruckman, who co-wrote the film with producer Amanda Roddy. Kent Bassett served as editor. Executive producers included Mark Duplass, Jay Duplass, and Bradley Whitford. Produced by People's Television and Duplass Brothers Productions, it received fiscal sponsorship from Film Independent. Filming centered on Ady Barkan's 2018 midterm activism, capturing his advocacy and ALS challenges, including declining speech.

== Release ==
It had its world premiere at South by Southwest on March 17, 2021. It was scheduled to have its world premiere at the Tribeca Film Festival on April 15, 2020. However, it was cancelled due to the COVID-19 pandemic. It was theatrically released in the United States by Greenwich Entertainment on August 13, 2021. Internationally, the film was distributed by Vice Media. In June 2021, PBS acquired broadcast rights, airing the film as part of the POV series on January 24, 2022. It became available for streaming on platforms including Hulu.

== Reception ==
On the review aggregator website Rotten Tomatoes, 100% of 24 critics' reviews are positive, with an average rating of 8.1/10. The website's consensus reads: "Not Going Quietly uses its subject's remarkable story to offer an uplifting tribute to the way an individual voice can lead to activism and collective change." Metacritic, which uses a weighted average, assigned the film a score of 73 out of 100, based on nine critics, indicating "generally favorable" reviews.

Nick Allen of RogerEbert.com called the film "A pure shot of inspiration." John DeFore of The Hollywood Reporter called it "A stirring tale of activism." Tomris Laffly of Variety wrote: "An emotionally stirring, politically rousing doc."

== Accolades ==
Year	Award	Category	Recipient(s)	Result	Ref.
2021	South by Southwest	Audience Award	Nicholas Bruckman	Won	
2021	South by Southwest	Special Jury Award	Nicholas Bruckman	Won	
2021	Cleveland International Film Festival	Roxanne T. Mueller Audience Choice Award	Nicholas Bruckman	Won	
2021	ALMA Award	Best Jewish Documentary	Nicholas Bruckman	Won	
2021	Critics' Choice Documentary Awards	Most Compelling Living Subject of a Documentary	Ady Barkan	Won	
2022	Cinema Eye Honors	The Unforgettables	Ady Barkan	Won	
2022	International Documentary Association	Best Feature	Nicholas Bruckman	Nominated	
2022	International Documentary Association	Best Writing	Nicholas Bruckman	Nominated	
2022	International Documentary Association	Best Director	Nicholas Bruckman	Nominated	
2022	Social Impact Media Awards	Lens to Action	Nicholas Bruckman	Won	
2022	Cinema for Peace awards	Political Film of the Year	Nicholas Bruckman	Won	
2023	News and Documentary Emmy Awards	Outstanding Writing: Documentary	Nicholas Bruckman, Amanda Roddy and	Nominated	
2023	News and Documentary Emmy Awards	Outstanding Politics and Government Documentary	Nicholas Bruckman and Amanda Roddy	Nominated	
