= Nicholas Bruckman =

American documentary director, producer, writer editor and cinematographer

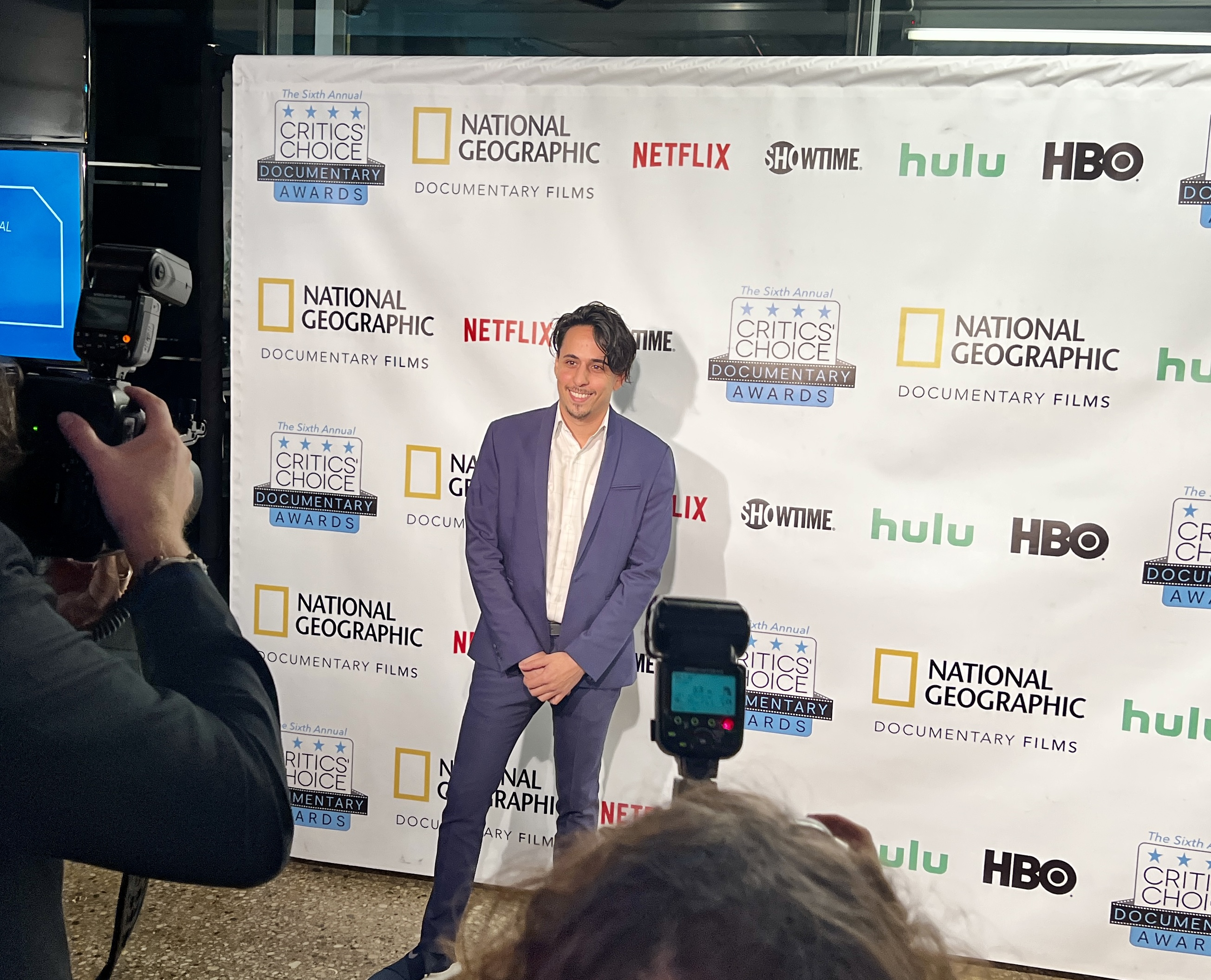
- Born: London, England
- Occupations: Director; producer; writer
- Years active: 2008 – present

Nicholas Bruckman is an American documentary filmmaker. He is best known for his work on the documentaries La Americana, Not Going Quietly and Minted.

== Life and career ==
Bruckman was born in London. He graduated from SUNY Purchase. He is the founder of People's Television, an independent film and commercial production company.

In 2008, Bruckman directed his debut feature documentary, La Americana, which aired worldwide on networks including National Geographic and Al Jazeera. In 2012, he produced the feature film, Valley of Saints, which won the Audience Award at the Sundance Film Festival. In 2021, he directed the documentary film, Not Going Quietly, which premiered at South by Southwest where it won the Audience Award and Special Jury Award.

In 2023, Bruckman directed, co-wrote, and produced Minted, a documentary exploring the rise and fall of the NFT art market. It premiered at the 2023 Tribeca Film Festival, was broadcast on PBS’s Independent Lens on January 6, 2025, and debuted on Netflix in select regions on April 9, 2025. In 2025, he co-directed the docuseries The Price of Milk with Yoni Brook, a four-part series exploring the 1990s "Got Milk?" campaign’s impact on dairy farmers, the Dairy Checkoff program, and America’s relationship with milk, premiering at the 2025 Tribeca Film Festival.

== Filmography ==
| Year | Title | Contribution | Note |
|---|---|---|---|
| 2008 | La Americana | Director, editor, cinematographer and producer | Documentary |
| 2008 | Bronx Princess | post-production producer | Short film |
| 2009 | POV | post-production producer | TV series |
| 2010 | The New Recruits | Field producer | |
| 2012 | Valley of Saints | Producer | Feature film |
| 2012 | #ImHere - THE CALL | Producer | Short film |
| 2012 | Crazy Love | Associate producer | Short film |
| 2015 | How We Do It | Director and producer | Short film |
| 2020 | Desert Mourning | Executive producer | Short film |
| 2020 | Rosa | Executive producer | Short film |
| 2021 | Not Going Quietly | Director, writer and executive producer | Documentary |
| 2023 | Minted | Director, writer | Documentary |
| 2025 | The Price of Milk | Director, producer | Documentary |

== Awards and nominations ==
| Year | Result | Award | Category | Work | Ref. |
|---|---|---|---|---|---|
| 2008 | Won | New York International Latino Film Festival | Best Documentary Film | La Americana | |
| 2012 | Won | Dubai International Film Festival | Special Jury Prize | Valley of Saints | |
| 2021 | Won | South by Southwest | Audience Award | Not Going Quietly | |
| 2021 | Won | South by Southwest | Special Jury Award | Not Going Quietly | |
| 2021 | Won | Cleveland International Film Festival | Roxanne T. Mueller Audience Choice Award | Not Going Quietly | |
| 2022 | Nominated | International Documentary Association | Best Feature | Not Going Quietly | |
| 2022 | Nominated | International Documentary Association | Best Director | Not Going Quietly | |
| 2022 | Nominated | International Documentary Association | Best Writing | Not Going Quietly | |
| 2023 | Nominated | News and Documentary Emmy Awards | Outstanding Politics and Government Documentary | Not Going Quietly | |
| 2023 | Nominated | News and Documentary Emmy Awards | Outstanding Writing: Documentary | Not Going Quietly | |
| 2024 | Nominated | Cleveland International Film Festival | Ad Hoc Docs Competition | Minted | |
