= Gliss Riffer =

Studio album by Dan Deacon
- Released: February 24, 2015
- Genre: Indietronica
- Length: 43:48
- Label: Domino Records
- Producer: Dan Deacon

Dan Deacon chronology
America (2012)	Gliss Riffer (2015)	Mystic Familiar (2020)

Singles from Glass Riffer
- 1. "Feel the Lightning" Released: December 11, 2014; 2. "Learning to Relax" Released: February 11, 2015

Gliss Riffer is the fourth studio album by American electronic musician Dan Deacon. It was released on February 24, 2015, on Domino Records.

== Background ==
The album's title is combination of the common music term "Gliss", short for glissando, and riffer, "one who plays sick riffs". In an interview with NPR, Deacon said: "It's something that auto-correct wants to make sure that no one can actually type: I've seen 'Glass Rafter,' 'Gloss Dripper.' But I kind of like the idea of the Internet trying to change the name of my record. I feel like it really speaks to the age we live in, where there's such a homogeny of technology that you try to write something down, it instantly changes and no one even notices."

While previous efforts Bromst and America utilized outside production from Chester Endersby Gwazda, Gliss Riffer marks Deacon's first production process entirely solo. In an interview with Dummy Mag, Deacon states, "I love working with others, but ultimately I'm a solo artist. After several albums and projects that had large collaborative elements, I wanted to return to making something alone with the instruments I knew best."

=== Themes ===
In an interview with Consequence of Sound about the album, Deacon says, "Lyrically and musically, it's me trying to relax. I wanted to make Gliss Riffer about me trying to confront my own anxieties or insecurities and the stresses in my life. In saying that, I also wanted the record to be fun. I wanted to figure out why music making is fun for me."

== Recording ==
Deacon recorded the album while on tour with Arcade Fire in 2014. Deacon created the album in green rooms and hotels, and on days off used studios to track vocals or mix. Deacon states, "When a studio couldn't be found, I dismantled a hotel bathroom, sealing the vents with towels and using all the bedding to turn it into a control room."

While creating the album, Deacon discovered a newfound appreciation for his voice after going through an extended bout of laryngitis. Deacon states, "I started thinking about how the voice is an instrument that expires, and that made me want to make an album with the voice more exposed."

The album marks the debut use of Moog's analog synth, the Sub 37.

== Reception ==
Professional ratings
Aggregate scores
Source	Rating
AnyDecentMusic?	7.4/10
Metacritic	77/100
Review scores
Source	Rating
AllMusic	4/5 stars
The A.V. Club	B
Consequence of Sound	A-
The Guardian	4/5 stars
Pitchfork	7.2/10
Rolling Stone	3/5 stars

The album has received a number of accolades. Consequence of Sound, Under the Radar, and Gigwise named Gliss Riffer the 15th, 41st, and 53rd best album of 2015, respectively.

== Track listing ==
No.	Title	Length
1.	"Feel the Lightning"	4:53
2.	"Sheathed Wings"	4:08
3.	"When I Was Done Dying"	4:18
4.	"Meme Generator"	4:31
5.	"Mind on Fire"	3:51
6.	"Learning to Relax"	6:44
7.	"Take It to the Max"	7:48
8.	"Steely Blues"	7:35

== Personnel ==
Musicians

- Andrew Bernstein - saxophone
- Dan Deacon - arranger, composer, engineering, mixing, production, vocals
- Patrick McMinn - assistant engineering, guitar
- Kevin O'Meara - drums

Production

- Rob Carmichael - design
- Joanna Fields - illustrations
- Mike Marsh - mastering
- Albert Schatz - assistant engineering

== See also ==
- Music of Baltimore
