= Cusp (film) =

- Promotional release poster
- Directed by: Isabel Bethencourt; Parker Hill
- Music by: T. Griffin
- Country of origin: United States
- Original language: English

Production
- Producers: Isabel Bethencourt; Parker Hill; Zachary Luke Kislevitz
- Cinematography: Isabel Bethencourt; Parker Hill
- Editor: Parker Hill
- Running time: 92 minutes
- Production companies: Kislevtiz Films; Maiden Voyage Pictures; Wavelength Productions; The 51 Fund

Original release
- Network: Showtime
- Release: November 26, 2021

Cusp is a 2021 American documentary film directed and produced by Isabel Bethencourt and Parker Hill. It follows three teenage girls at the end of summer.

The film premiered at the 2021 Sundance Film Festival, and was released on Showtime on November 26, 2021.

== Synopsis ==
Three teenage girls in Texas confront the dark corners of adolescence at the end of summer.

== Release ==
The film had its world premiere at the Sundance Film Festival on January 30, 2021. In April 2021, Showtime Documentary Films acquired distribution rights to the film. It was released on Showtime on November 26, 2021.

== Reception ==
Cusp received positive reviews from film critics. It holds a 90% approval rating on review aggregator website Rotten Tomatoes, based on 21 reviews, with a weighted average of 6.90/10. The site's critical consensus reads, "Cusp smartly and sensitively captures the experiences of a trio of teen girls as they navigate the uncertain ground between youth and adulthood."
