= Fire in the Mountains =

Indian drama film

- Directed by: Ajitpal Singh
- Written by: Ajitpal Singh
- Produced by: Alan McAlex; Ajay Rai
- Starring: Vinamrata Rai; Chandan Bisht; Harshita Tiwari; Mayank Singh Jaira
- Cinematography: Dominique Colin
- Edited by: Parikshhit Jha; Simon Price
- Music by: Arnaud van Vliet
- Production company: Jar Pictures
- Release date: 31 January 2021 (Sundance)
- Running time: 84 minutes
- Country: India
- Language: Hindi
- Box office: $12,038

Fire in the Mountains is an Indian drama film directed and written by Ajitpal Singh in his directorial debut. The film stars Vinamrata Rai, Chandan Bisht, Harshita Tiwari and Mayank Singh Jaira.

The film had its world premiere at the 2021 Sundance Film Festival on 31 January 2021.

== Cast ==
The cast includes:

- Vinamrata Rai as Chandra
- Chandan Bisht as Dharam
- Harshita Tiwari as Kanchan
- Mayank Singh Jaira as Prakash
- Sunil Tewari as Various Characters

== Release ==
The film has its world premiere at the 2021 Sundance Film Festival on 31 January 2021 in the World Cinema Dramatic Competition section.

== Reception ==
On the review aggregator website Rotten Tomatoes, 100% of 8 critics' reviews are positive, with an average rating of 6.7/10.
