= Bromst =

Studio album by Dan Deacon
- Released: March 24, 2009
- Genre: Indietronica, noise pop
- Length: 64:20
- Label: Carpark Records (Atlantic/ADA)

Dan Deacon chronology
Spiderman of the Rings (2007)	Bromst (2009)	America (2012)

Bromst is the second studio album by the American electronic musician Dan Deacon. It was released on March 24, 2009.

== Background ==
According to Deacon: "Spiderman of the Rings was very carefree and youthful – sort of partying for the sake of partying. This record is less about a party and more about a celebration." In an interview broadcast on NPR's Talk of the Nation on April 22, 2009, Deacon stated that the word "Bromst" had no meaning other than being the title of the album.

In an interview with The A.V. Club, Deacon discusses the composition and lyrical content of the album: "The music itself is very much about cycles, time, and what happens after life, becoming a ghost and stuff like that… The lyrical content is about the future. I think there is going to be a large paradigm shift in a few years, and it could either be to a new age of enlightenment and unity... or it could be a return to a dark age of kings and mass, open oppression followed by a die-off of human culture."

=== Recording process ===
While many of the sounds in Bromst are computer generated, much of it was recorded using live instruments. The album was produced by Chester Gwazda and tracked mainly in Baltimore and was mixed at SnowGhost Studio in Whitefish, Montana.

For a few of the tracks on Bromst, Deacon uses a player piano. The piano had to be re-wired so that each line was tracked individually, so the piano could keep up with what Deacon composed, which engineer Brett Allen claims to be impossibly fast to play on one piano.

== Live ==
On December 11, 2008, Deacon performed many of the songs from Bromst with an ensemble of live performers at the Masonic Temple in Brooklyn, New York. The lineup of the ensemble was:

Percussion:

- Eric Beach (So Percussion)
- Denny Bowen (Double Dagger, Roomrunner, Smart Growth)
- Jeremy Hyman (Ponytail, Ultimate Reality)
- Kevin O'Meara (Videohippos, Ultimate Reality)
- Rich O'Meara (ko'mm)
- Josh Quillen (So Percussion)
- Adam Sliwinski (So Percussion)
- Jason Treuting (So Percussion)
- Max Eilbacher (Needle Gun, Teeth Mountain)

Synthesizers, keyboards, and electronics:

- Benny Boeldt (Adventure)
- William Cashion (Future Islands)
- Dan Deacon
- Chester Gwazda (Nuclear Power Pants)
- Gerrit Welmers (Future Islands)

Guitars:

- Matt Papiach (Ecstatic Sunshine, White Williams)
- Ken Seeno (Ponytail)

Deacon embarked on a North American tour in the spring of 2009 where he performed with a 14-piece band, similar to the one above.

== Reception ==
Professional ratings
Aggregate scores
Source	Rating
AnyDecentMusic?	7.6/10
Metacritic	77/100
Review scores
Source	Rating
AllMusic	4/5 stars
Alternative Press	4.5/5 stars
The A.V. Club	A
Blender	3.5/5 stars
Mojo	4/5 stars
Pitchfork	8.5/10
Q	3/5 stars
Tiny Mix Tapes	4/5 stars
Uncut	3/5 stars
Under the Radar	8/10

According to the review aggregator Metacritic, Bromst received "generally favorable reviews" based on a weighted average score of 77 out of 100 from 25 critic scores.

Nitsuh Abebe of Pitchfork praised the album, awarding it with Best New Music. Comparing the album to Deacon’s Spiderman of the Rings, Abebe writes of Bromst: "The palette is richer, the samples smoother, the space larger, the programming slightly less buzzy."

== Track listing ==
No.	Title	Length
1.	"Build Voice"	5:28
2.	"Red F"	4:38
3.	"Paddling Ghost"	4:05
4.	"Snookered"	8:04
5.	"Of the Mountains"	7:16
6.	"Surprise Stefani"	7:46
7.	"Wet Wings"	2:53
8.	"Woof Woof"	4:44
9.	"Slow With Horns / Run for Your Life"	6:35
10.	"Baltihorse"	6:21
11.	"Get Older"	6:30
Total length:		64:20

iTunes Store bonus track
No.	Title	Length
12.	"Kalimidiba"	2:40
Total length:		67:00

== Personnel ==
- Dan Deacon – electronics, vocals, trombone, drums
- Chester Gwazda – Keyboards
- Kevin O'Meara – Mallets, Drums
- Rich O'Meara – Mallets
- Jeremy Hyman – Drums
- Andy Abelow – Alto Saxophone
- Connor Kizer – Trumpet
- Matt Papiach – Guitar
- Jana Hunter – Vocals on "Wet Wings"
