= The Pink Cloud =

2021 film by Iuli Gerbase

- Theatrical release poster
- Portuguese: A Nuvem Rosa
- Directed by: Iuli Gerbase
- Written by: Iuli Gerbase
- Produced by: Patricia Barbieri
- Starring: Renata de Lélis; Eduardo Mendonça
- Cinematography: Bruno Polidoro
- Edited by: Vicente Moreno
- Music by: Caio Amon
- Production company: Prana Filmes
- Distributed by: O2 Play
- Release dates: 29 January 2021 (Sundance); 26 August 2021 (Brazil)
- Running time: 105 minutes
- Country: Brazil
- Language: Portuguese
- Box office: $23,733

The Pink Cloud (Portuguese: A Nuvem Rosa) is a 2021 Brazilian science fiction thriller film written and directed by Iuli Gerbase in her directional debut. The setting of the story in the film has been compared to the COVID-19 pandemic, although written and directed earlier, in 2017 and 2019 respectively. The film stars Renata de Lélis, Eduardo Mendonça, Kaya Rodrigues, Helena Becker and Girley Paes.

The film had its world premiere at the Sundance Film Festival on 29 January 2021. It was released theatrically in Brazil on 26 August 2021 by O2 Play.

== Cast ==
The cast include:

- Renata de Lélis as Giovana
- Eduardo Mendonça as Yago
- Kaya Rodrigues as Sara
- Helena Becker as Júlia
- Girley Paes as Rui

== Plot ==
Giovana and Yago meet and have a one-night stand. The next morning a shelter-in-place order occurs when a mysterious and deadly pink cloud appears. They are forced to shelter together.

When the lockdown first begins, they communicate with family and friends via phone and video chat. Giovana tells her mother on the phone that she met Yago yesterday. Giovana’s friend is trapped at home alone because her partner went to the bakery. Yago’s father, who may have dementia or another illness, is isolated with his nurse. Giovana’s kid sister is isolated at a sleepover with a friend’s family.

The passage of time is apparent when her sister says her friend’s father is rationing food. Eventually, the government delivers food to homes via an interconnected tube system and drones.

A capitalist economy appears to continue under the new world order. Giovana and Yago purchase products through the tube system to cope with their isolation. Yago is financially strained because he must pay his father's nurse's salary, but is unable to work because he is a chiropractor. Giovana is a web developer and helps him financially.

Yago and Giovana's mostly platonic relationship gradually becomes more sexual. Despite sharing that she never wanted children, Giovana becomes pregnant. She gives birth to a boy with a doctor assisting with the delivery via video chat.

Their son, Lino, celebrates multiple birthdays in isolation. Giovana struggles with her mental health and feels that Yago is not aware of what is happening in the world. She follows the news online and seeks updates about the pink cloud. Yago, however, copes by hovering somewhere between denial and radical acceptance. To help her cope, Giovana and Yago try to develop a more intimate relationship, but Yago is not as committed as Giovana. Frustrated, Giovana says she wants to separate. They live separately on the two separate floors of the home, and Lino moves between them every 3 days. They rarely spend time together.

Giovana’s friend has now been alone in her home for years and is extremely depressed. Her doctor prescribes anti-depressants and she buys a robot dog. Giovana’s teenage sister, still isolated at her friend's slumber party, tells Giovana two of her friends are pregnant. The father of the other friend has been using them for sex. Giovana, horrified, offers to send them contraceptives.

Yago’s father is extremely ill and has stopped taking his meds because his nurse has died. Yago suspects his father killed the nurse because he had threatened to kill him previously. Yago stops calling his father because he doesn’t remember who Yago is.

Having been born indoors and never experienced the outside world, Lino doesn’t think of the pink cloud as a bad thing. Perhaps due to his son’s innocent appreciation of it, Yago begins to follow some kind of pink cloud-related religion that involves wearing a pink rope around his neck. He has come to fully accept his life at home with his son.

Yago begins to have sex with a woman online. Giovana has “window sex” with a neighbour. Eventually, Yago and Giovana get back together and they live as a family again. Lino and Yago buy Giovana a virtual reality headset and she quickly becomes addicted to it. She spends almost all of her time with the headset on the beach until Lino destroys it.

At one point it seems like there may be a chance the pink cloud is disappearing. A green cloud that looks like the northern lights appears in the sky in lieu of the pink cloud. Giovana fully believes she will be free, and is even packing and chatting with friends about meeting in person. After what seems to be a matter of days, the green cloud disappears, and for just a moment, the sky looks normal. Giovana is visibly elated, but within seconds the pink cloud returns.

Giovana walks out onto the balcony. She counts to ten and the scene ends before the pink cloud can have any effect on her.

== Release ==
The film had its world premiere in the World Cinema Dramatic Competition section of the Sundance Film Festival on 29 January 2021. It was released theatrically in Brazil on 26 August 2021 by O2 Play.

== Reception ==
On the review aggregator website Rotten Tomatoes, the film holds an approval rating of 93% based on 60 reviews, with an average rating of 7.3/10. The website's critics consensus reads, "An eerily relevant debut from writer-director Iuli Gerbase, The Pink Cloud reaches into the emotional fault lines of pandemic life and comes away with striking observations about human behavior."
