= Meetle Mice =

Studio album by Dan Deacon
- Released: 2003
- Recorded: 2003
- Genre: Electronic, noise, experimental
- Length: 62:16
- Label: Self-released as Carpark
- Producer: Dan Deacon

Dan Deacon chronology
Meetle Mice (2003)	Silly Hat vs. Egale Hat (2004)

Meetle Mice is a self-released studio album by electronic artist Dan Deacon. Released on CD-R in 2003, it is a compilation of student work featuring computer music and various live recordings by Deacon during his schooling in 2003 at Purchase College. In 2011, Carpark Records re-released the album on vinyl.

== Background ==
Looking back on the album in a 2011 interview with FACT Magazine, Deacon states: ”I was a very different musician back then trying to figure out how to interact with sound, what could be done with it, where it could go, learning music software for the first time, and discovering many more genres of experimental music than what I was exposed to in my youth on Long Island. It was an exciting time! Since then my aesthetic has shifted, my absurdist mindset subdued and I’ve been exposed to a global audience.”

== Track listing ==
1. "Sine Waves With Edited Vocals" – 2:10
2. "Never Do That" – 2:52
3. "Biggle Hat Was Ice–Cream Time (Card Shark Nose Nose)" – 6:40
4. "30" – 1:30
5. "Electronic With Clarinet And Bari Sax" – 3:06
6. "Song For Dina" – 4:28
7. "My Own Face Is F Word" – 5:20
8. "Drinking Out of Cups" – 2:43
9. "sdajhgthjk4gtjh4egwfhjdsgvnmxcbf4" – 7:38
10. "The Adventures Of Mr Bumbersine Featuring Dr Witherbean" – 3:33
11. "That's A Nice Shirt (Dad)" – 1:29
12. "Aerosmith Layer (Aerosmith Permanent Vacation 24162–2)" – 5:31
13. "Plums" – 2:37
14. "I'm So Gay With The Boner" – 2:03
15. "Aw Ah Ah Ah (Party Cakes)" – 1:43
16. "My Weasle Is Married" – 4:37
17. "I Have AIDS" – 2:42
18. "005 Sept22 BE" – 1:34
