= Ice Cream Spiritual =

Studio album by Ponytail
- Released: June 17, 2008
- Recorded: 2007, Baltimore
- Genre: Experimental rock; noise rock; math rock; post-rock
- Length: 33:58
- Label: We Are Free

Ponytail chronology
Kamehameha (2006)	Ice Cream Spiritual (2008)

Professional ratings
Aggregate scores
Source	Rating
Metacritic	82/100
Review scores
Source	Rating
AllMusic	4/5 stars
The A.V. Club	B+
Drowned in Sound	7/10
MSN Music (Consumer Guide)	A−
Pitchfork	8.4/10
The Skinny	4/5 stars
Spin	7/10
Tiny Mix Tapes	3.5/5 stars
Uncut	4/5 stars
Under the Radar	7/10

Ice Cream Spiritual is the second full-length studio album by Ponytail. The album, which was released June 17, 2008 has been both praised and criticized for the vocal styles of leader singer Willy Siegel, as they do not use conventional lyrics. The guitar work has drawn comparisons to math rock bands, while the vocals have drawn comparisons to Yoko Ono, for their experimental sound. The first single from the album was "Celebrate the Body Electric", which was released on April 29, 2008.

== Track listing ==
All songs written by Jeremy Hyman, Ken Seeno, Molly Siegel, and Dustin Wong.

1. "Beg Waves" - 4:07
2. "G Shock" - 3:02
3. "7 Souls" - 3:46
4. "Celebrate the Body Electric (It Came from an Angel)" - 7:00
5. "Late for School" - 4:16
6. "Sky Drool" - 3:28
7. "Small Wevs" - 3:30
8. "Die Allman Bruder" - 4:49
