= America (Dan Deacon album) =

Studio album by Dan Deacon
- Released: August 27, 2012
- Genre: Electronic
- Length: 43:05
- Label: Domino Records
- Producer: Chester Endersby Gwazda, Dan Deacon

Dan Deacon chronology
Bromst (2009)	America (2012)	Gliss Riffer (2015)

America is the third studio album by American electronic musician Dan Deacon, released August 27, 2012, on Domino Records. The album cover is a photo of Lake Placid in the US state of New York.

== Recording ==
=== Production ===
America was recorded using both electronic sounds and live recordings. An anechoic chamber was built in Baltimore to record the orchestral track "Rail". The reason Deacon decided to incorporate live instruments onto the album was that Deacon felt that electronic beats were limited by its lack of flaws and that he wanted the "slight imperfection in timing" human musicians have. Because he wanted the album to sound "more like a rock record" than an electronic one, Deacon enlisted King Crimson engineer Simon Heyworth to master the album.

=== Themes ===
In an interview with NPR, Deacon said that the album was inspired by the politics and geography of the United States, saying:

The music is definitely inspired by geography. I do many, many cross-country trips a year because I tour, and it's hard to — you could really despise every aspect of what you think American culture is but it's hard to deny that the land itself is beautiful. Do you know what I mean?

Deacon described the album as "political", saying that the lyrics were "inspired by my frustration, fear and anger towards the country and world I live in and am a part of." However, Deacon also said that he did not want the political nature to be overt, arguing that people do not respond to overt political messages.

=== Lyrics and inspirations ===
"Rail" was inspired by an empty train ride Deacon was on while traveling from Seattle to New York City. "Rail" was also inspired by an orchestral work Deacon wrote for the Kitchener-Waterloo Symphony. "Manifest" was about "figuring out where I fit in regards to the way my mind perceives me," while "True Thrush" was "about confusion and loss of self" and the "homogenization of culture." The track "USA I: Is A Monster" took its name from the rock band The USA Is a Monster.

== Release ==
The first song from the album, "Lots," was uploaded to SoundCloud by Domino Records on May 29, 2012. A second song, "True Thrush," was released on July 10, 2012. On July 18, 2012, a music video for "True Thrush" was released. The music video, directed by Ben O' Brien and Deacon, featured teams of people playing a skit-based game of telephone. On August 21, 2012, the album was streamed in its entirety on The Guardian.

Music from this album was used in the Adult Swim television series Off the Air for a special entitled "Dan Deacon: U.S.A.", which aired on July 6, 2013.

New York City Ballet resident choreographer Justin Peck used "USA I-IV" suite from America for his ballet The Times Are Racing, which had its premiere performance on January 26, 2017.

== Reception ==
Professional ratings
Aggregate scores
Source	Rating
AnyDecentMusic?	8.0/10
Metacritic	82/100
Review scores
Source	Rating
AllMusic	4.5/5 stars
The A.V. Club	A−
The Independent	4/5 stars
The Irish Times	5/5 stars
Mojo	4/5 stars
NME	8/10
Pitchfork	7.1/10
Q	4/5 stars
Rolling Stone	2.5/5 stars
Uncut	8/10

America has received mostly positive reviews. On the review site Metacritic, the album has a score of 82 out of 100, indicating "Universal acclaim."

Chris Mincher of The A.V. Club called America "one of the more thoughtful and complex albums so far this year." Mincher continued: "America ultimately embraces splendor and nobility, even as it acknowledges personal and social anxiety." AllMusic's Gregory Heaney also praised the album, writing "America's artful merging of the electronic and the acoustic shows that these tools we dedicate so much time and brain space to can also be used to create something free and emotionally invigorating. NME's John Calvert called America "a profound statement," writing "Deacon proves once and for all that there's nothing wrong with being cool, as long as you're awesome." Adam Kivel of Consequence of Sound wrote, "After taking in an album like this, there's no remaining uncertainty about how he got here. There should only be reveling in the achievement, the artistic growth, and the pleasure of the experience. This is a sonic representation of the grandeur of America as it stands, a classically inspired composition built with all the tools available." While criticizing the lyrics for being "hard to discern," Neil Ashman of Drowned in Sound concluded his review with: "No one concept album, even one with the complexity of America, could ever hope to fully address the manifold problems of the USA, but in searching for his own answers Dan Deacon has crafted an [sic] unique testament to this fact and to his own inimitable, and ever increasing, talents."

Not all reviews were entirely positive. Rolling Stone's Jon Dolan gave the album a mixed review, writing: "[T]he most enjoyable bits here are the least grandiose, like the zippy, pastoral 'True Thrush.'" Randall Roberts of the Los Angeles Times wrote: "[T]hough America is an explosive document, half the time it's a lot of smoke and bang, and it treads on territory that others have explored more thoughtfully." Pitchfork's Jess Harvell, while still giving the album a positive review, criticized the album's middle section, writing "It's the middle of the album that fizzles slightly after the bracing crunch and buzz of the first three songs ..."

== Track listing ==
No.	Title	Length
1.	"Guilford Avenue Bridge"	3:50
2.	"True Thrush"	4:44
3.	"Lots"	2:50
4.	"Prettyboy"	5:22
5.	"Crash Jam"	4:31
6.	"USA I: Is a Monster"	4:43
7.	"USA II: The Great American Desert"	7:10
8.	"USA III: Rail"	6:30
9.	"USA IV: Manifest"	3:24
Total length:		43:05

== Personnel ==
The following people contributed to America:

=== Musicians ===
- Sara Autrey - flute
- Zoe Band - alto
- Mia Barcia-Colombo - cello
- Dennis P. Bowen - percussion
- Gabriel Caballero - gello
- William Cashion - guitar (bass)
- Ali Clendaniel - soprano
- Dan Deacon - arranger, composer, electronics, engineer, mixing, producer, vocals
- Julienne Gede - soprano
- Rod Hamilton - percussion
- Christian Hizon - trombone (bass)
- Gerry Mak - viola
- Sophia Mak - violin
- Patrick McMinn - trumpet
- R.M. O'Brien - tuba
- Bijan Olia - orchestrator, conductor, copyist, piano
- Kevin O'Meara - percussion
- Rich O'Meara - percussion
- Nicole Papadatos - clarinet, clarinet (bass)
- Devlin Rice - composer, guitar (bass), guitar (electric)
- Victor Ruch - violin
- Rob Sirois - bassoon
- Andrew Smith - French horn
- Maureen Smith - alto

=== Additional personnel ===
- Rob Carmichael - design
- Griffin Cohen - assistant engineer
- Richard Endres - back cover photo, cover photo
- Dan Frome - assistant engineer
- Chester Endersby Gwazda - engineer, mixing, producer
- Simon Heyworth - mastering
- Andy Miles - mastering assistant
- Josh Sisk - photography

== Charts ==
Chart (2012)	Peak position
US Billboard 200	147
US Top Heatseekers	5
US Rock Albums	48
US Independent Albums	28
US Electronic Albums	5
