= Jimmy Joe Roche =

American film director

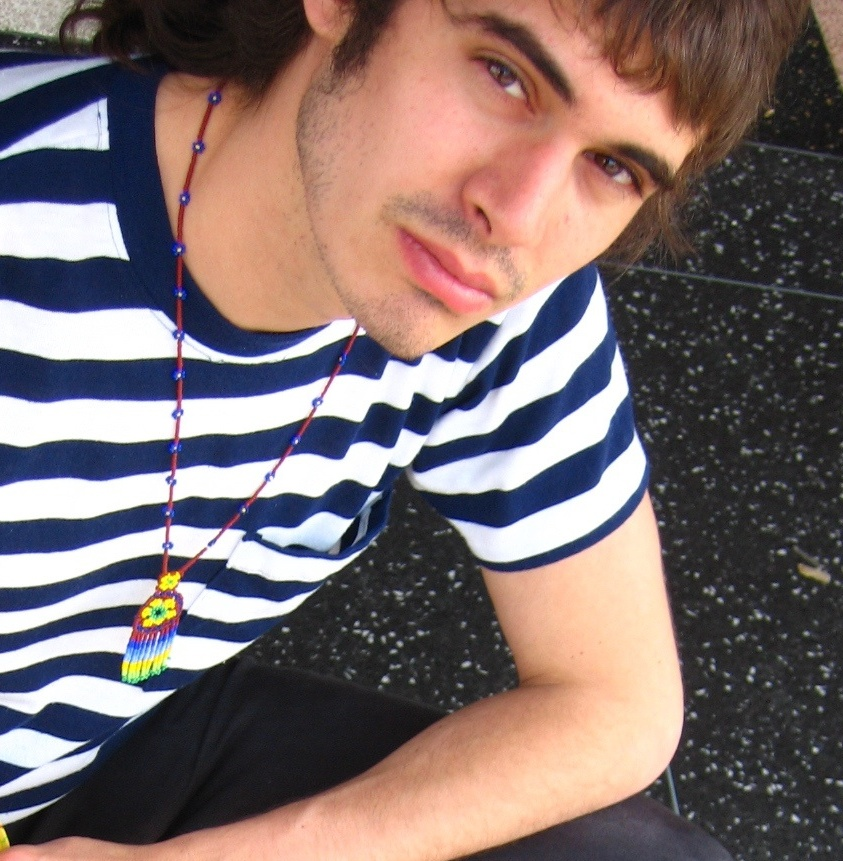
- Roche in 2007
- Born: James Joseph Roche; Tallahassee, Florida, United States
- Occupations: Visual artist, filmmaker, actor
- Years active: 2003–present
- Website: jimmyjoeroche.com

Jimmy Joe Roche is an American visual artist and underground filmmaker, based in Baltimore, Maryland. He is a long-time collaborator with Baltimore-based musician Dan Deacon.

== Career ==
Roche's works have been screened in venues and museums all over the U.S. and Canada including the Corcoran Museum of Art, Walters Art Museum, Anthology Film Archives, New York Underground Film Festival, Yale College, the Great American Music Hall, and San Francisco International Animation festival. His collaboration, Ultimate Reality, with musician Dan Deacon has gained national press attention.

Roche has also worked with the Academy Award-winning filmmaker Jonathan Demme, most recently acting in the film Rachel Getting Married. In 2006 he shot and edited the Neil Young "Heart of Gold: Behind the Scenes" featurette, and in 2003 he worked with Demme to create the journal for Corporal Melvin in the Paramount film The Manchurian Candidate.

Recently Roche's short film Baltimore Shopping Network was featured on the New Museum's website Rizhome, and his music video for Deacon's "Crystal Cat" was featured on the front page of YouTube, gathering over a million views. In June 2008 Roche had his first solo exhibition of his work at R.A.R.E Gallery in Chelsea, Manhattan.

Since 2011, Roche has curated and hosted the ongoing Gunky's Basement Film Series, a project of Maryland Film Festival, with his frequent collaborator, musician Dan Deacon. Starting in September 2012, he has also hosted and curated Maryland Film Festival's horror series "Night Zones With Jimmy Joe Roche".

== Education ==
Roche briefly attended SAIL High School in Tallahassee, FL. He later attended and received his BFA from SUNY Purchase in Film in 2004, and his MFA from the Maryland Institute College of Art in 2008.

== Selected works ==
=== Videography ===
- How to Make a Toothbeef Sandwich (2007)
- Freedom Was Made in 7 Days (2007)
- Lean Cuts For Osama Bin' (2007)
- Ultimate Reality (2007)
- Gather Round (2008)
- My Brother Wolf Spirit (2008)
- Back In Black (2008)
- Vortex Accumulator (2008)
- Organic Noise (2009)
- Basement Bleeds (2009)
- Earth Currents (2009)
- Sitting Still (2010)
- Peacing Out (2011)
- Static Sermon (2011)
- Neutral Death Test (2011)
- Homelands (2011)
- Pascal's Room (2011)
- Beamsplitter (2011)
- Rooster Bob's - Caffeinated Chicken (2011)
- Mad Max Noise Vest (2012)

=== Filmography ===
- Hilvarenbeek (2011)

=== Music videos ===
- "Crystal Cat" — Dan Deacon (2007)

== See also ==
- Music of Baltimore
- Dan Deacon
