= The Price of Milk (TV series) =

2025 American docuseries

- Genre: Environmental Politics
- Directed by: Nicholas Bruckman; Yoni Brook
- Composer: Dan Deacon
- Country of origin: United States
- Original language: English
- No. of seasons: 1
- No. of episodes: 4

Production
- Executive producers: Bryn Mooser; Justin Lacob; Matthew Cherchio
- Producers: Nicholas Bruckman; Yoni Brook; Jen Maylack; James Doolittle
- Cinematography: Yoni Brook
- Editors: Dita Gruze; Eileen Kennedy; Luke Northrop
- Production companies: People's Television; XTR

Original release
- Release: June 8, 2025

The Price of Milk is a 2025 American four-part docuseries directed by Nicholas Bruckman and Yoni Brook. The docuseries premiered as a special screening at the Tribeca Festival in June 2025.

== Premise ==
The series investigates the U.S. dairy industry, tracing the "Got Milk?" campaign's roots in the Dairy Checkoff program and its impact on farmers, consumers, and policy. It explores mega-farms, animal welfare, labor issues, environmental impacts, and racial disparities in dietary guidelines, using interviews, archival footage, and animations to reveal milk's cultural and economic complexities.

== Production ==
Nicholas Bruckman and Yoni Brook developed the series to explore the dairy industry's hidden stories, inspired by the "Got Milk?" campaign's cultural and economic impact. Produced with XTR, the project involved extensive research and shooting across Wisconsin farms, San Francisco ad agencies, and Washington policy offices. Principal photography spanned three years, with Yoni Brook as director of photography, capturing immersive visuals of milking operations and protest actions using multiple camera units. Drone footage highlighted the scale of industrial dairies, while animations by Harvey Benschoter illustrated historical campaigns like a reimagined "Uncle Sam Wants You to Drink Milk" poster.

== Release ==
The series had its world premiere as a 75-minute feature cut at the 2025 Tribeca Festival on June 6, 2025, in the "Special Screenings" section. The full four-part docuseries version is slated for distribution, with sales handled by Sub-Genre Media.

== Reception ==
Liz Wiest of Movie Jawn calling it “everything a docuseries should be. Immediately engaging, emotionally centered around compelling subjects, and disturbingly informative.” Kristin Ciliberto of Film Fest Report described the series as “surprising and insightful,” commending its romp from farms to the White House.

== Accolades ==
Year	Award	Category	Recipient(s)	Result	Ref.
2025	Rhode Island International Film Festival	Best TV Pilot	The Price of Milk	Won	
