= First Date (film) =

2021 film by Manuel Crosby and Darren Knapp

- Theatrical release poster
- Directed by: Manuel Crosby; Darren Knapp
- Written by: Manuel Crosby; Darren Knapp
- Produced by: Manuel Crosby; Charles Horak; Brandon Kraus; Darren Knapp; Lucky McKee
- Starring: Tyson Brown; Shelby Duclos; Jesse Janzen; Nicole Berry; Samuel Ademola
- Cinematography: Manuel Crosby
- Edited by: Manuel Crosby; Zach Passero
- Music by: Manuel Crosby; Kevin Kentera; Noah Lowdermilk
- Production companies: Visit Films; Cinexus Pictures
- Distributed by: Magnet Releasing
- Release dates: January 31, 2021 (Sundance); July 2, 2021 (United States)
- Running time: 103 minutes
- Country: United States
- Language: English
- Box office: $15,974

First Date is a 2021 American mystery comedy-drama film directed and written by Manuel Crosby and Darren Knapp in their feature directorial debuts. The film stars Tyson Brown, Shelby Duclos, Jesse Janzen, Nicole Berry and Samuel Ademola.

The film had its world premiere at the Sundance Film Festival on January 31, 2021, and was released in theaters and on Apple TV on July 2, 2021, in the United States by Magnet Releasing.

== Plot ==
Conned into buying a shady '65 Chrysler, Mike's first date with the girl-next-door, Kelsey, implodes as he finds himself targeted by criminals, cops, and a crazy cat lady. A night fueled by desire, bullets and burning rubber makes any other first date seem like a walk in the park.

— Variety.

== Cast ==
The cast includes:

- Tyson Brown as Mike
- Shelby Duclos as Kelsey
- Jesse Janzen as The Captain
- Nicole Berry as Sergeant Davis
- Samuel Ademola as Deputy Duchovny
- Ryan Quinn Adams as Vince
- Angela Barber as Ricky
- Josh Fesler as Brett
- Dave Reimer as Shannon
- Leah Finity as Darla
- Jake Howard as Donnie
- Scott E. Noble as Dennis
- Brittany Rietz as Confused Car Woman
- Nicholas Macias as Bystander
- Keldamuzik as Mike's Mom

== Release ==
The film had its premiere in the "Next" section of the Sundance Film Festival on January 31, 2021. A month later, the film's US distribution rights were acquired by Magnet Releasing, the genre film label of Magnolia Pictures, with plans to release it in theaters and on Apple TV in the United States on July 2, 2021.

== Reception ==
The film received mixed reviews from critics. On the review aggregator website Rotten Tomatoes, 51% of 47 critics' reviews are positive, with an average rating of 5.8/10. The website's consensus reads: "Although this First Date might have gone more smoothly, it remains an (occasionally very) funny crime caper -- and an intriguing calling card for debuting co-directors Manuel Crosby and Darren Knapp." Metacritic, which uses a weighted average, assigned the film a score of 52 out of 100, based on 11 critics, indicating "mixed or average" reviews.

Kristy Puchko of RogerEbert.com wrote: "Overall, this wild-ass comedy is a jolting thrill ride, packed with barbed jokes, hilarious characters, and threaded with a sweet and simple romance that pulls us through the wonkier bits. Simply put, First Date is a diamond in the rough, but a diamond nonetheless."

Danielle Solzman of Solzy at the Movies praised Crosby and Knapp's direction and positively compared the film to the work of Robert Rodriguez, Quentin Tarantino and the Coen Brothers, while further adding: "I've seen some beautiful films in the NEXT program and First Date could very well be the next hit to come from it. When we look back on this unique Sundance in a few years from now, we'll be able to say that's where Manuel Crosby and Darren Knapp were discovered."

John DeFore of The Hollywood Reporter was critical of the film, but praised the performances of Brown and Duclos, writing: "The film gets a bit more enjoyable as soon as the two share the screen together. But they have precious little time for flirty banter before Knapp and Crosby throw them back into action copped from other genre movies. This time it's a True Romance-like standoff between teams of heavily armed people arguing over drugs and money. It's amazing how much of this mayhem Mike survives before the script decides it's time for him to do something."
