= La Americana =

- Directed by: Nicholas Bruckman
- Release date: 2008
- Country: United States
- Languages: English; Spanish

La Americana is a feature documentary film directed and produced by Nicholas Bruckman. The film tells the story of a young undocumented immigrant in New York City who struggles to save the life of her ailing daughter in Bolivia. La Americana received numerous festival awards worldwide, including best documentary at the New York and Los Angeles Latino film festivals.

The film was broadcast on numerous television networks in Europe, Asia, and Latin America, and in 2012 aired nationwide in the US on National Geographic Mundo.
