= Drinking Out of Cups =

2003 song by Dan Deacon

Song by Dan Deacon

from the album Meetle Mice
- Released: 2003
- Genre: Spoken word
- Length: 2:43

"Drinking Out of Cups" is a spoken word song from electronic artist Dan Deacon's 2003 album Meetle Mice. The song has gone on to become an internet meme due in large part to the creation of an accompanying YouTube video of the same name.

== Video and LSD rumor ==
The track is a spoken free association description of various scenes in an exaggerated Long Island accent with no discernible association between topics. The song went relatively unknown until fellow musician Liam Lynch created a video for it in 2006. The video features an anthropomorphic lizard speaking the lyrics of the song with various scenes that are being described shown in the background. An urban legend surrounding the video supposed that the person speaking on the track was describing visual hallucinations during an LSD trip, a rumor that is also furthered in the description of the YouTube video itself. Dan Deacon has denied this rumor. He stated that he was describing various clips that he was watching in real time on television. Deacon has stated that he has never done LSD and that he was sober during the recording. The video has received millions of views on YouTube and is considered an internet meme.

== Use in Demolition ==
The song is used as a plot point in the 2015 film Demolition. Lyrics from the song are frequently cited throughout the movie. The main character's wife's last words before dying in the movie are "not my chair, not my problem"; a line from the song. Both characters are seen watching the YouTube video in flashbacks throughout the film.
