= The Complete Guide to Everything =

Culture and comedy podcast

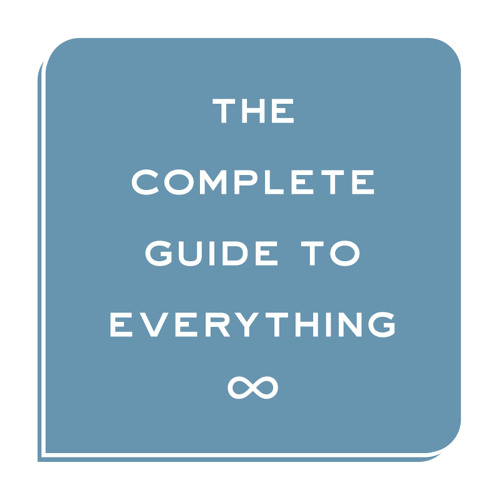
- Language: English

Cast and voices
- Hosted by: Tim Daniels; Tom Reynolds

Production
- Length: 60–90 minutes

Publication
- No. of episodes: 905 (as of November 15, 2026)
- Original release: July 2, 2009
- Updates: Weekly

Related
- Website: tcgte.com

The Complete Guide to Everything, sometimes abbreviated to TCGTE, is a weekly podcast hosted by Tom Reynolds and Tim Daniels of Brooklyn, New York. It is typically 60–90 minutes long and released weekly on Sundays. Most episodes cover one overarching topic, which serves as a jumping off point for off-topic conversations about cultural observations. This is often preceded or followed by recurring segments, such as "Tim and Tom Solve Your Problems".

== History ==
The first episode of The Complete Guide to Everything was released on July 2, 2009.

In the "International Travel" episode, the hosts discussed the theft of Daniels' property, a bag containing an iPad, MacBook, and speakers. While some speculation was made during the episode about the possible culprit, no arrests were made.

An official iPhone application giving access to every episode, the TCGTE blog, the host's blogs, the host's Twitter accounts and a messaging facility is available on the Apple App Store.

The first gathering of TCGTE fans took place at Porterhouse Brewery in Covent Garden, London in October 2010. The official TCGTE website refers to the gathering as "the first international meet up" of TCGTE fans.

In 2014 it was featured in an article in The Independent, which described it as "banal... and brilliant!"

=== Other podcasts ===
==== 24cast ====
Prior to TCGTE, Reynolds and Daniels hosted 24cast, which began in January 2006 and lasted 23 episodes. The podcast was primarily about the Fox television show 24, but frequently covered many other topics and issues. Episodes were released in a somewhat sporadic manner. The show also gathered a reputation within the 24 podcast community, where it frequently billed itself as the "only explicit podcast about 24."

==== The Drudge Report Report Report ====
Following up 24cast, the two created The Drudge Report Report Report. The four-episode series consists of hosts Reynolds, Daniels, and Chris reading articles from Drudge Report and making humorous comments about them.

==== Pop Everything ====
In The Complete Guide to Everything episode "Electronic Dance Music", Reynolds and Daniels announced they would be producing a new podcast that would focus more on popular culture topics like movies, books, comics, and TV. On October 17, 2013, the first episode of Pop Everything was released on iTunes and SoundCloud.

== Show segments ==
Some of the show's recurring segments include:

- "Tim and Tom Solve Your Problems" – Introduced in the episode "Life on the Road", the hosts answer emails from listeners asking for advice. The topics typically pertain to advice relating to social behavior or relationships. Of all of the show segments listed, "Tim & Tom Solve Your Problems" (sometimes referred to as "TandTSYP") is the most regular and longest running.
- "Fifty Shades of Tim" – Introduced in the episode "Fears: Elevators". After many weeks of Tom attempting to get Tim to read Fifty Shades of Grey in order to do an episode on the book, Tom finally begins summarizing the book to Tim chapter by chapter over the course of several episodes. The segment was discontinued due to the excessively graphic nature of the novel.
- "The Mundane Bucket List" – Introduced in the episode "Underwear", the "Mundane Bucket List" is a tongue-in-cheek take on a traditional bucket list. Each week, Tim and Tom take turns to propose something that they would really like to do before they die but would be considered by most people to be mundane.
- "The Gauntlet" – Introduced in the episode "Colon Health and Final Destination", the hosts run through a range of topic suggestions gathered from social media and forums. The hosts read through suggestions for future topics, often giving a quick opinion about the topic suggested. It was implied that topics that passed "the gauntlet" would go on to become future full length episodes, however the hosts have since announced this was never their true intention. The segment was later discontinued.
- "You're Awful" – Introduced in the episode "Public Services (Or An Excuse To Talk About Poop)", the hosts drew on reports from listeners of instances where they had pointed out to a member of the public that the behavior they had seen that person exhibit was unacceptable by saying "You're Awful"; as clarified in later episodes, the aim of the segment was to encourage listeners to point out to those people who should, and in fact do, know that the behavior is unacceptable in a social setting but have developed (often without realizing) a sense of being "above the rules", with businessmen and old ladies being specific examples cited. Over the course of several episodes, the segment morphed and began drawing on articles from The New York Times for further examples of "awful" behavior. The segment is also referred to as "A Particular Kind of Asshole You Didn't Know Existed Until The New York Times Pointed It Out To You." The segment recurs on an irregular basis.
