= Video mixtape =

Stock footage movie consisting of clips from movies, television or home videos

A video mixtape (VMT) is a stock footage movie consisting of clips from movies, television or home videos that are generally circulated as bootleg videos. Also called party tapes or video compilations, this phenomenon comes from the days of Betamax and VHS, when home editing and duplication became possible for the masses. Video mixtapes are distributed on VHS or DVD, or by one of the many distribution methods the internet has to offer. The concept and "feel" of a video mixtape is derived from the audio mixtape phenomenon.

== Content ==
Video mixtapes usually contain short clips from various sources. Favorite sources include "home-shopping channel and public-access television bloopers, scenes from sleazy splatter B-movies, amazing news footage, bizarre pornography, strange homemade video projects, extreme sports, disasters and mishaps captured on film, or foreign television gone mad. There has never been a set criteria for the footage that video enthusiasts collect."

== Mixtapes and internet culture ==
The emergence of high-speed internet provided an easy and cheap means to download and swap videos online. The ability to edit videos with free software on consumer computers no longer requires an expert to produce mixtapes. Most modern video mixtapes are released on DVD and through internet download. This can be in the shape of an ISO image of the DVD, video file, and streaming video.
