= Riddles (album) =

Studio album by Ed Schrader's Music Beat
- Released: March 2, 2018
- Genre: Post-punk
- Length: 39:22
- Label: Carpark
- Producer: Dan Deacon

Ed Schrader's Music Beat chronology
Party Jail (2014)	Riddles (2018)	Nightclub Daydreaming (2022)

Professional ratings
Aggregate scores
Source	Rating
AnyDecentMusic?	7/10
Metacritic	77/100
Review scores
Source	Rating
The 405	7.5/10
AllMusic	3.5/5 stars
Pitchfork	7.4/10
Under the Radar	8/10

Riddles is the third studio album by American rock duo Ed Schrader's Music Beat. The album features the single "Dunce". The album was produced and co-written by electronic-pop musician Dan Deacon.

== Reception ==
Riddles was met with "generally favorable" reviews from critics. At Metacritic, which assigns a weighted average rating out of 100 to reviews from mainstream publications, this release received an average score of 77 based on five reviews. Aggregate website AnyDecentMusic? gave the release a 7 out of 10 based on a critical consensus of five reviews.

Writing in Pitchfork's review of Riddles, Nina Corcoran described the collaboration between the band and producer Dan Deacon as "a new musical direction... By lacing arms with Dan Deacon, the duo throw themselves into an auspicious zone, creating an album that remains introspective even at its wildest moments."

=== Accolades ===
Publications' year-end list appearances for Riddles
Critic/Publication	List	Rank	Ref
Loud and Quiet	Loud and Quiet's Top 40 Albums of 2018	23	
Under the Radar	Under the Radar's Top 100 Albums of 2018	46	

== Track listing ==
Riddles track listing
No.	Title	Length
1.	"Dunce"	3:54
2.	"Seagull"	5:18
3.	"Riddles"	4:38
4.	"Dizzy Devil"	5:12
5.	"Wave to the Water"	2:24
6.	"Rust"	2:27
7.	"Kid Radium"	3:26
8.	"Humbucker Blues"	2:32
9.	"Tom"	4:04
10.	"Culebra"	5:27
