= Concrete TV =

- Country of origin: United States

Original release
- Release: 1994 – 2019

Concrete TV is a public-access television cable show in New York City that aired on Channel 67 public-access in Manhattan, combining violence, sex, pornography, new video, old video in a video art collage set to music. This half-hour program was produced by Ron Rocheleau, known as Concrete Ron. It was shown Friday nights at 1:30 a.m.

Episodes are heavily thematically based in 1980s video, hearkening back to the early MTV days, in a mash-up art style. In a 1997 interview with New York Magazine, Rocheleau stated that he sees himself "as a kind of Dr. Frankenstein trying to make super-television shows--hyperkinetic eye candy for a presweetened generation, a 'Best of' from our worst nightmares".

Concrete TV was later cited as a major inspiration on the Adult Swim program Off the Air, and Rocheleau has been called "the father of video collage".

The show remained on the air until ending in 2019.

== Reception ==
High Times described the show as "an improbably hysterical, liberating, delirious, irreverent, intelligent, and hypnotic juxtaposition of film clips set to equally random and fun music". Rolling Stone - which named Concrete TV the best television show of 1996 - stated that "In the tradition of dada and surrealism, Concrete TV turns popular art inside out and forces it to give up the secrets about the culture that spawned it. There are also lots of cool car crashes." BlackBook stated that "Concrete TV, on its best nights, is not only a poor man's commentary on contemporary American culture; it is a stimulus riot act which leaves you feeling exhausted and a wee bit dirty." Boing Boing described the show as "one noisy, violent, sexy, and brilliantly edited pop culture/infoporn mashup". Time Out New York stated that "Ron Rocheleau's quick-edit montage of car crashes, motorcycle crashes, and kung-fu fights is a favorite in bars, because it doesn't need sound to be completely understood."
