= Rat Film =

2016 American documentary by Theo Anthony

- Directed by: Theo Anthony
- Written by: Theo Anthony
- Produced by: Sebastian Pardo, Riel Roch Decter
- Cinematography: Theo Anthony
- Music by: Dan Deacon
- Production company: Memory
- Distributed by: Cinema Guild
- Release date: August 10, 2016 (Locarno Film Festival)
- Running time: 82 minutes
- Country: United States

Rat Film is a 2016 documentary directed by American filmmaker Theo Anthony employing techniques of essay and collage.

== Subject ==
The documentary uses rat infestation in Baltimore as a starting point to explore issues of segregation, redlining, poverty, and resource allocation in U.S. cities.

== Premiere and screening ==
The film had its world premiere at the 2016 Locarno Film Festival and its U.S. premiere within the 2017 True/False Film Festival, as well as screening at festivals such as the 2017 International Film Festival Rotterdam, the 2017 South by Southwest Film Conference & Festival, and the 2018 Copenhagen International Documentary Festival.

Rat Film had its television premiere as part of the PBS series Independent Lens on February 26, 2018.

== Nominations ==
Rat Film composer Dan Deacon was nominated for Outstanding Achievement in Original Music Score and director Theo Anthony was nominated for Outstanding Achievement in a Debut Feature Film at the 2018 Cinema Eye Honors.
