= Ed Schrader's Music Beat =

American two piece rock duo

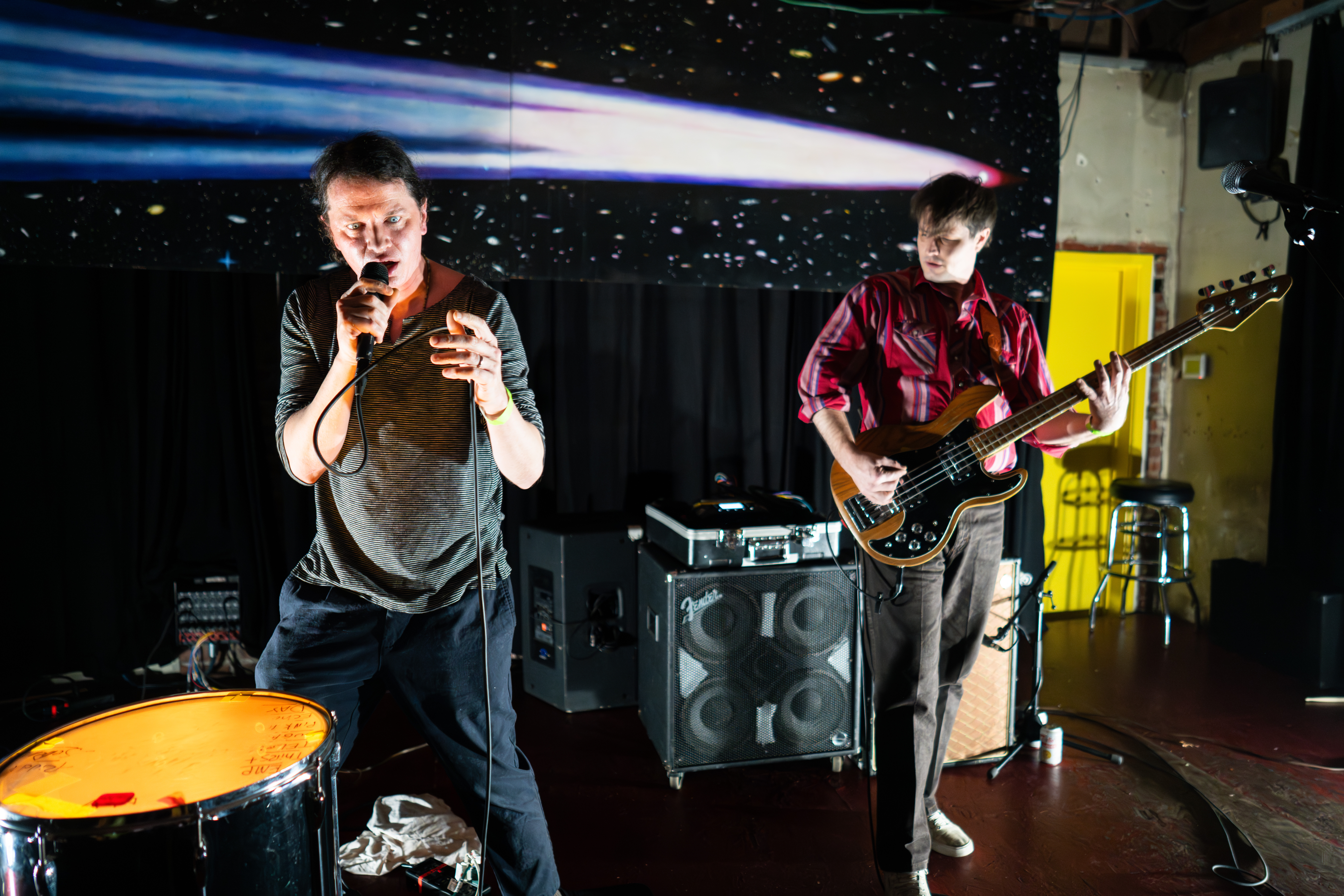
- Ed Schrader's Music Beat in Washington, DC, 2024

Background information
- Origin: Baltimore, Maryland, USA
- Genres: Indie rock; art punk; post-punk; minimalism
- Years active: 2009–present
- Members: Ed Schrader; Devlin Rice

Ed Schrader's Music Beat is an American two piece rock duo of Ed Schrader and Devlin Rice from Baltimore, Maryland. According to The Boston Hassle, the duo has "a gas pedal/brake pedal sonic narrative, careening without warning between cross-eyed tantrums and sultry, eyebrow-cocked croons." They have released albums on Infinity Cat Recordings, Load Records, Upset The Rhythm, and Famous Class Records. Touring with bands such as Future Islands, Ceremony, and Wye Oak, the duo has been described as "one of contemporary punk’s best examples of testing the possibilities" and has performed across the U.S. and Europe.

== History ==
In 2009, Ed Schrader started his solo career playing shows with just himself and a drum. He released a solo album, The Choir Inside, in which all the songs had just Schrader's voice and a floor tom in them. After touring for a while on his own, in 2010 Ed asked Devlin Rice to join them. Now, Ed plays drums and Devlin plays bass.

In 2012, Jazz Mind was released on Load Records and Upset the Rhythm. Joe Hemmerling from Tiny Mix Tapes called it "one of the oddest albums to land on my desk this year" and "a tasty little album." The duo went on "Because Home Sucks, and Everywhere Else Is the Same" a.k.a. "Jazz Mind Nation" tour with Lord Grunge, Psychedelic Horseshit, Wet Hair, and Bubbly Mommy Gun in support of Jazz Mind. Their second U.S. tour, "Would You Make Us the Happiest Band in the World!" North American Dumber Tour started in Richmond, Virginia at Strange Matter and ended in Cleveland, Ohio at Now That's Class. In October 2012, Ed Schrader's Music Beat had their first European tour traveling to London, Manchester, and Paris. In the beginning of 2013, the duo toured New England. They put on the Ed Schrader Show at the Metro Gallery with guests special guests MATMOS and DDM.

Two years later, the duo released signed to Infinity Cat Recordings, citing the independent label's "ethics and approach" as a good fit for the band. Party Jail—their first album on their new label—was streamed in full on Spin Magazine before its release and described as "a brassy adventure in minimalism." The duo opened for Future Islands on their 2014 U.S. and European tour with Wye Oak before going on their own headlining tour. The first single "Televan" debuted on Spin, who wrote that "a minute-and-a-half's worth of irresistible, in-your-face post-punk in its stead.". The song reached over 100,000 plays in the first 24 hours of being posted. A music video for "Televan" followed soon after. The Washington Post named "Radio Eyes," another single from Party Jail, one of their top singles of 2014. Impose Magazine named Party Jail one of the best albums of 2014, saying "In this short period of time [thirteen songs/twenty-six minutes], it courses through many dualities with ease, crafting little utopias and then directly following them with dystopian realizations."

In July 2014, "Laughing," a 7" which contains a previously unreleased B-side track called "Bedouin Tramps" was released on Infinity Cat Recordings. It has an "off-kilter propulsive beat" that "will make you want to get all sweaty and bust a move in someone’s basement party." After its release, the duo toured the East Coast with Chain and the Gang. They also toured with What Cheer? Brigade, Dope Body, and Sex Jams.

In September 2014, the Baltimore City Paper voted them as the Best Band in Baltimore.

In December 2014, the single "Sermon" was featured in Alan Resnick's short film Unedited Footage of a Bear, airing on Cartoon Network's Adult Swim block. In October 2017, the song "Humbucker Blues" from the then-upcoming Riddles was used for the Adult Swim/Wham City streaming mini-series The Cry of Mann: A Trool Day Holiday Spectacular.

In March 2018, the group released their third album Riddles, featuring the single "Dunce". The album was produced and co-written by Dan Deacon. Writing in Pitchfork's review of Riddles, Nina Corcoran described this collaboration as "a new musical direction... By lacing arms with Dan Deacon, the duo throw themselves into an auspicious zone, creating an album that remains introspective even at its wildest moments."

== Support tours and shows ==
- Dan Deacon
- Future Islands
- Beach House
- Ceremony
- Wye Oak
- Chain and the Gang
- Dope Body
- Thurston Moore
- New England Patriots
- Celebration
- Sex Jams
- Ski Mask
- Whore Paint
- Lorde Grunge
- Psychedelic Horseshit
- Wet Hair
- Bubbly Mommy Gun
- What Cheer? Brigade
- Man Man
- A Place to Bury Strangers
- Melt-Banana

== Discography ==
=== Albums ===
- Jazz Mind (March 20, 2012)
1. "Sermon" – 1:09
2. "Gem Asylum" – 2:32
3. "Traveling" – 1:57
4. "Right" – 2:28
5. "Do the Maneuver" – 2:04
6. "Rats" – 1:43
7. "My Mind is Broken" – 1:52
8. "When I'm In a Car" – 1:14
9. "Air Show / Can't Stop Eating Sugar" – 4:38
10. "Gas Station Attendant" – 0:59
- Party Jail (May 20, 2014) (ICR-83)
1. "Pantomime Jack" – 2:03
2. "Pink Moons" – 2:08
3. "Emperor's New Chair" – 1:27
4. "Televan" – 1:25
5. "Clock Weather" – 2:48
6. "Radio Eyes" – 2:02
7. "Cold Right Hand" – 2:13
8. "No Fascination" – 1:23
9. "Laughing" – 2:06
10. "Signs" – 1:33
11. "Desire Post" – 2:25
12. "Pilot" – 1:49
13. "Weekend Train" – 2:17
- Riddles (March 2, 2018)
1. "Dunce" - 3:54
2. "Seagull" - 5:18
3. "Riddles" - 4:38
4. "Dizzy Devil" - 5:12
5. "Wave to the Water" - 2:24
6. "Rust" - 2:27
7. "Kid Radium" - 3:26
8. "Humbucker Blues" - 2:32
9. "Tom" - 4:04
10. "Culebra" - 5:27
- Nightclub Daydreaming (March 25, 2022)
1. "Pony in the Night" - 3:18
2. "This Thirst" - 4:02
3. "Eutaw Strut" - 3:06
4. "European Moons" - 4:10
5. "Hamburg" - 4:08
6. "Black Pearl" - 3:01
7. "Echo Base" - 3:29
8. "Skedaddle" - 4:52
9. "Berliner" - 4:22
10. "Kensington Gore" - 2:51

=== 7" ===
- "Laughing" (July 29, 2014) (ICR-86)
1. "Laughing" – 2:06
2. "Bedouin Tramps" – 1:31
