= Time Trial (film) =

- Directed by: Finlay Pretsell
- Produced by: Sonja Henrici
- Starring: David Millar
- Cinematography: Martin Radich
- Edited by: Kieran Gosney & Dino Jonsater
- Music by: Dan Deacon
- Release dates: 19 November 2017 (IDFA Festival); 5 July 2018
- Running time: 82 minutes
- Country: United Kingdom
- Language: English

Time Trial is a 2017 British documentary film directed by Finlay Pretsell. The film focuses on the final season of David Millar's professional cycling career. The film covers events including the 2014 Tour de France, the 2014 Giro d'Italia and the 2014 Milan–San Remo.

== See also ==
- List of films about bicycles and cycling
