= All Light, Everywhere =

- Theatrical release poster
- Directed by: Theo Anthony
- Written by: Theo Anthony
- Produced by: Riel Roch-Decter; Sebastian Pardo; Jonna McKone
- Cinematography: Corey Hughes
- Edited by: Theo Anthony
- Music by: Dan Deacon
- Production companies: MEMORY; Sandbox Films
- Distributed by: Super LTD
- Release dates: January 31, 2021 (Sundance); June 4, 2021 (United States)
- Running time: 109 minutes
- Country: United States
- Language: English
- Box office: $37,266

All Light, Everywhere is a 2021 American documentary film written and directed by Theo Anthony. It follows the biases on how humans see things, focusing primarily on the use of police body cameras.

The film had its world premiere at the Sundance Film Festival on January 31, 2021, where the film won the U.S. Documentary Special Jury Award for Nonfiction Experimentation. It was released on June 4, 2021, by Super LTD.

== Synopsis ==
The film follows the biases inherent to the way humans physically see the world, focusing primarily on the usage of police body cameras and other forms of police surveillance, but also tracing studies of solar eclipses as well as the parallel development of automatic weapons with the motion picture camera.

== Release ==
The film had its world premiere at the Sundance Film Festival on January 31, 2021. Shortly after, Super LTD, the boutique film division of Neon, acquired U.S. distribution rights to the film. It was released on June 4, 2021.

== Reception ==
All Light, Everywhere received positive reviews from film critics. It holds a 93% rating on review aggregator website Rotten Tomatoes, based on 57 reviews, with a weighted average of 7.90/10. The site's critical consensus reads, "All Light, Everywhere poses thought-provoking questions about our view of objective reality -- and the implications for our growing reliance on surveillance technology". On Metacritic, the film holds a rating of 74 out of 100, based on 9 critics, indicating "generally favorable" reviews. The Hollywood Reporter picked the film to be among the best of films released so far in 2021 as of early July 2021. In June 2025, IndieWire ranked the film at number 30 on its list of "The 100 Best Movies of the 2020s (So Far)."
