= Theo Anthony =

American film director

- Born: United States
- Occupation: Filmmaker
- Website: theoanthony.net

Theo Anthony is an American film director, editor, and cinematographer from Baltimore, Maryland known for his documentary films, including 2016's Rat Film. His 2021 film All Light, Everywhere won the U.S. Documentary Special Jury Award for Nonfiction Experimentation at the Sundance Film Festival. Anthony's work draws inspiration from the experimental film essays of directors such as Harun Farocki and Chris Marker.

== Life and career ==
Anthony grew up in Baltimore, Maryland, and studied cinema theory and creative writing at Oberlin College.

In 2014, he attended Werner Herzog's Rogue Film School, and released his breakthrough short film Chop My Money. Chop My Money, Anthony's first short to play film festivals, was shot in the Eastern Congo, featured music by Dirty Beaches, and premiered at the Toronto International Film Festival before being named a Vimeo Staff Pick and being featured by The Atlantic.

In 2015, Anthony was named one of the "25 New Faces of Independent Film" by Filmmaker Magazine, and completed the short film Peace in the Absence of War, which premiered at the 2016 International Film Festival Rotterdam and immersed the viewer in the 2015 Baltimore protests following the police killing of Freddie Grey.

Anthony made his feature-film debut in 2016 with Rat Film, which had its world premiere at the 2016 Locarno Film Festival and its U.S. premiere at the 2017 True/False Film Festival. Rat Film used the issue of rat infestation in Baltimore as a window into a non-fiction exploration of the city's history of racial segregation and redlining and persistent systemic issues of inequality. The film went on to screen at festivals such as the 2017 International Film Festival Rotterdam, the 2017 South by Southwest Film Conference & Festival, and the 2018 Copenhagen International Documentary Festival, and had its television premiere as part of the PBS series Independent Lens on February 26, 2018. Anthony was nominated for Outstanding Achievement in a Debut Feature Film and Rat Film composer Dan Deacon was nominated for Outstanding Achievement in Original Music Score at the 2018 Cinema Eye Honors. “Rat Film” was also nominated for Best Documentary and the Audience Award at the 2017 Gotham Awards.

Anthony's next film, the ESPN 30 for 30 documentary Subject to Review, premiered at the 2019 New York Film Festival and examined the Hawk-Eye computer-vision system's use in officiating the sport of tennis. Subject to Review continued the ongoing collaboration between Anthony and composer Dan Deacon which began with Rat Film.

In 2020, it was announced that Anthony's next feature film would be entitled All Light, Everywhere and explore issues of subjective perception and fallibility in both human and technological modes of surveillance. All Light, Everywhere was selected to premiere at the 2021 Sundance Film Festival in its U.S. Documentary Competition slate.

== Filmography ==
Short Films

- Chop My Money (2014) - director, writer, editor, cinematographer
- Peace in the Absence of War (2015) - director, writer, editor, cinematographer
- Subject to Review (2019) - director, writer, editor, cinematographer

Feature films

- Rat Film (2016) - director, writer, editor, cinematographer
- All Light, Everywhere (2021) - director, writer, editor
