= Spiderman of the Rings =

Studio album by Dan Deacon
- Released: May 8, 2007
- Genres: Electronica, noise
- Length: 46:10
- Label: Wildfire Wildfire under exclusive license to Carpark Records
- Producer: Dan Deacon

Dan Deacon chronology
Acorn Master (2006)	Spiderman of the Rings (2007)	Bromst (2009)

Spiderman of the Rings is the first studio album by the American electronic musician Dan Deacon, released by Carpark Records on May 8, 2007. The album was released on white vinyl by Wildfire Wildfire Records.

== Track listing ==
1. "Wooody Wooodpecker" — 3:50
2. "The Crystal Cat" — 3:53
3. "Wham City" — 11:45
4. "Big Milk" — 4:25
5. "Okie Dokie" — 2:37
6. "Trippy Green Skull" — 4:00
7. "Snake Mistakes" — 4:11
8. "Pink Batman" — 5:04
9. "Jimmy Joe Roche" — 5:58

== Reception ==
Professional ratings
Review scores
Source	Rating
AllMusic	3.5/5 stars
The Guardian	4/5 stars
NME	(11/17/2007, p.53)
Pitchfork	(8.7/10)
PopMatters	7/10 stars
Stylus	(B+)

Ben Thompson of The Guardian wrote, "This remorselessly entertaining debut album from the Baltimore-based laptop star will take you on a reckless joyride. Filtering the doo-wop aesthetic of Sha Na Na through the celestial aspirations of 'Electricity'-era OMD, Deacon's judicious blend of gleefully simplistic pop melodies, overloading old-school keyboard sounds and unfettered mass hysteria climaxes in the 12-minute epic 'Wham City'." The single from this album, "The Crystal Cat," was #84 on Rolling Stone's list of the 100 Best Songs of 2007, and "Wham City" was #30 on Pitchfork's "Top 100 Tracks of 2007."

== Personnel ==
Musicians

- Dan Deacon – Primary Artist
- Adam Endres – Vocals
- Dina Kelberman – Vocals
- Connor Kizer – Vocals
- Ed Schrader – Vocals

Production

- OCDJ – Producer
- Kevin O’Meara – Production Assistant
