= Ponytail (band) =

American rock band

- Origin: Baltimore, Maryland, United States
- Genres: Art rock
- Years active: 2005-2011
- Labels: We Are Free; Creative Capitalism; Monitor Records; Gaarden Records
- Past members: Dustin Wong; Jeremy Hyman; Ken Seeno; Willy Siegel; Michael Petruzzo

Ponytail was an American four-piece art rock band formed in Baltimore, Maryland, U.S. The group featured vocalist Willy Siegel, guitarists Dustin Wong and Ken Seeno, and drummer Jeremy Hyman. The band has toured internationally, with bands such as Battles, Hella, Don Caballero, High Places and others. They have released three albums, Kamehameha, Ice Cream Spiritual, and Do Whatever You Want All The Time. They were named "Best Live Band" by Baltimore City Paper in September 2007 and "Best Band" in September 2008

== History ==
In January 2005, the band came together originally as a 5-piece, incorporating Wong, Hyman, Seeno, Siegel and Petruzzo. The group was originally assembled by their professor for an assignment to start a band. Seeno recalls; "He put me and the drummer Jeremy [Hyman] together because we were the youngest. He put Dustin [Wong] with us because he was oldest in the class. And then he put this guy Michael Petruzzo with us, he was wearing a Destiny's Child t-shirt, I remember that. And then Willy was the last one to get picked." After talking about their favorite music, the group started playing together, with the experienced musicians Hyman, Wong and Seeno playing off the freeform noise made by Petruzzo and Siegel. Petruzzo eventually left the band, which led to them focusing more on melody with Siegel as their frontman.

Kamehameha was released in vinyl on Friday, April 17, 2006, on Portland, Oregon-based label Gaarden Records.

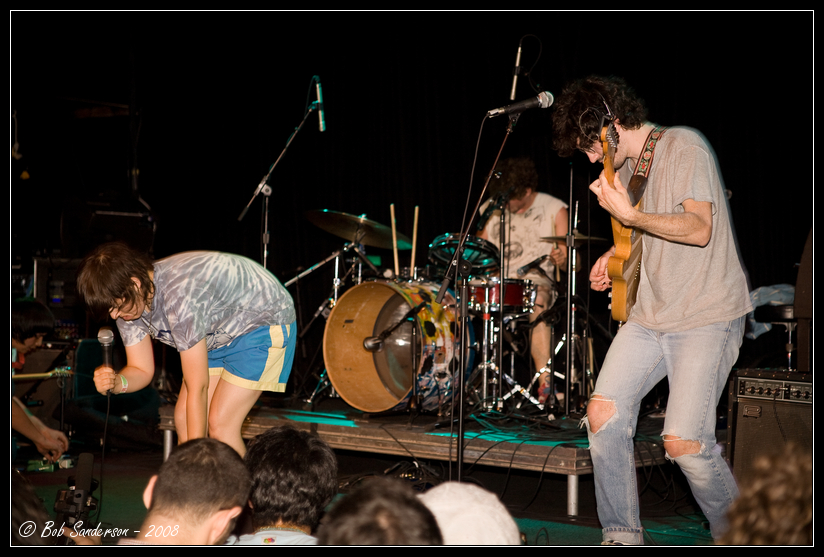
After the Jump Fest, Williamsburg, Brooklyn, NY 6/21/08 . Photo by Bob Sanderson

In mid-June 2008, Ponytail released their second full-length, Ice Cream Spiritual to positive reviews. The band has been praised for their energetic, 'sugar-rush type' performances by BBC as well as Pitchfork Media. Wong left Ecstatic Sunshine in 2009 to fully focus on Ponytail. The band toured internationally throughout Europe, USA, Australia, and New Zealand in promotion of their latest record. The band was also chosen by Matt Groening to perform at the edition of the All Tomorrow's Parties festival which he curated in May 2010 in Minehead, England. Ponytail went on hiatus in August 2010. Wong published a solo-album Infinite Love in October 2010. A 40-minute piece cut into 15 tracks and then re-done on a 2nd CD. This instrumental release appeared on Thrill Jockey. Although Dustin Wong had announced that Whartscape 2010 in Baltimore, Maryland would be their last show, a new album was announced. The band released their third full-length album, titled Do Whatever You Want All The Time, in April 2011. The cover art that was designed by Yamantaka Eye of the Japanese rock band Boredoms. The band officially broke up on September 22, 2011.

== Discography ==
=== Albums ===
- Kamehameha (We Are Free, November 22, 2006)
- Ice Cream Spiritual (We Are Free, June 17, 2008)
- Do Whatever You Want All The Time (We Are Free, April 12, 2011)

=== Singles ===
- "Celebrate the Body Electric (It Came from An Angel)" (We Are Free. April 29, 2008)
