= Dan Deacon =

American musician (born 1981)

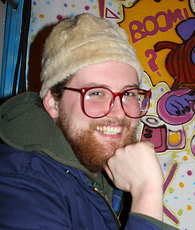
- Deacon in 2008

Background information
- Also known as: Pardalince Bird
- Born: Daniel Deacon; August 28, 1981 (age 45); West Babylon, New York, United States
- Origin: Baltimore, Maryland, United States
- Genres: Experimental, electronic, experimental pop, psychedelic
- Instruments: Vocals, keyboards, synthesizer, guitar, trombone, tuba
- Years active: 2003–present
- Labels: Domino, Carpark, Milan Records, Mistletone Records, Wildfire Wildfire Records, Psych-o-Path, Standard Oil Records, Comfort Stand Records
- Members: Dan Deacon
- Past members: Chester Gwazda; Jeremy Hyman; Kevin O'Meara; Denny Bowen; Dave Jacober; William Cashion; Gerrit Welmers; Jordan Kasey; Benny Boeldt; Andrew Bernstein; Ryan Syrell; Greg Fox; Kate Levitt; Sam Sowyrda; Stephe Cooper; Justin Frye; Andrew Burt; Josh Quillen; Adam Sliwinski; Jason Treuting; Eric Beach
- Website: http://www.dandeacon.com

Daniel Deacon (born August 28, 1981) is an American composer and electronic musician based in Baltimore, Maryland.

Deacon is known for his live shows, where large-scale audience participation and interaction are often major elements of the performance. Since 2003, he has released five solo albums, including 2015's Gliss Riffer, released by Domino Records. His work as a film composer includes scoring the 2021 documentaries All Light, Everywhere and Ascension, both released as soundtrack albums by Milan Records, as well as Francis Ford Coppola's Twixt (with Osvaldo Golijov), Hustle, Venom: The Last Dance, and the HBO series Task. His fifth solo studio album, titled Mystic Familiar, was released January 31, 2020, on Domino.

== Life and education ==
Daniel Deacon was born and raised in West Babylon, New York on Long Island. He graduated from Babylon High School in 1999 where he was a member of the local ska band Channel 59 alongside Tim Daniels of The Complete Guide to Everything. He later attended the Conservatory of Music at State University of New York at Purchase in Purchase, New York where, in addition to performing his solo material, he played in many bands, including tuba for Langhorne Slim and guitar in the improvisational grindcore band, Rated R, and had a small mixed chamber ensemble. He completed his graduate studies in electro-acoustic and computer music composition. He studied under composer and conductor Joel Thome and Dary John Mizelle.

In 2004 he moved to Baltimore, Maryland and moved into the Copycat Building and, along with friends from SUNY Purchase, formed Wham City, an art collective.

== Career ==
=== Early student work ===
His first two releases as a solo musician, Meetle Mice and Silly Hat vs Egale Hat were released on CD-R on Standard Oil Records in 2003 while he was a student at SUNY Purchase. The albums are collections of both computer music and live recordings of ensemble pieces, and are markedly different from the electronic-pop body of work that began with his first popular record, 2007's Spiderman of the Rings, in that most of the pieces are instrumentals and sound collages, and they contain almost no tracks where Deacon sings or uses vocal manipulation.

He followed those two albums with a set of records made up of sine wave compositions, Green Cobra Is Awesome Vs The Sun and Goose on the Loose. His next two releases were the EPs Twacky Cats on Comfort Stand Recordings and Acorn Master on Psych-o-path Records.

=== Studio albums ===
Spiderman of the Rings was Deacon's first commercially distributed full-length album, released by Carpark Records in May 2007. The album was well received and was included in the Best New Music section of Pitchfork. The album was ranked as number 24 on the website's "Top 50 Albums of 2007". Spiderman of the Rings marked the beginning of Deacon's body of recorded work as an electronic-pop musician; Deacon has stated the success of this record "completely changed my life in every possible way."

The collaborative video-art piece Ultimate Reality was released as a DVD in November 2007 by Carpark Records and marked a return to composing music for others to perform. The pieces for percussion and electronics were performed by Jeremy Hyman of Ponytail and Kevin Omeara of Videohippos. The sonic pieces were set to collaged and heavily altered video created by Deacon's long time friend and collaborator Jimmy Joe Roche.

Deacon's next album, entitled Bromst, was released on March 24, 2009. It was produced by Chester Gwazda at Snow Ghost Studios in Whitefish, Montana and features live instruments including player piano and a variety of percussion instruments. The album was well received; Pitchfork gave it an 8.5/10 and placed it into the "best new music" section. The album placed 46th among Pitchfork's "Top 50 Albums of 2009".

His album America was released on August 28, 2012, on Domino Records in the US. Deacon has described the album as representing his conflicted feelings toward the country and world he calls home: "The inspiration for the music was my love of cross-country travel, seeing the landscapes of the United States, going from east to west and back again over the course of seasons. "The lyrics are inspired by my frustration, fear and anger towards the country and world I live in and am a part of. As I came closer to finishing the album these themes began to show themselves more frequently and greater clarity. There seemed no better world to encapsulate both inspirations than the simple beauty found in the word America."

Gliss Riffer was released on Domino Records on February 24, 2015. Deacon describes the album title as "something that auto-correct wants to make sure that no one can actually type." The album was produced by Deacon alone, who notes that he created the album "trying to confront my own anxieties or insecurities and the stresses in my life." Gliss Riffer yielded the singles "Feel the Lightning" and "Learning to Relax", as well as a viral video animated in the exquisite corpse style for "When I Was Done Dying", produced by Adult Swim and featuring the work of nine different animators. "When I Was Done Dying" plays at the end of the HBO docuseries The Dark Wizard (2026), which chronicles the life and death of Dean Potter, an extreme athlete known for free-solo rock climbing, highlining, BASE jumping, and wingsuit flying. The song echos faintly Neutral Milk Hotel's "Marching Theme" from On Avery Island. Gliss Riffer received four-star reviews from both The Guardian and AllMusic. In his A− review of the album for Consequence of Sound, Derek Staples noted that "the universal motifs of his discography are now refracted through a more personal lens", and praised the record's "new lyrical depth".

In 2017, Deacon released a 10th-anniversary edition of Spiderman of the Rings that also included the soundtrack to 2007's Ultimate Reality.

Deacon produced and co-wrote the album Riddles by Ed Schrader's Music Beat, released March 2, 2018, on Carpark Records. Writing for NPR's All Songs Considered, Bob Boilen described Riddles as "a fascinating piece of work that is both ugly and beautiful, often at the same time", likening its sound to late-1970s records by Suicide and Pere Ubu. Nina Corcoran noted in Pitchfork that "You can hear Deacon's style, especially that of 2012's America, all over this album: the gleeful piano fluttering in 'Riddles,' the manic percussion buried in fuzz on 'Dizzy Devil,' the thick wall of synth on 'Kid Radium.'"

Deacon's fifth studio album, Mystic Familiar, was released on January 31, 2020. A first video from the album, for the song "Sat By a Tree" starring Aparna Nancherla, was released October 29, 2019. The second single from Mystic Familiar, "Become a Mountain", was released on January 13, 2020, with a video by animation studio Rapapawn. In his 4-star review for AllMusic, Paul Simpson characterized Mystic Familiar as Deacon's return to "majestically arranged synth pop", characterizing its arrangements as "driving and full of excitement" and finding the album's lyrical themes of nature and inner peace "encouraging and empowering without relying on self-help clichés." For Under the Radar, Scott Dransfield noted that Mystic Familiar is "far and away his most personal work yet", and concluded that "the best thing about Mystic Familiar is how the beautiful composition of the music reinforces the power of the lyrics' message."

Deacon's remix of the Future Islands single "For Sure" premiered on January 19, 2021.

=== Contemporary classical work ===
In 2011, Deacon began to work more outside of the indie and pop music scenes and began working in the contemporary classical scene and film scoring.

On January 20, 2011, Deacon and percussion quartet So Percussion premiered a new piece composed by Deacon titled "Ghostbuster Cook: Origin of the Riddler" at the Merkin Concert Hall in New York as part of the Ecstatic Music Festival. New York magazine listed the performance as one of the top 10 classical music performances of 2011. "Ghostbuster Cook" was also performed at The Barbican for the Steve Reich Reverberations Festival, May 7, 2011. On February 3–4 the Kitchener-Waterloo Symphony conducted by Edwin Outwater premiered Deacon's first orchestral works, "Fiddlenist Rim" and "Song of the Winter Solstice for orchestra and electronics".

On January 21, 2011, it was announced that Deacon would score the film Twixt by Francis Ford Coppola. On August 1, 2011 "Purse Hurdler", a composition for a 27-person percussion ensemble, was premiered by the So Percussion Summer Institute at Le Poisson Rouge in New York City.

On March 2, 2012, Deacon performed with So Percussion at the Royal Conservatory of Music in Toronto Canada. His compositions "Take A Deep Breath" and "Bottles" from "Ghostbuster Cook: Origin of the Riddler" were performed.

On March 20, 2012, Deacon premiered a new composition for a chamber orchestra titled "An Opal Toad with Obsidian Eyes". The piece was premiered at the 2012 Ecstatic Music Festival and was performed by the Calder Quartet, NOW Ensemble and Deacon on electronics controlling a Disklavier player piano. The piece was met with positive reviews.

Deacon made his Carnegie Hall debut on March 26, 2012, as part of the Carnegie Hall's American Mavericks series with So Percussion and Matmos. The concert was a tribute to composer John Cage to celebrate his 100th birthday. The program contained compositions by Cage and others influenced by the composer, including two works by Deacon, "Take A Deep Breath" and "Bottles" from "Ghostbuster Cook: Origin of the Riddler". This concert was also met with positive reviews.

In July 2013, Deacon performed with the Kronos Quartet as part of their "Kronos at 40" series of concerts at Lincoln Center. The quartet and Deacon performed the world premiere of his composition "Four Phases of Conflict" on the evening of July 28, 2013.

New York City Ballet resident choreographer Justin Peck and Deacon collaborated on "The Times Are Racing", a ballet piece set to Deacon's four-part "USA I-IV" suite from his album America. "The Times Are Racing" had its premiere performance on January 26, 2017.

Deacon collaborated with the Baltimore Symphony Orchestra in the Joseph Meyerhoff Symphony Hall for an evening of performance and curation on January 17, 2019. The evening consisted of three sets: the orchestra presenting a selection of classic works co-curated by Deacon, including pieces by Erik Satie and Du Yun; a solo set by Deacon; and a collaborative set with Deacon and members of the orchestra playing expanded arrangements of Deacon's music. This concert was named Best Concert of the year in Baltimore magazine's annual Best of Baltimore issue.

=== Live shows ===
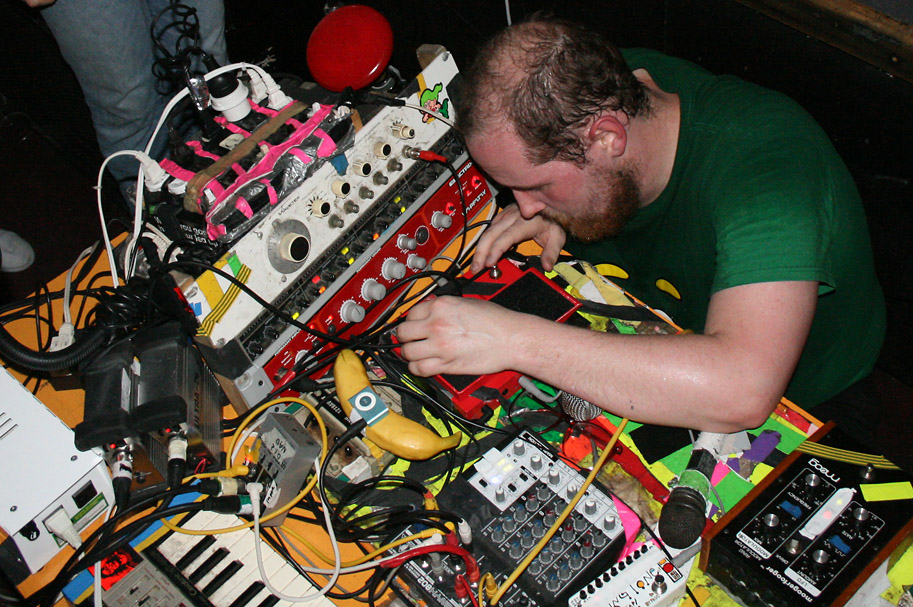
Dan Deacon's equipment, February 26, 2008

Deacon's reputation was birthed by his live shows. When playing solo he usually performs on floor level within the audience, his musical devices being set up on a low table, and surrounded by the crowd. In stark contrast to Deacon's electronic performances, the Bromst tour was with a 14-person ensemble of members of various Baltimore bands including So Percussion, Future Islands, and Chester Gwazda. He was accompanied by various acts including Nuclear Power Pants. This tour is also notable for the musicians' use of a vegetable oil powered bus.

In the summer of 2009, Dan Deacon went on tour with two other notable acts, Deerhunter, and No Age, on the "No Deachunter" tour.

In the fall of 2009, Dan Deacon was forced to cancel the small remainder of his North American tour, which included shows at Rensselaer Polytechnic Institute in Troy, New York and Connecticut College in New London, Connecticut due to health complications involving a battle with acute sciatica, all of which were rescheduled in winter of 2010.

For his America tour, Deacon created a smartphone app that synchronizes with the live show. It is usually used during the song "True Thrush".

=== Digital video ===
Deacon recorded the track "Drinking Out of Cups". In 2006, Liam Lynch created a video to accompany the piece. The compilation has been viewed more than 20 million times on YouTube. As the video spread, rumors of what the video was and how it was made quickly began forming. One popular rumor is that it is a recording of someone on LSD locked in a closet. Deacon has stated numerous times that this is not true.

He collaborated with Wham City Comedy, on Live Forever as You Are Now with Alan Resnick, an infomercial parody, created for Adult Swim and "Showbeast" the web series created and directed by Ben O'Brien.

=== Film composer and curator ===
In September 2010, Deacon collaborated with video artist Jimmy Joe Roche at the Incubate festival in Tilburg, The Netherlands. While in residency there, Deacon and Roche worked on a new piece of video art. Material was shot at 't Schop, a farm in Hilvarenbeek, and in the area surrounding Tilburg. During the festival, the movie was shown at the farm before Deacon's performance.

Together with Jimmy Joe Roche and film critic Eric Allen Hatch, Dan Deacon curated and hosted the Gunky's Basement Film Series, a Maryland Film Festival series of films that are favorites of these friends and collaborators, including RoboCop, The Shining, and Something Wild.

Deacon's score for Theo Anthony's 2017 documentary Rat Film was issued on October 13, 2017, as the inaugural release on the new Domino Soundtracks imprint. During the recording of the score, Deacon experimented with the rodent subjects, placing rats onto a custom fiberglass table with sensors on each corner. "I thought it would be interesting to set up a group of theremins to be controlled by rats moving around an enclosure (the volumes and pitches would always be fluctuating based on where/how the rats moved)", he explained in a statement. "Using the data and patterns collected from the rat Theremin performance, as well as impulse data from recordings of rat brain activity, I began to compose the bulk of the score."

Deacon appears as himself in the 2014 film Song One.

In November 2018, Deacon released Time Trial, his original soundtrack score to Finlay Pretsell's cycling documentary. Deacon's scores for both Rat Film and Time Trial were nominated for Best Original Score in the annual Cinema Eye Honors.

Other films scored by Deacon include the feature documentaries Well Groomed and And We Go Green, and the ESPN 30 for 30 short Subject to Review. Deacon also contributed original music to the score of Francis Ford Coppola's 2011 horror film Twixt, starring Val Kilmer.

Deacon scored three projects that premiered at the 2021 Sundance Film Festival: Albert Birney and Kentucker Audley's narrative feature Strawberry Mansion, Theo Anthony's documentary feature All Light, Everywhere, and the documentary series Philly D.A.

In 2021, Deacon also scored Jessica Kingdon's feature documentary Ascension, which premiered at the 2021 Tribeca Film Festival, winning both Best Documentary Feature and the Albert Maysles Award for Best New Documentary Director.

Deacon's scores for Ascension and All Light, Everywhere were both nominated for Outstanding Original Score at the 2022 Cinema Eye Honors, with Ascension taking home the prize in that category.

With his recent work on Hustle, Venom: The Last Dance and Rez Ball, Deacon has shifted focus from scoring independent documentary films to feature-length narrative films for wider audiences. As of 2025, Venom: The Last Dance is the highest grossing film he has scored.

== Discography ==
=== Solo studio records ===
- Spiderman of the Rings (Wildfire Wildfire / Carpark Records, 2007)
- Bromst (Carpark Records, 2009)
- America (Domino, 2012)
- Gliss Riffer (Domino, 2015)
- Mystic Familiar (Domino, 2020)

=== Extended plays & singles ===
- Green Cobra Is Awesome vs. the Sun (single, 2003)
- Porky Pig (Standard Oil Records New Music Series, 2004)
- Twacky Cats (Comfort Stand Records, 2004)
- Acorn Master (Psych-o-Path Records, 2006)
- The Crystal Cat (7" single, Carpark Records, 2007)
- Dan Deacon/Adventure Split (12" single, Carpark Records, 2009)
- Woof Woof (single, 2009)

=== As producer ===
- Ed Schrader's Music Beat, Riddles (Carpark Records, 2018)

=== Other releases ===
- Meetle Mice (2003)
- Silly Hat vs. Egale Hat (2003)
- Goose on the Loose (2003)
- Live Recordings 2003 (2004)
- Ultimate Reality (soundtrack) (Carpark Records, 2008)
- Twixt (soundtrack) (with Osvaldo Golijov, 2011)
- I Said No Doctors! (Dymaxion Groove, 2017)
- Rat Film (Original Soundtrack) (Domino Soundtracks, 2017)
- Time Trial (Original Soundtrack) (Domino Soundtracks, 2018)
- Well Groomed (Original Soundtrack) (Domino Soundtracks, 2020)
- Ascension (Original Soundtrack) (Milan Records, 2021)
- All Light, Everywhere (Original Soundtrack) (Milan Records, 2021)
- Strawberry Mansion (Original Soundtrack) (Milan Records, 2022)
- Hustle (Soundtrack from the Netflix Film) (Netflix Music, 2022)

=== Collaborations ===
Year	Artist	Release	Notes
2016	Matmos	Ultimate Care II	MIDI programming
2018	Field Works	Initial Sounds	co-performer, song "Potentially Lahars"
2018	Ed Schrader's Music Beat	Riddles	programming and synths
2019	Chaunter	Dream Dynamics	arrangements, song "Goodbye"
2021	Future Islands	"For Sure (Dan Deacon Remix)"	Remixer

== Film scores ==
Title	Year	Director	Notes
Ultimate Reality	2007	Jimmy Joe Roche	Experimental video-art piece
Hilvarenbeek	2010	Dan Deacon and Jimmy Joe Roche	Experimental narrative short film
Twixt (with Osvaldo Golijov)	2011	Francis Ford Coppola	Feature film
Unedited Footage of a Bear	2014	Alan Resnick and Ben O'Brien	Short film
Rat Film	2016	Theo Anthony	Experimental documentary feature film
Growing Girl	2017	Marnie Ellen Hertzler	Documentary short film
Time Trial	2017	Finlay Pretsell	Documentary feature film
Hi I Need to Be Loved	2018	Marnie Ellen Hertzler	Documentary short film
Well Groomed	2019	Rebecca Stern	Documentary feature film
Skin of Man	2019	Jimmy Joe Roche	Short film
And We Go Green	2019	Fisher Stevens and Malcolm Venville	Documentary feature film
Subject to Review	2019	Theo Anthony	Documentary short film for ESPN 30 for 30
Strawberry Mansion	2021	Albert Birney and Kentucker Audley	Narrative feature film
All Light, Everywhere	2021	Theo Anthony	Experimental documentary feature film
Ascension	2021	Jessica Kingdon	Documentary feature film
Hustle	2022	Jeremiah Zagar	Feature film
Venom: The Last Dance	2024	Kelly Marcel	Feature film
Rez Ball	2024	Sydney Freeland	Feature film
André Is an Idiot	2025	Tony Benna	Documentary feature film
Time and Water	2026	Sara Dosa	Documentary feature film
Chili Finger	2026	Edd Benda and Stephen Helstad	Feature film

== Television scores ==
Title	Year	Network
Philly D.A.	2021	PBS Independent Lens
Wedding Season	2022	Star on Disney+
Sex Diaries	2022	HBO
The Changeling	2023	Apple TV+
Perfect Wife: The Mysterious Disappearance of Sherri Papini	2024	Hulu
Task	2025	HBO
The Price of Milk	2025	

== Charts ==
- August 1, 2006: Acorn Master hits #162 on the CMJ Radio 200 charts.
- March 24, 2009: Bromst hits #199 on the Billboard Top 200 charts.
- September 15, 2012: America hits #147 on the Billboard Top 200 charts, and #5 on Top Dance/Electronic Albums charts
- March 14, 2015: Gliss Riffer hits #2 on the Billboard Top Dance/Electronic Albums charts

== Awards ==
- Silly Hat vs. Egale Hat #18 in Top 30 most played albums on WFMU in November 2003
- Meetle Mice Third Best Album of 2003 on Top Ten Albums by OCDJ
- Best Solo Performer 2005 Baltimore City Paper Critics Poll
- Best Solo Performer 2006 Baltimore City Paper Readers Poll
- Acorn Master #1 in Top 30 played albums on WFMU in July 2006
- Spiderman of the Rings named Best New Music on Pitchfork in May 2007 with an 8.7 rating
- "Wham City" was listed #30 on Pitchfork's "Top 100 Tracks of 2007"
- Awarded "Best Awesome" by COOL! magazine
- Spiderman of the Rings named one of the best records of 2007 by CMJ New Music Monthly
- "The Crystal Cat" Single listed in top 100 singles of 2007 by Rolling Stone magazine
- Spiderman of the Rings named one of the 25 best records of 2007 by Pitchfork
- Bromst named Best New Music on Pitchfork in March 2009 with an 8.5 rating
- Performance with So Percussion at the Merkin Concert Hall as part of the Ecstatic Music Festival named one of the top 10 classical music performances of 2011 by New York magazine
- Gliss Riffer named Best Album of 2015 by Baltimore City Paper
- Rat Film (Original Soundtrack) nominated for Best Original score in the 2018 Cinema Eye Honors
- Spiderman of the Rings / Ultimate Reality 10th anniversary show named Best Concert of 2018 by WTMD (89.7 FM)
- BSO Pulse performance with the Baltimore Symphony Orchestra named Best Concert of 2019 by Baltimore magazine
- Time Trial (Original Soundtrack) nominated for Best Original score in the 2019 Cinema Eye Honors
- Ascension (Original Soundtrack) wins top award Outstanding Original Score in the 2022 Cinema Eye Honors
- All Light, Everywhere (Original Soundtrack) nominated for Outstanding Original Score in the 2022 Cinema Eye Honors
