= 37th Independent Spirit Awards =

US film awards ceremony in 2022

- Awarded for: Best in independent film and independent television
- Date: March 6, 2022
- Site: Santa Monica Pier; Santa Monica, California, U.S.
- Hosted by: Megan Mullally; Nick Offerman

Highlights
- Best Feature: The Lost Daughter
- Most awards: Film: The Lost Daughter (3); TV: Reservation Dogs (2)
- Most nominations: Film: Zola (7); TV: Blindspotting / It's a Sin / Reservation Dogs / Rutherford Falls / Them: Covenant / The Underground Railroad / We Are Lady Parts (2)

Television coverage
- Channel: IFC

The 37th Film Independent Spirit Awards, honoring the best independent films and television series of 2021, were presented by Film Independent on March 6, 2022. Traditionally held the Saturday before the Academy Awards, the 2022 date marks a shift in the season, placing the Spirit Awards squarely in the corridor leading into Oscar voting. The nominations were announced on December 14, 2021, by actresses Beanie Feldstein, Regina Hall, and Naomi Watts. Returning to an in-person ceremony this year, the event was televised in the United States on IFC and streamed exclusively for subscribers by AMC+. Married couple Megan Mullally and Nick Offerman hosted the ceremony.

The grant recipients for the Emerging Filmmakers Awards were announced on February 10, 2022.

== Winners and nominees ==
=== Film ===
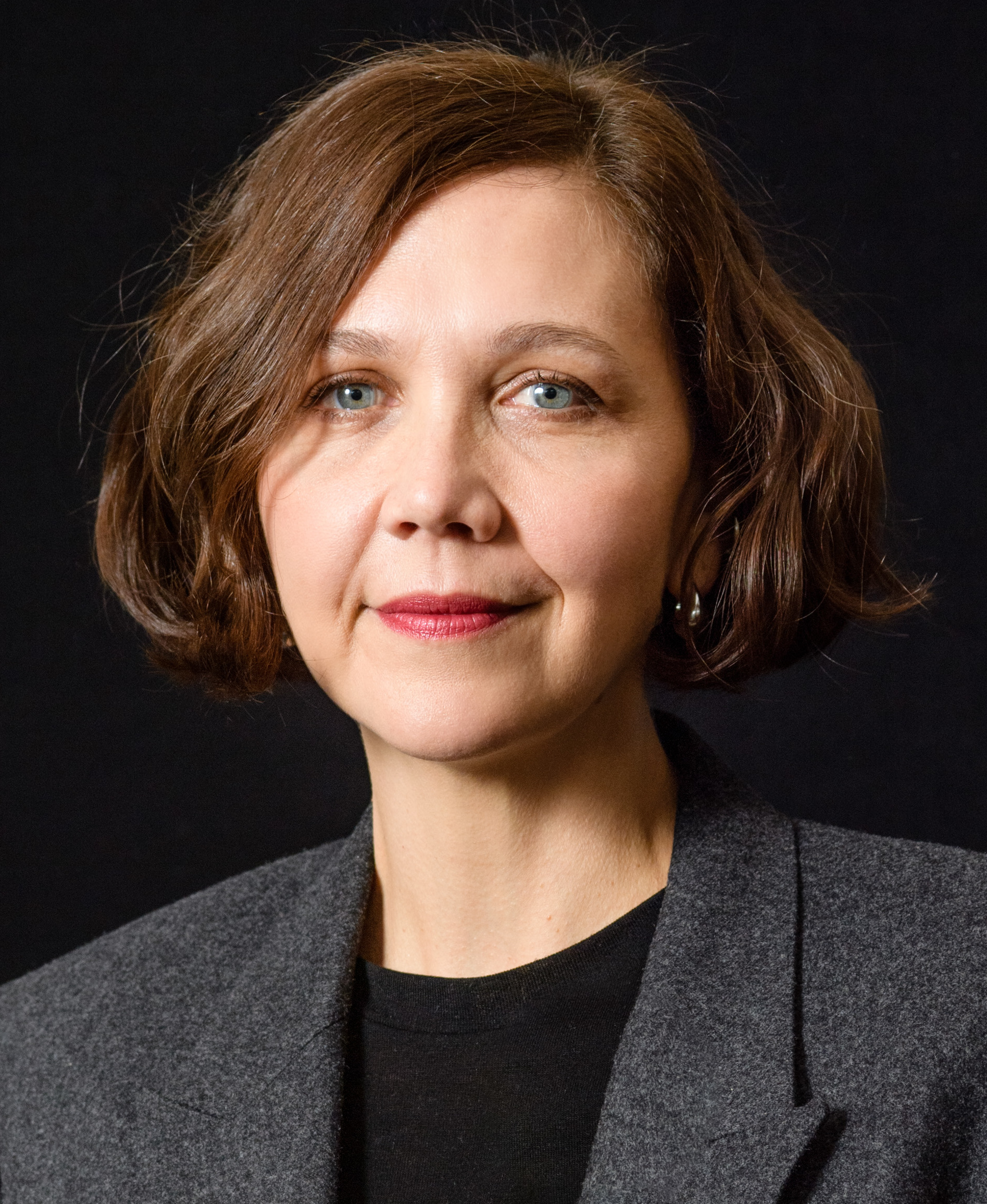
Maggie Gyllenhaal, Best Feature co-winner, and Best Director and Best Screenplay winner

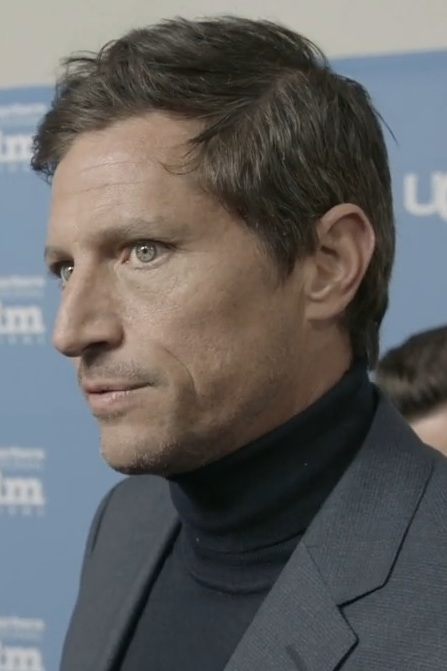
Simon Rex, Best Male Lead winner

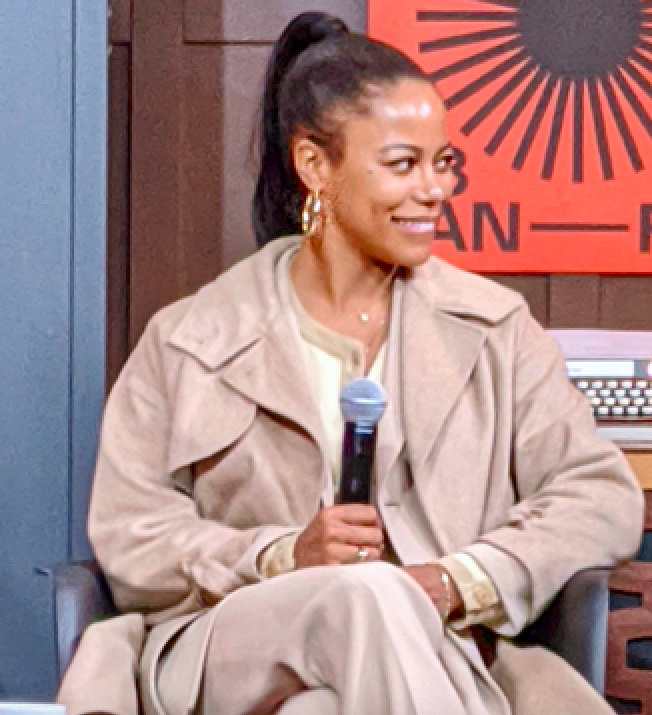
Taylour Paige, Best Female Lead winner

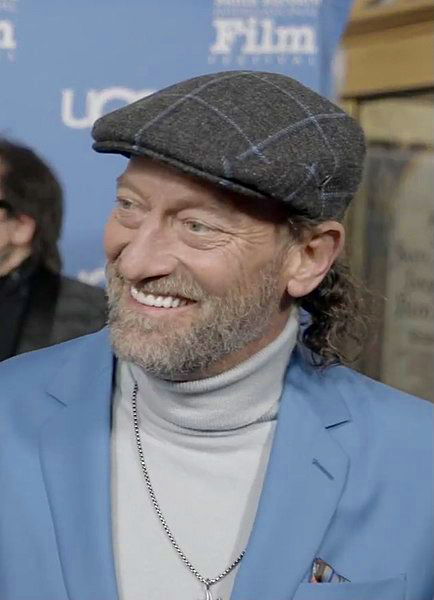
Troy Kotsur, Best Supporting Male winner

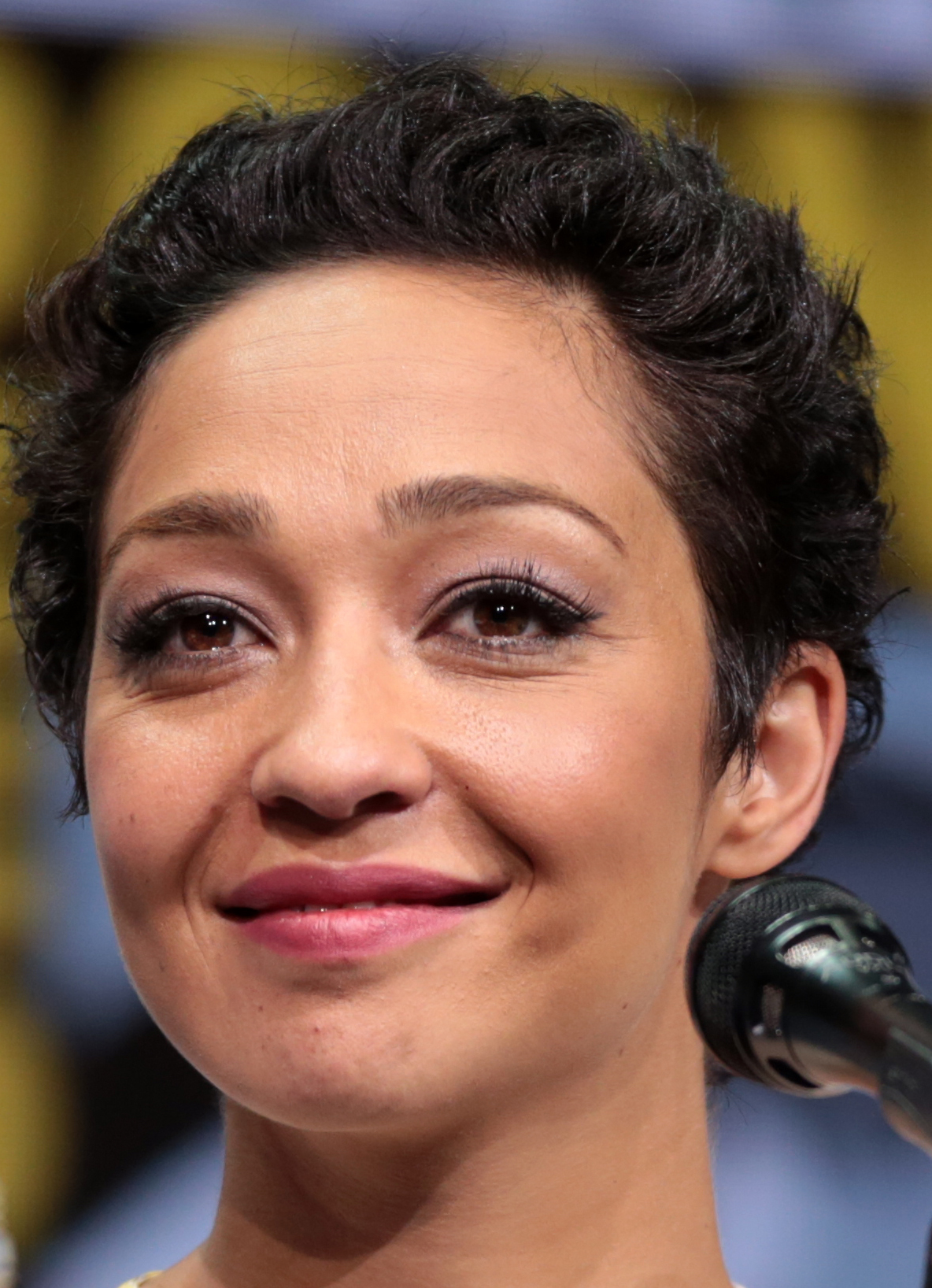
Ruth Negga, Best Supporting Female winner

Best Feature	Best Director
The Lost Daughter: A Chiara; C'mon C'mon; The Novice; Zola	Maggie Gyllenhaal – The Lost Daughter: Janicza Bravo – Zola; Lauren Hadaway – The Novice; Mike Mills – C'mon C'mon; Ninja Thyberg – Pleasure
Best Male Lead	Best Female Lead
Simon Rex – Red Rocket as Mikey Saber: Clifton Collins Jr. – Jockey as Jackson Silva; Frankie Faison – The Killing of Kenneth Chamberlain as Kenneth Chamberlain Sr.; Michael Greyeyes – Wild Indian as Makwa; Udo Kier – Swan Song as Pat Pitsenbarger	Taylour Paige – Zola as Aziah "Zola" King: Isabelle Fuhrman – The Novice as Alex Dall; Brittany S. Hall – Test Pattern as Renesha Bell; Patti Harrison – Together Together as Anna; Kali Reis – Catch the Fair One as Kaylee "K.O." Uppashaw
Best Supporting Male	Best Supporting Female
Troy Kotsur – CODA as Frank Rossi: Colman Domingo – Zola as Abegunde "X" Olawale; Meeko Gattuso – Queen of Glory as Pitt; Will Patton – Sweet Thing as Adam; Chaske Spencer – Wild Indian as Teddo	Ruth Negga – Passing as Clare Bellew: Jessie Buckley – The Lost Daughter as Young Leda Caruso; Amy Forsyth – The Novice as Jamie Brill; Revika Reustle – Pleasure as Joy; Suzanna Son – Red Rocket as Strawberry
Best Screenplay	Best First Screenplay
Maggie Gyllenhaal – The Lost Daughter: Nikole Beckwith – Together Together; Janicza Bravo and Jeremy O. Harris – Zola; Mike Mills – C'mon C'mon; Todd Stephens – Swan Song	Michael Sarnoski and Vanessa Block – Pig: Sheldon D. Brown and Matthew Fifer – Cicada; Lyle Mitchell Corbine Jr. – Wild Indian; Shatara Michelle Ford – Test Pattern; Fran Kranz – Mass
Best First Feature	Best Documentary Feature
7 Days: Holler; Queen of Glory; Test Pattern; Wild Indian	Summer of Soul (...Or, When the Revolution Could Not Be Televised): Ascension; Flee; In the Same Breath; Procession
Best Cinematography	Best Editing
Eduard Grau – Passing: Ante Cheng and Matthew Chuang – Blue Bayou; Lol Crawley – The Humans; Tim Curtin – A Chiara; Ari Wegner – Zola	Joi McMillon – Zola: Affonso Gonçalves – A Chiara; Ali Greer – The Nowhere Inn; Lauren Hadaway and Nathan Nugent – The Novice; Enrico Natale – The Killing of Kenneth Chamberlain
Best International Film
Drive My Car (Japan): Compartment No. 6 (Estonia / Finland / Germany / Russia); Parallel Mothers (Spain); Pebbles (India); Petite Maman (France); Prayers for the Stolen (Mexico)

==== Films with multiple nominations and awards ====
Films that received multiple nominations
Nominations	Film
7	Zola
5	The Novice
4	The Lost Daughter
4	Test Pattern
4	Wild Indian
3	A Chiara
3	C'mon C'mon
2	Jockey
2	The Killing of Kenneth Chamberlain
2	Passing
2	Pig
2	Pleasure
2	Queen of Glory
2	Red Rocket
2	Shiva Baby
2	Swan Song
2	Sweet Thing
2	Together Together

Films that won multiple awards
Awards	Film
3	The Lost Daughter
2	Passing
2	Shiva Baby
2	Zola

=== Television ===
Best New Scripted Series	Best New Non-Scripted or Documentary Series
Reservation Dogs (FX on Hulu): Blindspotting (Starz); It's a Sin (Channel 4); The Underground Railroad (Prime Video); We Are Lady Parts (Channel 4)	Black and Missing (HBO): The Choe Show (FX); The Lady and the Dale (HBO); Nuclear Family (HBO); Philly D.A. (PBS)
Best Male Performance in a New Scripted Series	Best Female Performance in a New Scripted Series
Lee Jung-jae – Squid Game as Seong Gi-hun (Netflix): Olly Alexander – It's a Sin as Ritchie Tozer (Channel 4); Murray Bartlett – The White Lotus as Armond (HBO); Michael Greyeyes – Rutherford Falls as Terry Thomas (Peacock); Ashley Thomas – Them: Covenant as Henry Emory (Prime Video)	Thuso Mbedu – The Underground Railroad as Cora Randall (Prime Video): Deborah Ayorinde – Them: Covenant as Livia "Lucky" Emory (Prime Video); Jasmine Cephas Jones – Blindspotting as Ashley Rose (Starz); Jana Schmieding – Rutherford Falls as Reagan Wells (Peacock); Anjana Vasan – We Are Lady Parts as Amina (Channel 4)
Best Ensemble Cast in a New Scripted Series
Reservation Dogs – Paulina Alexis, Funny Bone, Lane Factor, Devery Jacobs, Zahn McClarnon, Lil Mike, Sarah Podemski, and D'Pharaoh Woon-A-Tai

==== Series with multiple nominations and awards ====
Series that received multiple nominations
Nominations	Series
2	Blindspotting
2	It's a Sin
2	Reservation Dogs
2	Rutherford Falls
2	Them: Covenant
2	The Underground Railroad
2	We Are Lady Parts

Series that won multiple awards
Awards	Series
2	Reservation Dogs

== Special awards ==
=== John Cassavetes Award ===
(The award is given to the best feature made for under $500,000; the award is given to the writer, director, and producer)

Shiva Baby

- Cryptozoo
- Jockey
- Sweet Thing
- This Is Not a War Story

=== Robert Altman Award ===
(The award is given to one film's director, casting director, and ensemble cast)

- Mass – Fran Kranz (director), Henry Russell Bergstein (casting director), Allison Estrin (casting director), Kagen Albright, Reed Birney, Michelle N. Carter, Ann Dowd, Jason Isaacs, Martha Plimpton, and Breeda Wool

== Emerging Filmmakers Awards ==
=== Producers Award ===
The award honors emerging producers who, despite highly limited resources, demonstrate the creativity, tenacity, and vision required to produce quality, independent films. The award includes a $25,000 unrestricted grant.

- Lizzie Shapiro – Shiva Baby
  - Brad Becker-Parton – Italian Studies
  - Pin-Chun Liu – Test Pattern

=== Someone to Watch Award ===
The award recognizes talented filmmakers of singular vision who have not yet received appropriate recognition. The award includes a $25,000 unrestricted grant.

- Alex Camilleri – Luzzu
  - Gillian Wallace Horvat – I Blame Society
  - Michael Sarnoski – Pig

=== Truer than Fiction Award ===
The award is presented to an emerging director of non-fiction features who has not yet received significant recognition. The award includes a $25,000 unrestricted grant.

- Jessica Beshir – Faya Dayi
  - Debbie Lum – Try Harder!
  - Angelo Madsen Minax – North by Current

== See also ==
- 94th Academy Awards
- 79th Golden Globe Awards
- 75th British Academy Film Awards
- 42nd Golden Raspberry Awards
- 28th Screen Actors Guild Awards
- 27th Critics' Choice Awards
