= 15th Cinema Eye Honors =

- Date: March 1, 2022
- Location: Museum of the Moving Image, Astoria, New York
- Website: cinemaeyehonors.com

The 15th Cinema Eye Honors recognized outstanding artistry and craft in nonfiction filmmaking of 2021 and took place at the Museum of the Moving Image in Astoria, New York on March 1, 2022. The ceremony was originally scheduled for January 13, 2022, but it was postponed due to COVID-19 pandemic-related concerns.

The nominations for the broadcast categories were announced on October 20, 2021. The complete list of nominations, including both broadcast and film, were announced on November 10, 2021.

== Winners and nominees ==
=== Feature film ===
Outstanding Non-Fiction Feature	Outstanding Direction
Flee – Directed by Jonas Poher Rasmussen; Produced by Monica Hellström and Signe Byrge Sørensen; Ascension – Directed and Produced by Jessica Kingdon; Produced by Kira Simon-Kennedy and Nathan Truesdell; Faya Dayi – Directed and Produced by Jessica Beshir; The Rescue – Directed and Produced by E. Chai Vasarhelyi and Jimmy Chin; Produced by P.J. van Sandwjik and John Battsek; Summer of Soul (...Or, When the Revolution Could Not Be Televised) – Directed by Ahmir "Questlove" Thompson; Produced by Joseph Patel, Robert Fyvolent, and David Dinerstein; The Velvet Underground – Directed and Produced by Todd Haynes; Produced by Christine Vachon, Julie Goldman, Christopher Clements, Carolyn Hepburn	Procession – Robert Greene; Ascension – Jessica Kingdon; Faya Dayi – Jessica Beshir; Flee – Jonas Poher Rasmussen; In the Same Breath – Nanfu Wang; Summer of Soul (...Or, When the Revolution Could Not Be Televised) – Ahmir "Questlove" Thompson
Outstanding Editing	Outstanding Production
Summer of Soul (...Or, When the Revolution Could Not Be Televised) – Joshua Pearson; Homeroom – Kristina Mohwani and Rebecca Adorno; The Rescue – Bob Eisenhardt; Roadrunner: A Film About Anthony Bourdain – Eileen Meyer and Aaron Wickenden; The Velvet Underground – Affonso Gonçalves and Adam Kurnitz	The First Wave – Matthew Heineman, Jenna Millman and Leslie Norville; Flee – Monica Hellström and Signe Byrge Sørensen; In the Same Breath – Nanfu Wang, Jialing Zhang, Julie Goldman, Christopher Clements and Carolyn Hepburm; President – Signe Byrge Sørensen and Joslyn Barnes; The Rescue – E. Chai Vasarhelyi, Jimmy Chin, P.J. van Sandwjik and John Battsek
Outstanding Cinematography	Outstanding Original Score
Ascension – Jessica Kingdon and Nathan Truesdell; All Light, Everywhere – Corey Hughes; Cusp – Isabel Bethencourt; Faya Dayi – Jessica Beshir; The Rescue – David Katznelson, Picha Srisansanee and Ian Seabrook	Ascension – Dan Deacon; All Light, Everywhere – Dan Deacon; Flee – Uno Helmersson; Julia – Rachel Portman; maini – towards the ocean, towards the shore – Thad Kellstadt; Procession – Keegan DeWitt
Outstanding Sound Design	Outstanding Graphic Design/Animation
The Velvet Underground – Leslie Shatz and Jahn Sood; All Light, Everywhere – Udit Duseja; Faya Dayi – Tom Efinger and Abigail Savage; Flee – Edward Björner and Tormod Ringnes; Summer of Soul (...Or, When the Revolution Could Not Be Televised) – Jimmy Douglass and Paul Hsu	Flee – Kenneth Ladekjær; Becoming Cousteau – Daniel Rutledge; Rebel Hearts – Una Lorenzen and Emma Berliner; The Sparks Brothers – Joseph Wallace; Wojnarowicz: F*ck You F*ggot F*cker – Grant Nellessen and Andrew Rose
Outstanding Debut	Outstanding Non-Fiction Short
Ascension – Directed by Jessica Kingdon; A Cop Movie – Directed by Alonso Ruizpalacios; Faya Dayi – Directed by Jessica Beshir; Jacinta – Directed by Jessica Earnshaw; Summer of Soul (..Or, When the Revolution Could Not Be Televised) – Directed by Ahmir "Questlove" Thompson	Three Songs for Benazir – Directed by Elizabeth Mirzaei and Gulistan Mirzaei; Águilas – Directed by Kristy Guevara-Flanagan and Maite Zubiaurre; A Broken House – Directed by Jimmy Goldblum; Don’t Go Tellin' Your Momma – Directed by Topaz Jones and rubberband; Terror Contagion – Directed by Laura Poitras
Spotlight Award	Heterodox Award
North by Current – Directed by Angelo Madsen Minax; Fruits of Labor – Directed by Emily Cohen Ibañez; The Neutral Ground – Directed by CJ Hunt; Socks on Fire – Directed by Bo McGuire; Two Gods – Directed by Zeshawn Ali	El Planeta – Directed by Amalia Ulman; Bo Burnham: Inside – Directed by Bo Burnham; A Cop Movie – Directed by Alonso Ruizpalacios; The Inheritance – Directed by Ephraim Asili; The Souvenir Part II – Directed by Joanna Hogg
Audience Choice Prize	The Unforgettables
The Rescue – Directed by E. Chai Vasarhelyi and Jimmy Chin; Becoming Cousteau – Directed by Liz Garbus; Billie Eilish: The World's a Little Blurry – Directed by R. J. Cutler; Flee – Directed by Jonas Poher Rasmussen; Homeroom – Directed by Peter Nicks; Julia – Directed by Julie Cohen and Betsy West; Lily Topples the World – Directed by Jeremy Workman; Listening to Kenny G – Directed by Penny Lane; Rita Moreno: Just a Girl Who Decided to Go for It – Directed by Mariem Pérez Riera; Roadrunner: A Film About Anthony Bourdain – Directed by Morgan Neville; The Sparks Brothers – Directed by Edgar Wright; Summer of Soul (Or, When the Revolution Could Not Be Televised) – Directed by Ahmir "Questlove" Thompson; Try Harder! – Directed by Debbie Lum; The Velvet Underground – Directed by Todd Haynes; Writing with Fire – Directed by Rintu Thomas and Sushmit Ghosh	Flee – Amin; Homeroom – Denilson Garibo; Introducing, Selma Blair – Selma Blair; Jacinta – Jacinta Hunt; Lily Topples the World – Lily Hevesh; Listening to Kenny G – Kenny G; Mr. Bachmann and His Class – Mr. Bachmann; My Name is Pauli Murray – Pauli Murray; Not Going Quietly – Ady Barkan; Procession – Joe Eldred, Mike Foreman, Ed Gavagan, Dan Laurine, Michael Sandridge, & Tom Viviano; The Rescue – Rick Stanton; Rita Moreno: Just a Girl Who Decided to Go for It – Rita Moreno; Roadrunner: A Film About Anthony Bourdain – Anthony Bourdain; The Sparks Brothers – Ron Mael and Russell Mael; Writing with Fire – Meera Nevi

=== Broadcast ===
Outstanding Broadcast Film	Outstanding Nonfiction Series
In the Same Breath – Directed by Nanfu Wang (HBO); All In: The Fight for Democracy – Directed by Liz Garbus and Lisa Cortés (Prime Video); David Byrne's American Utopia – Directed by Spike Lee (HBO); Disclosure – Directed by Sam Feder (Netflix); Tina – Directed by Dan Lindsay and T. J. Martin (HBO)	City So Real – Directed by Steve James (National Geographic); 1971: The Year that Music Changed Everything – Directed by Asif Kapadia, Danielle Peck and James Rogan (Apple TV+); Exterminate All the Brutes – Directed by Raoul Peck (HBO); The Lady and the Dale – Directed by Zackary Drucker and Nick Cammilleri (HBO); Last Chance U: Basketball – Directed by Greg Whiteley, Adam Leibowitz and Daniel George McDonald (Netflix); Philly D.A. – Directed by Yoni Brook, Ted Passon and Nicole Salazar (Independent Lens/PBS)
Outstanding Anthology Series	Shorts List Film
Pretend It's a City – Martin Scorsese, Fran Liebowitz, David Tedeschi, Ted Griffin, Emma Tillinger Koskoff, Joshua Porter and Margaret Bodde, Executive Producers (Netflix); Earth at Night in Color – Alex Williamson, Executive Producer (Apple TV+); Generation Hustle – Angie Day and Yon Motskin, Executive Producers (HBO Max); High on the Hog: How African American Cuisine Transformed America – Fabienne Toback, Karis Jagger and Roger Ross Williams, Executive Producers (Netflix); How To with John Wilson – Nathan Fielder, Michael Koman, Clark Reinking and John Wilson, Executive Producers (HBO); Taste the Nation with Padma Lakshmi – Padma Lakshmi, David Shadrack Smith and Sarina Roma, Executive Producers (Hulu)	Elena – Directed by Michèle Stephenson; Jobs for All! – Directed by Axel Danielson & Maximilien Van Aertryck; The Last Cruise – Directed by Hannah Olson; Takeover – Directed by Emma Francis-Snyder; We Were There to Be There – Directed by Mike Plante and Jason Willis; Your Street – Directed by Güzin Kar
Outstanding Broadcast Editing	Outstanding Broadcast Cinematography
How To with John Wilson – Adam Locke-Norton (HBO); Allen v. Farrow – Mikaela Shwer, Parker Laramie and Sara Newens (HBO); City So Real – David E. Simpson and Steve James (National Geographic); David Byrne's American Utopia – Adam Gough (HBO); Exterminate All the Brutes – Directed by Alexandra Strauss (HBO)	David Byrne's American Utopia – Ellen Kuras (HBO); 100 Foot Wave – Nominees to be determined (HBO); City So Real – Jackson James and Steve James (National Geographic); Earth at Night in Color – Nominees to be determined (Apple TV+); High on the Hog: How African American Cuisine Transformed America – Jerry Henry (Netflix)

=== Legacy Award ===
- The Watermelon Woman – Written and directed by Cheryl Dunye; Produced by Alexandra Juhasz and Barry Swimar; Edited by Annie Taylor; Cinematography by Michelle Crenshaw; Original Score by Paul Shapiro
