= Gotham Independent Film Awards 2021 =

American film awards

31st Annual Gotham Independent Film Awards
- Date: November 29, 2021
- Country: United States
- Presented by: The Gotham Film & Media Institute

Highlights
- Most wins: The Lost Daughter (4)
- Most nominations: The Lost Daughter and Passing (5)
- Best Feature: The Lost Daughter
- Breakthrough Director: Maggie Gyllenhaal – The Lost Daughter
- Website: Gotham Awards

The 31st Annual Gotham Awards, presented by the Gotham Film & Media Institute (previously Independent Filmmaker Project), were held on November 29, 2021. The nominees were announced on October 21, 2021. Actors Peter Dinklage and Kristen Stewart, director Jane Campion, film executive Eamonn Bowles, playwright Kathleen Collins, and the cast of The Harder They Fall all received tribute awards. Collins received her tribute award posthumously.

== Ceremony information ==
Starting with this ceremony, the awards for Best Actor and Best Actress were replaced by two new, gender neutral award categories: Outstanding Lead Performance and Outstanding Supporting Performance. Furthermore, a gender neutral award category for acting in a series, called Outstanding Performance in a New Series, was added. These three new categories each have up to ten nominees instead of the usual five. In addition to these changes to the acting categories, an award for Breakthrough Nonfiction Series was created for this ceremony.

== Winners and nominees ==
=== Film ===
Best Feature: The Lost Daughter; The Green Knight; Passing; Pig; Test Pattern	Best Screenplay: The Lost Daughter – Maggie Gyllenhaal; The Card Counter – Paul Schrader; El Planeta – Amalia Ulman; The Green Knight – David Lowery; Passing – Rebecca Hall; Red Rocket – Sean Baker and Chris Bergoch
Best Documentary Feature: Flee; Ascension; Faya Dayi; President; Summer of Soul (...Or, When the Revolution Could Not Be Televised)	Best International Feature: Drive My Car; Azor; The Souvenir Part II; Titane; What Do We See When We Look at the Sky?; The Worst Person in the World
Breakthrough Director: Maggie Gyllenhaal – The Lost Daughter; Edson Oda – Nine Days; Rebecca Hall – Passing; Emma Seligman – Shiva Baby; Shatara Michelle Ford – Test Pattern	Breakthrough Performer: Emilia Jones – CODA as Ruby Rossi; Natalie Morales – Language Lessons as Cariño; Rachel Sennott – Shiva Baby as Danielle; Suzanna Son – Red Rocket as Strawberry; Amalia Ulman – El Planeta as Leonor Jimenez
Outstanding Lead Performance: Olivia Colman – The Lost Daughter as Leda Caruso (TIE); Frankie Faison – The Killing of Kenneth Chamberlain as Kenneth Chamberlain Sr. (TIE); Michael Greyeyes – Wild Indian as Makwa; Brittany S. Hall – Test Pattern as Renesha; Oscar Isaac – The Card Counter as William "Tell" Tillich; Taylour Paige – Zola as Aziah "Zola" King; Joaquin Phoenix – C'mon C'mon as Johnny; Simon Rex – Red Rocket as Mikey Saber; Lili Taylor – Paper Spiders as Dawn; Tessa Thompson as Irene "Reenie" Redfield – Passing	Outstanding Supporting Performance: Troy Kotsur – CODA as Frank Rossi; Reed Birney – Mass as Richard; Jessie Buckley – The Lost Daughter as Young Leda Caruso; Colman Domingo – Zola as Abegunde "X" Olawale; Gaby Hoffmann – C'mon C'mon as Viv; Marlee Matlin – CODA as Jackie Rossi; Ruth Negga – Passing as Clare Bellew

=== Television ===
Breakthrough Series – Long Form: Squid Game; The Good Lord Bird; It's a Sin; Small Axe; The Underground Railroad; The White Lotus	Breakthrough Series – Short Form: Reservation Dogs; Blindspotting; Hacks; Run the World; We Are Lady Parts
Breakthrough Nonfiction Series: Philly D.A.; City So Real; Exterminate All the Brutes; How To with John Wilson; Pride	Outstanding Performance in a New Series: Ethan Hawke – The Good Lord Bird as John Brown (TIE); Thuso Mbedu – The Underground Railroad as Cora Randall (TIE); Jennifer Coolidge – The White Lotus as Tanya McQuoid; Michael Greyeyes – Rutherford Falls as Terry Thomas; Devery Jacobs – Reservation Dogs as Elora Danan Postoak; Lee Jung-jae – Squid Game as Seong Gi-hun; Jean Smart – Hacks as Deborah Vance; Omar Sy – Lupin as Assane Diop; Anya Taylor-Joy – The Queen’s Gambit as Beth Harmon; Anjana Vasan – We Are Lady Parts as Amina

== Special awards ==
=== Director's Tribute ===
- Jane Campion

=== Ensemble Tribute ===
- The Harder They Fall – Zazie Beetz, Deon Cole, RJ Cyler, Danielle Deadwyler, Idris Elba, Edi Gathegi, Regina King, Delroy Lindo, Jonathan Majors, Lakeith Stanfield and Damon Wayans Jr.

=== Icon Tribute ===
- Kathleen Collins (posthumously)

=== Impact Salute ===
- Actors Fund of America

=== Industry Tribute ===
- Eamonn Bowles

=== Performer Tribute ===
- Peter Dinklage
- Kristen Stewart
