= Mark E. Kingdon =

American financier

- Born: Brooklyn, New York
- Education: Columbia University (BA); Harvard University (MBA)
- Occupation: hedge fund manager
- Known for: founding Kingdon Capital Management
- Children: 2, including Jessica Kingdon

Mark E. Kingdon is a hedge fund manager and president of Kingdon Capital Management, a US investment management company with approximately $623 million in assets under management.

== Biography ==
Kingdon was born in Brooklyn and grew up on Long Island. He graduated from Columbia College in 1971 and Harvard Business School in 1973. Kingdon began his career with AT&T as a pension fund administrator from 1973 to 1975. In 1975, he joined Century Capital Associates, where he remained for eight years. In 1983, he founded Kingdon Capital management with $2 million that grew into a $5.9 billion hedge fund as of 2007 and was listed among Financial Times' "100 hedge funds to watch." Between 1983 and 2000, his fund has maintained a compounded annual return of 22.99 percent.

Kingdon is a Trustee Emeritus, a member of the board of Investment Management Company, co-chair of the Global Leadership Council and a member of the President’s Council on World Projects at Columbia University.

Kingdon also served on the Columbia College Board of Visitors as well as the Board of Trustees of Columbia University.

== Philanthropy ==
Some of Kingdon's philanthropic endeavors include donating funds to groups that help to support impoverished children such as Harlem Children's Zone and groups that help promote Chinese culture such as the China Institute. He endowed the C. Lowell Harriss Professorship of Economics at Columbia University in honor of his mentor, and the position is currently being held by economist and vice chairman of the Federal Reserve, Richard Clarida. He also served as a trustee of Carnegie Hall. Kingdon currently sits on the boards of Harlem Children's Zone, the New York City Police Foundation and New York City Center and is a member of the Dean’s Advisory Board of Harvard Business School.

== Awards ==
In 2003, Kingdon received the Institutional Investor/Alternative Investment News Lifetime Achievement Award. In 2005, Kingdon received Columbia College's John Jay Award for distinguished professional achievement as well as the Alexander Hamilton Award, the highest honor that Columbia College bestows upon its alumni.

== Personal life and family ==
Kingdon is married to Anla Cheng, a senior partner of private equity firm Sino-Century who also founded the New York-based news platform, SupChina. Cheng was also a senior investment banker with Robert Fleming & Co. His daughter, Jessica Kingdon, is an Academy Award-nominated director and producer known for her 2021 documentary, Ascension.
