= List of killings by law enforcement officers in the United States, November 2011 =

This is a list of people reported killed by non-military law enforcement officers in the United States in November 2011, whether in the line of duty or not, and regardless of reason or method. The listing documents the occurrence of a death, making no implications regarding wrongdoing or justification on the part of the person killed or officer involved. Killings are arranged by date of the incident that caused death. Different death dates, if known, are noted in the description. The table below lists 20 people.

== November 2011 ==
Date	Name (Age) of Deceased	State (city)	Description
2011-11-29	Michael Curtis (46)	Maine (Dover-Foxcroft)	
2011-11-28	Hines, Carulus	Georgia (Atlanta)	Shot while stabbing her own four-year-old daughter to death and refusing commands to put down a knife. Police were responding to a report of abuse of Hines' son.
2011-11-28	Buckner, Adam (39)	Arizona (Chandler)	
2011-11-27	Welling, Austin	Washington (Tacoma)	18-year-old Welling was shot and critically injured after an officer pulled him over on suspicion of driving a stolen vehicle. Welling allegedly put the car in reverse and drove toward the officer, who fired at him several times. The 18-year-old was taken off of life support on January 31, 2012.
2011-11-26	Unnamed man (28)	California (Los Angeles)	
2011-11-25	Ramirez, Pablo Perez (25)	California (Sebastopol)	Shot and killed by a Sebastopol Police Department officer after pulling a revolver from his waistband. Police came to Ramirez's ex-girlfriend's apartment complex in response to a domestic disturbance. Ramirez took out a revolver and police fired three shots at Ramirez, from 10 to 15 feet away.
2011-11-24	Donteau Napier (27)	Pennsylvania (Farrell)	
2011-11-22	Hernandez, Reynaldo Cabrera (52)	Florida (Hialeah)	
2011-11-21	Pate, Bernard (37)	Nevada(Las Vegas)	Shot and killed while running from and pointing a gun at an officer. Officers approached Pate because they suspected he was a gang member and began pursuing him when he ran from them.
2011-11-17	Person, Dwight	Georgia (East Point)	Shot after making a threatening gesture at police. Officers were conducting a "knock and announce" search warrant, looking for drugs.
2011-11-19	Chamberlain Sr., Kenneth	New York (White Plains)	Shot in his home by police responding to an automated medical alert.
2011-11-19	Crowley-Smilek, Justin	Maine (Farmington)	Shot in police parking lot when the man came at the officer with a knife.
2011-11-13	Crahay, Holly	Washington (SeaTac)	Shot after shooting at police. Officers were attempting to stop Crahay for reckless driving. Crahay led officers on chase who performed PIT maneuver causing Crahay's vehicle to spin to a stop at which point she began shooting.
2011-11-13	Unnamed man (35)	Wisconsin (Green Bay)	
2011-11-13	Shante Alford (34)	Wisconsin (Milwaukee)	
2011-11-12	Anderson, Jamar (24)	Florida (Royal Palm Beach)	
2011-11-12	James Coleman (22)	Maryland (District Heights)	
2011-11-12	Bergstrasser, Sean	Washington (Colville)	Shot without further details released. A stolen handgun was recovered at scene. Police were responding to a report of a "vehicle prowling".
2011-11-10	Moore, Glen Edward	Georgia (Macon)	Shot after aiming gun at police. Police were responding to report of a screaming nude man banging on doors and windows of residences. Before police arrived Moore kicked the door of one home and shot a man to death. Moore was standing over the body of his victim when he pointed the gun at police.
2011-11-05	Elderts, Kollin	Hawaii (Waikiki)	Kollin Elderts was shot in a McDonald's restaurant by an off-duty State Department special agent, Christopher Deedy. Elderts was shot during a confrontation between him and Deedy after Deedy intervened when Elderts and another man had been accosting customers. Elderts did not have any weapon in his possession during the confrontation but was drunk and on drugs at the time of the incident. Deedy was charged with second-degree murder and acquitted in 2014. The killing and ensuing trial are discussed in a ten-episode season of Off Shore Podcast, a podcast run by Honolulu Civil Beat and PRX.

== See also ==
- Death in custody § United States
- Henry A. Wallace Police Crime Public Database
- List of cases of police brutality
- List of countries with annual rates and counts for killings by law enforcement officers
- List of law enforcement officers killed in the line of duty in the United States
- List of law enforcement officers convicted for an on-duty killing in the United States
- List of shootings by US immigration agents
- List of police reforms related to the George Floyd protests
- List of unarmed African Americans killed by law enforcement officers in the United States
- Lists of killings by law enforcement officers
- Police brutality in the United States
- Police misconduct § United States
- Police riot § United States
- Police use of deadly force in the United States
