= We Cry Together =

2022 song by Kendrick Lamar and Taylour Paige

Song by Kendrick Lamar and Taylour Paige

from the album Mr. Morale & the Big Steppers
- Released: May 13, 2022
- Recorded: 2019–2020
- Studio: IGA and Windmark (Santa Monica)
- Genre: Jazz rap; spoken word
- Length: 5:41
- Label: PGLang; TDE; Aftermath; Interscope
- Songwriters: Kendrick Duckworth; Alan Maman; Daniel Tannenbaum; Jason Pounds; Florence Welch; Gary Peacock
- Producers: The Alchemist; Bekon; J.Lbs

"We Cry Together" is a song by American rapper Kendrick Lamar and American actress Taylour Paige, taken from the former's fifth studio album, Mr. Morale & the Big Steppers, released on May 13, 2022. The eighth track on the album, Lamar wrote the song alongside the Alchemist, Bekon, and J.Lbs. Florence Welch and Gary Peacock received additional songwriting credits for the sampling of their respective songs "June" and "Valentine".

A jazz rap and spoken word song, "We Cry Together" portrays Lamar and Paige as an emotionally abusive couple in the midst of a heated argument that ultimately ends with sexual reconciliation. Media outlets have pointed out that the song's concept shares similarities with Eminem's 2000 song "Kim", which sees the fellow rapper engaged in a violent argument with his then-wife.

The song was praised as a standout track from Mr. Morale & the Big Steppers. MEL Magazine noted its "harrowing" intensity and realistic depictions of domestic violence. Following the release of its parent album, "We Cry Together" debuted at number 16 on the Billboard Hot 100. A short film based on the song was released worldwide on September 1, 2022.

== Background and release ==
The introduction for "We Cry Together" was first teased on March 5, 2020, in the visual mission statement for American rapper Kendrick Lamar's creative collective PGLang. It was released alongside his fifth studio Mr. Morale & the Big Steppers on May 13, 2022, as a duet with American actress Taylour Paige. Lamar wrote the song alongside the Alchemist, Bekon, and J.Lbs, who produced the track with Emile Haynie. The song contains samples of "June" written by Florence Welch and performed by Florence and the Machine, and "Valentine" written by Gary Peacock and performed by Peacock, Art Lande and Eliot Zigmund.

"We Cry Together" features additional narration from Lamar's longtime partner Whitney Alford. It was recorded at IGA Studios and Windmark Recording in Santa Monica, California by Ray Charles Brown Jr., Johnathan Turner, James Blunt and Matt Schaeffer, with assistance from Logan Haynes, Andrew Boyd and Tristan Bott. Derek "MixedByAli" Ali and Cyrus "NOIS" Taghipour mixed it at No Name Studios in Tarzana, with assistance from Curtis "Sircut" Bye and Brandon Blatz. Emerson Mancini mastered it at Larrabee Studios in North Hollywood.

Lamar's longtime collaborator, Sounwave, revealed in an interview with GQ that "We Cry Together" was one of the earliest songs recorded for Mr. Morale & the Big Steppers. In 2019, after holding onto the initial beats for a while, Lamar showed him a "scratch idea of a couple arguing. He didn’t have all the words down—he just had the male’s verse and then mumbles of the lady’s part. I come in one day and he had pitched his voice up to sound like a girl and he was literally arguing with himself." Amazed at the demo, Sounwave asked him if they should "drop it like this with just your voice?" Lamar answered, "Nah, we’ve gotta find someone who can actually nail this moment.” After a long process of finding someone who "can give this kind of emotion but also act it out the way that it’s supposed to feel", Lamar's creative partner Dave Free suggested Paige, which made them all "lit up". The song was recorded almost in one take with Lamar and Paige in February 2020. Sounwave disclosed that it was "one of the songs that we knew was staying" on the album.

== Composition and lyrics ==
"We Cry Together" is a "polarizing" jazz rap and spoken word song with stripped-down pianos and drums played in a loop. It is set in the key of B-flat minor with its lyrics, a representation of "what the world sounds like" according to Alford, follows an emotionally abusive couple, played by Lamar and Paige, in the middle of an intense argument. Throughout the song, the duo argue and spew insults at each other non-stop over their toxic relationship, the patriarchy, politics, feminism, and gender roles. The song ends with Paige demanding Lamar to reconcile with her over sex, to which he agrees while they still argue. Tap dancing can be heard in the background of the ending, before Alford urges them to "stop tap dancing around the conversation".

== Critical reception ==
Steven Loftin of The Line of Best Fit described the "traumatic and heartbreaking" song as "wonderfully elaborate and horrifyingly real, so much so it feels like a moment you shouldn’t be privy too, as if your neighbors are having a roaring argument through the paper thin walls." Stephen Kearse of Pitchfork was impressed by the blow of insults present in the "noxious melodrama", writing that they felt "almost improvised despite being tightly rhymed and metered. Eminem can finally retire happy." Jon Caramanica of The New York Times applauded the song's "startlingly raw toxicity, even if construed as character work" and calls it "one of the most musically successful songs on the album, a shuddering alignment of rhythm and sentiment."

Several critics named "We Cry Together" as a highlight on Mr. Morale & the Big Steppers. Ben Bryant of The Independent chose it as "the most ruthless track" on the album. Miloslaw Archibald Rugallini of Sputnikmusic lauded over how the song "creatively implements cadence to balance immersion in the drama, utilizes humor to break the tension of an ugly confrontation, has the characters swap venomous one-liners while sharing flows, and ends with them about to get their fuck on. This track is the goods, and anyone who tells you otherwise is a gaslighting fool who needs the Blu Cantrell treatment stat." He suggests Alford's closing line acts as an "observation of the nature of most quarrels (that their root cause is often ignored in the exchange of ad hominem and finger-pointing) and signposts the confrontation of self that Kendrick actually fucking has in the second half of the album." Will Pritchard of The Daily Telegraph, however, criticized her closing line as the album's "most egregious" example of its "occasional blip." In a more mixed review, Jeff Ihaza of Rolling Stone writes that Lamar "misfires a not entirely bad concept. It is indeed naïve to ignore the complicated dynamics of attraction, love, and violence, but so too is proffering them with too much meaning."

== Commercial performance ==
Following the release of Mr. Morale & the Big Steppers, "We Cry Together" debuted at number 16 on the Billboard Hot 100 chart alongside the album's 18 songs. In its second week of charting, the song descended a record-setting 81 spots to number 97, marking the biggest single-week drop in Hot 100 history for a song that remained on the chart.

== Personnel ==
Credits adapted from the album's liner notes.

- Kendrick Lamar – lead vocals, songwriting
- Taylour Paige – lead vocals
- The Alchemist – songwriting, production
- Bekon – songwriting, production
- J.Lbs – songwriting, production
- Florence Welch – songwriting
- Gary Peacock – songwriting
- Emile Haynie – production
- Ray Charles Brown Jr. – recording engineer
- Johnathan Turner – recording engineer
- James Blunt – recording engineer
- Matt Schaeffer – recording engineer
- Logan Haynes – recording assistance
- Andrew Boyd – recording assistance
- Tristan Bott – recording assistance
- Derek Ali – mixing
- Cyrus Taghipour – mixing
- Curtis Bye – mixing assistance
- Brandon Blatz – mixing assistance
- Emerson Mancini – mastering

== Charts ==
Chart performance for "We Cry Together"
Chart (2022)	Peak position
Australia (ARIA)	19
Canada Hot 100 (Billboard)	22
Global 200 (Billboard)	20
South Africa Streaming (TOSAC)	4
Sweden (Sverigetopplistan)	96
US Billboard Hot 100	16
US Hot R&B/Hip-Hop Songs (Billboard)	11
US Hot Rap Songs (Billboard)	9
