= Kira Simon-Kennedy =

Documentary film producer

Kira Simon-Kennedy is a documentary film producer. She was nominated for an Academy Award in the category Best Documentary Feature for the film Ascension.

== Selected filmography ==
- Ascension (2021; co-nominated with Jessica Kingdon and Nathan Truesdell)
