= Gotham Independent Film Award for Outstanding Lead Performance =

Annual US film award

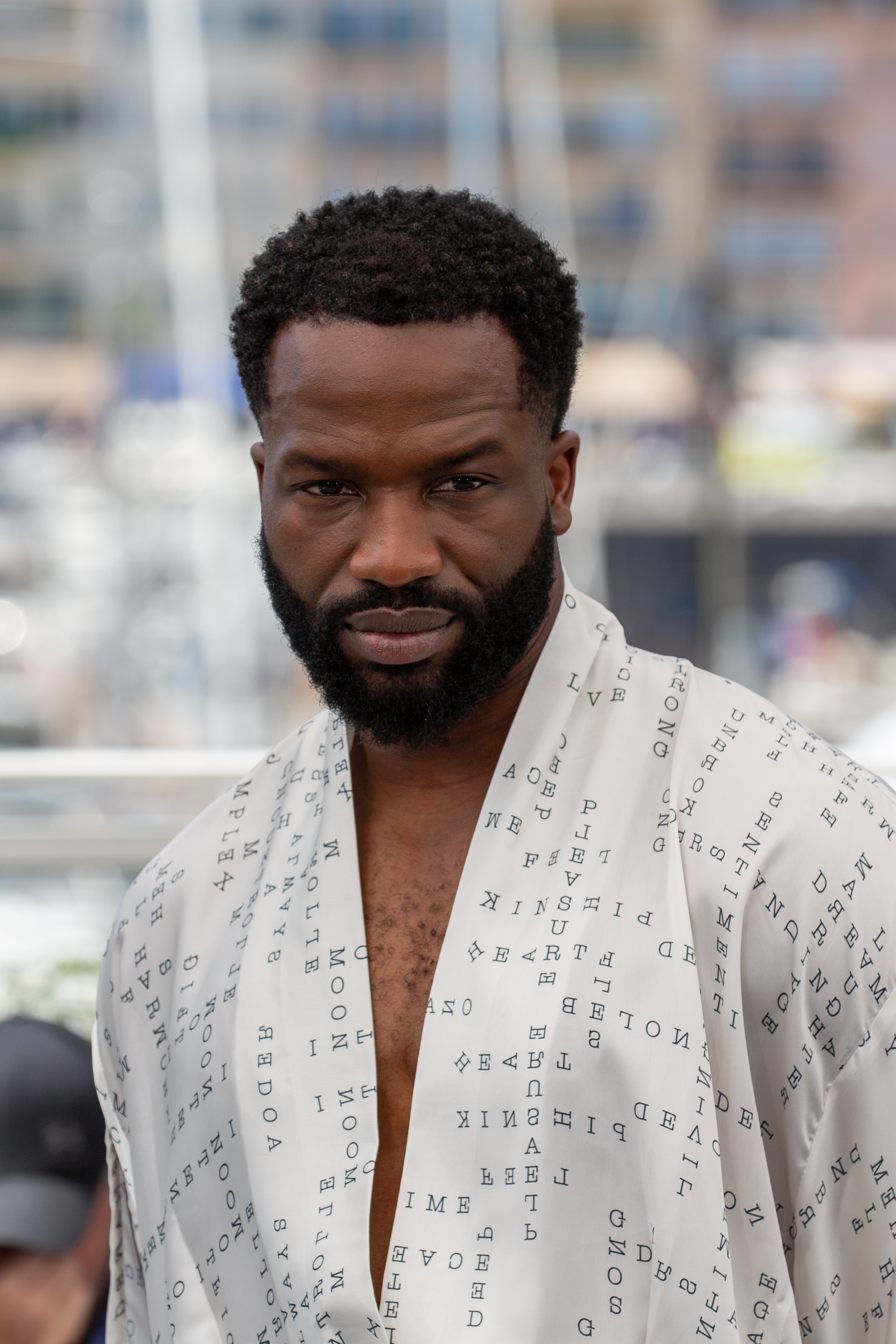
- 2025 recipient: Ṣọpẹ́ Dìrísù
- Country: United States
- Presented by: The Gotham Film & Media Institute
- First award: 2021
- Currently held by: Ṣọpẹ́ Dìrísù for My Father's Shadow (2025)
- Website: awards.thegotham.org

The Gotham Independent Film Award for Outstanding Lead Performance is one of the annual Gotham Independent Film Awards and was first awarded in 2021.

It is a gender neutral award and was introduced for the Gotham Independent Film Awards 2021 to replace the awards for Best Actor and Best Actress given out in previous years.

== Winners and nominees ==
=== 2020s ===
Year	Winner and nominees	Film	Role	Ref.
2021	Olivia Colman	The Lost Daughter	Leda Caruso	
2021	Frankie Faison	The Killing of Kenneth Chamberlain	Kenneth Chamberlain Sr.	
2021	Michael Greyeyes	Wild Indian	Makwa	
2021	Brittany S. Hall	Test Pattern	Renesha	
2021	Oscar Isaac	The Card Counter	William "Tell" Tillich	
2021	Taylour Paige	Zola	Aziah "Zola" King	
2021	Joaquin Phoenix	C'mon C'mon	Johnny	
2021	Simon Rex	Red Rocket	Mikey Saber	
2021	Lili Taylor	Paper Spiders	Dawn	
2021	Tessa Thompson	Passing	Irene "Reenie" Redfield	
2022	Danielle Deadwyler	Till	Mamie Till-Mobley	
2022	Cate Blanchett	Tár	Lydia Tár	
2022	Dale Dickey	A Love Song	Faye	
2022	Colin Farrell	After Yang	Jake	
2022	Brendan Fraser	The Whale	Charlie	
2022	Paul Mescal	Aftersun	Calum	
2022	Thandiwe Newton	God's Country	Sandra Guidry	
2022	Aubrey Plaza	Emily the Criminal	Emily Benetto	
2022	Taylor Russell	Bones and All	Maren Yearly	
2022	Michelle Yeoh	Everything Everywhere All At Once	Evelyn Wang	
2023	Lily Gladstone	The Unknown Country	Tana	
2023	Aunjanue Ellis-Taylor	Origin	Isabel Wilkerson	
2023	Greta Lee	Past Lives	Nora	
2023	Franz Rogowski	Passages	Tomas	
2023	Babetida Sadjo	Our Father, the Devil	Marie Cissé	
2023	Andrew Scott	All of Us Strangers	Adam	
2023	Cailee Spaeny	Priscilla	Priscilla Presley	
2023	Teyana Taylor	A Thousand and One	Inez de la Paz	
2023	Michelle Williams	Showing Up	Lizzy	
2023	Jeffrey Wright	American Fiction	Thelonious "Monk" Ellison	
2024	Colman Domingo	Sing Sing	John "Divine G" Whitfield	
2024	Pamela Anderson	The Last Showgirl	Shelley	
2024	Adrien Brody	The Brutalist	László Tóth	
2024	Marianne Jean-Baptiste	Hard Truths	Pansy	
2024	Nicole Kidman	Babygirl	Romy Mathis	
2024	Keith Kupferer	Ghostlight	Dan Mueller	
2024	Mikey Madison	Anora	Anora "Ani" Mikheeva	
2024	Demi Moore	The Substance	Elisabeth Sparkle	
2024	Saoirse Ronan	The Outrun	Rona	
2024	Justice Smith	I Saw the TV Glow	Owen	
2025	Ṣọpẹ́ Dìrísù	My Father's Shadow	Folarin	
2025	Jessie Buckley	Hamnet	Agnes Shakespeare	
2025	Lee Byung-hun	No Other Choice	Yoo Man-soo	
2025	Rose Byrne	If I Had Legs I'd Kick You	Linda	
2025	Ethan Hawke	Blue Moon	Lorenz Hart	
2025	Jennifer Lawrence	Die My Love	Grace	
2025	Wagner Moura	The Secret Agent	Armando / Marcelo Alves / Adult Fernando	
2025	Josh O'Connor	The Mastermind	James Blaine "J.B." Mooney	
2025	Amanda Seyfried	The Testament of Ann Lee	Ann Lee	
2025	Tessa Thompson	Hedda	Hedda Gabler	
2026	Mahershala Ali	Your Mother Your Mother Your Mother	Latif	
2026	Gillian Anderson	Teenage Sex and Death at Camp Miasma	Billy Presley	
2026	Jeon Do-yeon	Possible Love	Mi-ok	
2026	John Early	Maddie's Secret	Maddie Ralph	
2026	John Malkovich	Wild Horse Nine	Chris Carlisle	
2026	Ian McKellen	The Christophers	Julian Sklar	
2026	Julianne Moore	The Debut	Mona Friedman	
2026	Sophie Okonedo	Clarissa	Clarissa Dalloway	
2026	Andrew Scott	Elsinore	Ian Charleson	
2026	John Turturro	The Only Living Pickpocket in New York	Harry Lehman	

== Multiple wins and nominations ==
Individuals receiving multiple nominations:

Nominations	Performer
2	Andrew Scott
2	Tessa Thompson

== See also ==
- Independent Spirit Award for Best Male Lead
- Independent Spirit Award for Best Female Lead
