= Philly D.A. =

2021 American documentary series

- Genre: Documentary
- Directed by: Ted Passon; Yoni Brook; Nicola Salazar
- Music by: Dan Deacon
- Country of origin: United States
- Original language: English
- No. of episodes: 8

Production
- Executive producers: Dawn Porter; Patty Quillin; Sally Jo Fifer; Lois Vossen; Ryan Chanatry; Gena Konstantinakos; Jeff Seelbach
- Producers: Ted Passon; Yoni Brook; Nicole Salazar; Josh Penn; Michael Gottwald
- Cinematography: Yoni Brook
- Editors: Dita Gruze; Adriana Pacheco; Rubin Daniels Jr.; Hemal Trivedi; Jim Hession
- Running time: 55-58 minutes
- Production companies: ITVS; Corporation for Public Broadcasting; All Ages Productions; Department of Motion Pictures; Topic; JustFilms/Ford Foundation

Original release
- Network: PBS
- Release: April 20 – June 1, 2021

Philly D.A. is a 2021 American documentary series revolving around progressive Philadelphia, Pennsylvania, district attorney Larry Krasner. It consists of 8-episodes and premiered on PBS through Independent Lens on April 20, 2021.

== Synopsis ==
The eight episode docuseries series follows Larry Krasner, a progressive district attorney in Philadelphia, Pennsylvania, through his election and first term.

== Episodes ==
No.	Title	Directed by	Original release date	U.S. viewers (millions)
1	"You're the Man Now"	Ted Passon; Yoni Brook	April 20, 2021	N/A
2	"Damaged Goods"	Ted Passon; Yoni Brook	April 20, 2021	N/A
3	"This is a Capital Case!"	Ted Passon; Yoni Brook	April 27, 2021	N/A
4	"Scarlet Letter F"	Ted Passon; Yoni Brook; Nicole Salazar	May 4, 2021	N/A
5	"Second Chances"	Ted Passon; Yoni Brook	May 11, 2021	N/A
6	"Enemies of Civilization"	Ted Passon; Yoni Brook	May 18, 2021	N/A
7	"You Prosecute Cops"	Ted Passon; Yoni Brook; Nicole Salazar	May 25, 2021	N/A
8	"Are We Winning?"	Ted Passon; Yoni Brook	June 1, 2021	N/A

== Release ==
The series had its world premiere at the Sundance Film Festival on February 2, 2021, with the first two episodes of the series. It also screened at the Berlin International Film Festival on March 2, 2021. PBS began airing the series on April 20, 2021, on Independent Lens. Topic released the series on July 1, 2021.

== Reception ==
=== Critical reception ===
On Rotten Tomatoes, the series holds an approval rating of 92% based on 21 reviews

Kathryn VanArendok of Vulture said that "Philly D.A. is the second coming of The Wire, in docuseries form… It’s compelling… it’s gripping… engrossing, and heartbreaking… The show should be viewed as a model for an entire genre of documentary storytelling. I’m totally mesmerized by this series, I could not stop watching it." Matt Brennan of the Los Angeles Times said Philly D.A. is "the best TV show I've seen all year" while Ben Travers of Indiewire said "I’m relatively sure it’s the best documentary series of 2021. It’s certainly the most illuminating, enthralling, and impressive..." Andy Dehnart of Reality Blurred called it "easily the best docuseries of 2021… cameras are present for some riveting moments, as if this were a masterfully scripted HBO drama… a rare and exceptional documentary reality series." Fionnuala Halligan of Screen Daily wrote, "Riveting...a must see."

Time magazine, Los Angeles Times, and Vulture included Philly D.A. on their lists of the "Best TV Shows of 2021".

=== Accolades ===
Award	Date of ceremony	Category	Recipient(s)	Result	Ref.
Cinema Eye Honors	March 1, 2022	Outstanding Nonfiction Series	Philly D.A.	Nominated	
Gotham Awards	November 29, 2021	Breakthrough Nonfiction Series	Philly D.A.	Won	
IDA Documentary Awards	March 4, 2022	Best Multi-Part Documentary	Ted Passon, Yoni Brook, Nicole Salazar, Josh Penn, Michael Gottwald, Dawn Porter, Sally Jo Fifer, Lois Vossen, Nion McEvoy, Patty Quillin, Jeff Seelbach, Ryan Chanatry, and Gena Konstantinakos	Nominated	
Independent Spirit Awards	March 6, 2022	Best New Non-Scripted or Documentary Series	Philly D.A.	Nominated	
Peabody Awards	June 6–9, 2022	Documentary	Philly D.A.	Won	
