= City So Real =

American documentary miniseries

- Genre: Documentary
- Directed by: Steve James
- Music by: Will Miller; Resavoir
- Country of origin: United States
- Original language: English

Production
- Executive producers: Jeffrey Skoll; Diane Weyermann; Alex Kotlowitz; Gordon Quinn; Betsy Steinberg; Jolene Pinder
- Producers: Zak Piper; Steve James
- Cinematography: Jackson James; Steve James
- Editors: David E. Simpson; Steve James
- Production companies: Participant; Kartemquin Films

Original release
- Network: National Geographic
- Release: October 29, 2020

City So Real is an American documentary miniseries directed by Steve James, revolving around the 2019 mayoral election in Chicago, Illinois, and the impact of the COVID-19 pandemic and social upheaval following the murder of George Floyd. It consists of 5 episodes and premiered on October 29, 2020, on National Geographic.

== Premise ==
The series follows the 2019 mayoral election in Chicago, exploring corruption within the city, the impact of the COVID-19 pandemic, and social upheaval following the murder of George Floyd.

== Episodes ==
No.	Title	Directed by	Original release date	U.S. viewers (millions)
1	"Welcome to Chicago"	Steve James	October 29, 2020	N/A
2	"Blood Sport"	Steve James	October 29, 2020	N/A
3	"With All Due Respect to the Candidate"	Steve James	October 29, 2020	N/A
4	"If You Want to Break the Machine"	Steve James	October 29, 2020	N/A
5	"You Gotta Make It or You Gotta Take It"	Steve James	October 29, 2020	N/A

== Release ==
The series, originally just four episodes, had its world premiere at the Sundance Film Festival on January 27, 2020. In August 2020, National Geographic acquired distribution rights to the series.

== Reception ==
On Rotten Tomatoes, the series holds an approval rating of 100% based on 13 reviews, with an average rating of 9.38/10. On Metacritic, the series has a weighted average score of 93 out of 100, based on 14 critics, indicating "universal acclaim".

== Accolades ==
Year	Award	Category	Recipient(s)	Result	Ref.
2021	Gotham Awards	Breakthrough Nonfiction Series	City So Real	Nominated	
2021	IDA Documentary Awards	Best Multi-Part Documentary	Steve James, Zak Piper, Jeff Skoll, Diane Weyermann, Alex Kotlowitz, Gordon Quinn, Betsy Steinberg, and Jolene Pinder	Nominated	
2021	Independent Spirit Awards	Best New Non-Scripted or Documentary Series	City So Real	Nominated	
2021	Primetime Creative Arts Emmy Awards	Outstanding Documentary or Nonfiction Series	Diane Weyermann, Alex Kotlowitz, Gordon Quinn, Jolene Pinder, Steve James, and Zak Piper	Nominated	
2021	Primetime Creative Arts Emmy Awards	Outstanding Cinematography for a Nonfiction Program	Jackson James and Steve James ("Blood Sport")	Nominated	
2021	TCA Awards	Outstanding Achievement in News and Information	City So Real	Nominated	
2022	Cinema Eye Honors	Outstanding Nonfiction Series	City So Real	Won	
2022	Cinema Eye Honors	Outstanding Broadcast Editing	David E. Simpson and Steve James	Nominated	
2022	Cinema Eye Honors	Outstanding Broadcast Cinematography	Jackson James and Steve James	Nominated	
