= Gotham Independent Film Award for Breakthrough Nonfiction Series =

Nonfiction television award

Gotham TV Award for Breakthrough Nonfiction Series
- Country: United States
- Presented by: The Gotham Film & Media Institute
- First award: 2021
- Currently held by: Social Studies (2025)
- Website: tvawards.thegotham.org

The Gotham TV Award for Breakthrough Nonfiction Series is one of the annual Gotham TV Awards and was first awarded in 2021. Originally given out at the main Gotham Awards, it was announced in April 2024 that the award would be presented as part of the 1st Gotham TV Awards, effectively reintroducing it as one of the Gotham TV Awards after the category had not been presented at the previous main Gotham Awards ceremony.

== Winners and nominees ==
=== 2020s ===
Year	Program	Creator(s)	Network(s)	Ref.
2021	Philly D.A.	Ted Passon, Yoni Brook, and Nicole Salazar	PBS	
2021	City So Real	Steve James	Nat Geo	
2021	Exterminate All the Brutes	Raoul Peck	HBO / HBO Max	
2021	How To with John Wilson	John Wilson	HBO / HBO Max	
2021	Pride	–	FX	
2022	We Need to Talk About Cosby	W. Kamau Bell	Showtime	
2022	The Andy Warhol Diaries	Andrew Rossi	Netflix	
2022	The Last Movie Stars	Emily Wachtel	CNN Films / HBO Max	
2022	Mind Over Murder	Nanfu Wang	HBO / HBO Max	
2022	The Rehearsal	Nathan Fielder	HBO Max	
2023	Not awarded			
2024	Jerrod Carmichael Reality Show	Jerrod Carmichael	HBO / Max	
2024	Black Twitter: A People's History	Joie Jacoby	Hulu	
2024	Life on Our Planet	–	Netflix	
2024	Murder in Boston: Roots, Rampage, and Reckoning	Jason Hehir	HBO / Max	
2024	Stax: Soulsville U.S.A.	Jamila Wignot	HBO / Max	
2025	Social Studies	Lauren Greenfield	FX / Hulu	
2025	Conbody vs Everybody	Debra Granik	Self-distributed	
2025	Hollywood Black	Justin Simien	MGM+	
2025	Omnivore	Cary Joji Fukunaga, Matt Goulding, René Redzepi	Apple TV+	
2025	Ren Faire	–	HBO / Max	
