= Taylour Paige =

American actress (born 1990)

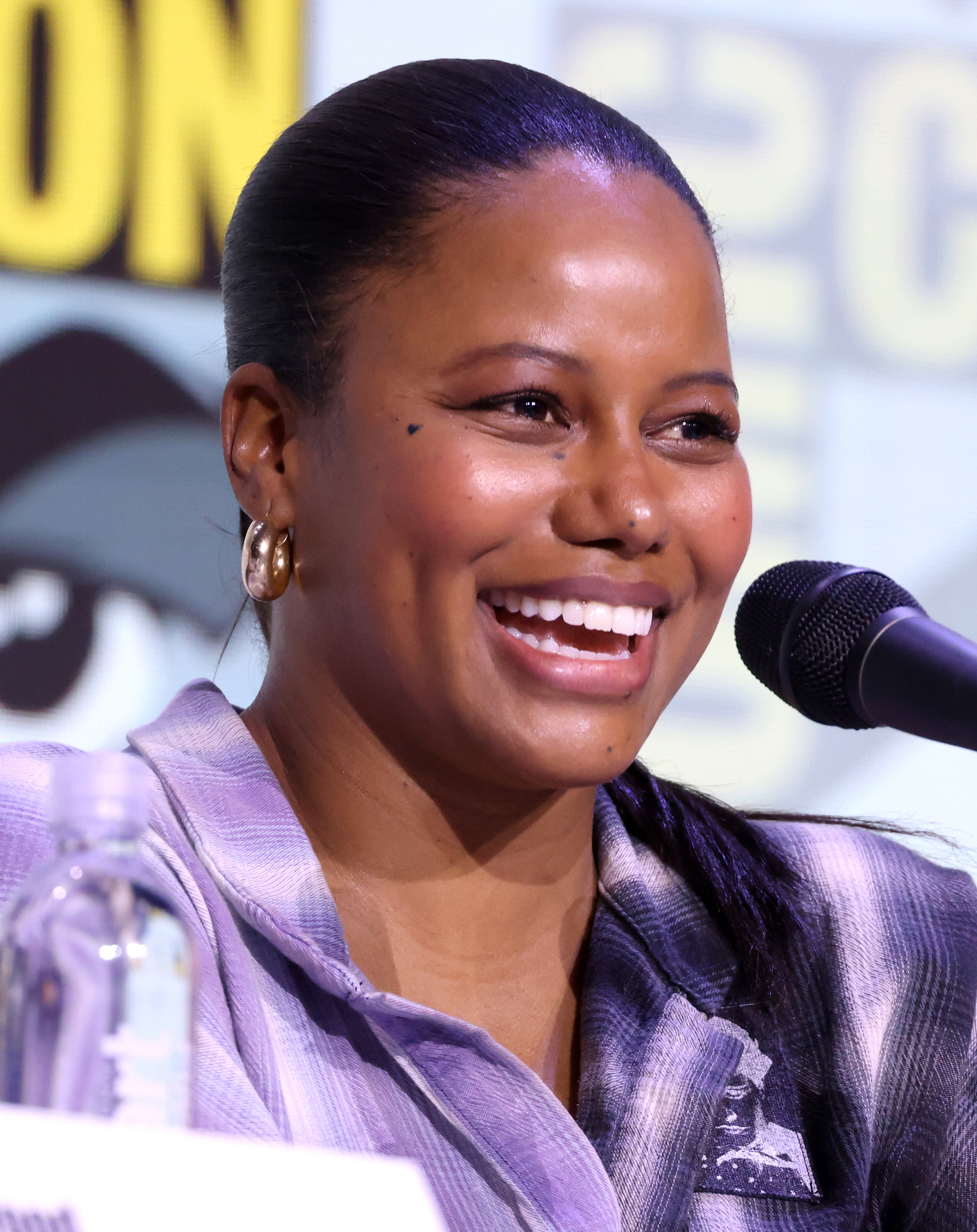
- Paige at the 2025 San Diego Comic-Con
- Born: October 5, 1990 (age 36); Santa Monica, California, U.S.
- Education: Loyola Marymount University
- Occupation: Actress
- Years active: 2008–present
- Spouse: Gary "Rivington Starchild" Angulo (m. 2022)
- Children: 1

Taylour Paige-Angulo (née Paige; born October 5, 1990) is an American actress. She received recognition for starring in the VH1 sports drama series Hit the Floor (2013–2016) and the comedy drama film Jean of the Joneses (2016). Her breakthrough role was the titular lead in the black comedy crime film Zola (2020), winning the Independent Spirit Award for Best Female Lead. She then starred in the drama film Ma Rainey's Black Bottom (2020) and the comedy drama film Beverly Hills Cop: Axel F (2024). She also gained further recognition for playing Charlotte Hanlon in the HBO series It: Welcome to Derry.

Though not a musician, in 2022, Paige featured on Kendrick Lamar's spoken word song "We Cry Together", which debuted at number 16 on the Billboard Hot 100 and netted Paige a Grammy Award nomination.

== Early life and education ==
Taylour Paige was born on October 5, 1990, in Santa Monica, California to Reginald Paige and Cheryl Williams. She grew up in Inglewood, California, a suburb of Los Angeles, with her older brother Travis. Paige began dancing at the age of 2 and trained at Katnap in Venice, Westside Ballet Academy, and later spent two consecutive summers at the Kirov Academy of Ballet in Washington, DC. In 2001, she became a student of choreographer Debbie Allen, and auditioned for her musical Pearl.

Paige attended St. Bernard Catholic High School in Playa del Rey, graduating in 2008.

She became a Los Angeles Laker Girl in 2010 and spent three months with the professional cheerleading squad before leaving to finish college and pursue her acting career. As a Laker Girl, she was featured in a special by Fox Sports on the making of the 2011 Laker Girls Calendar.

She is a graduate of Loyola Marymount University.

== Career ==
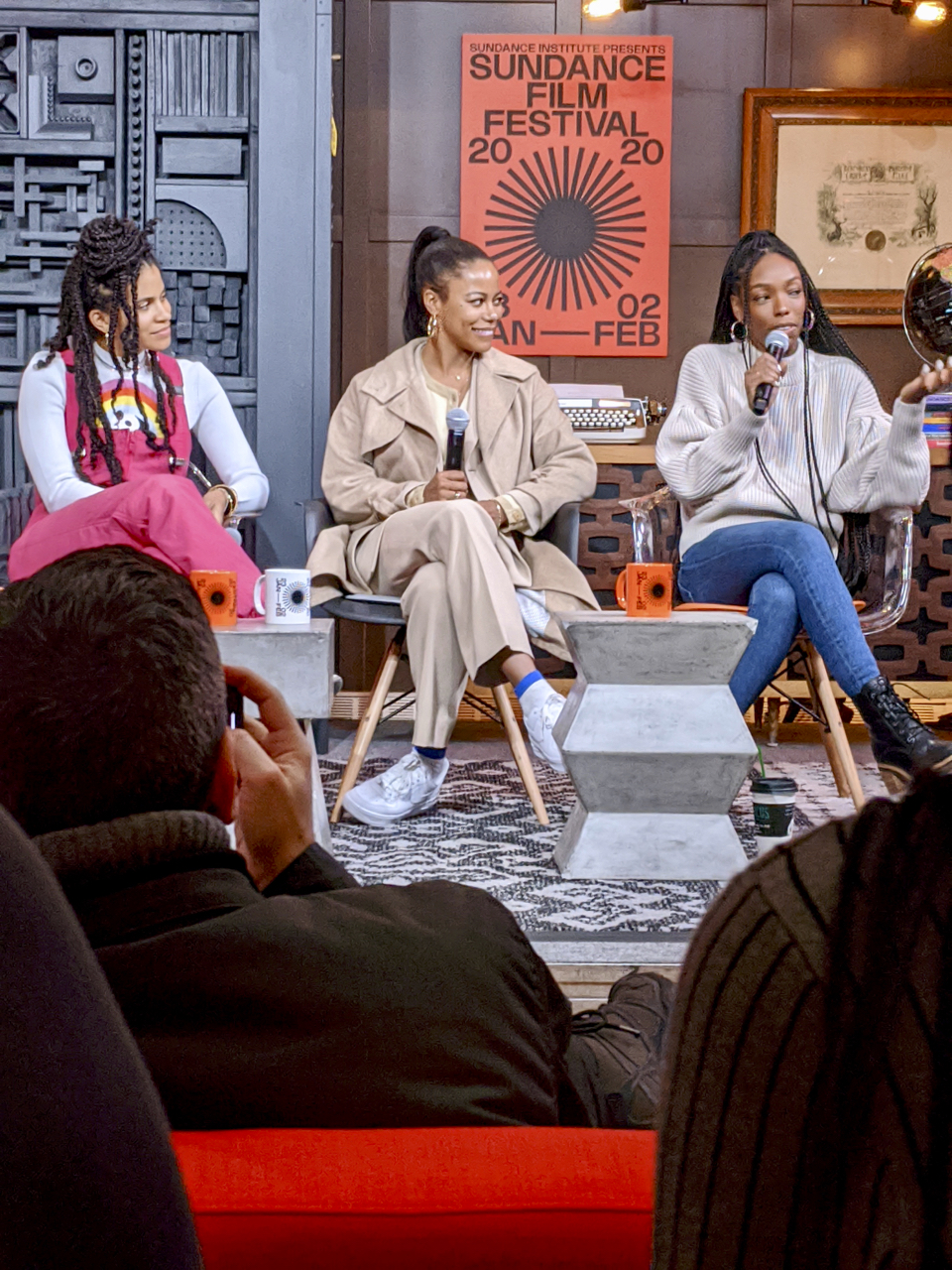
Paige (center) with Zazie Beetz (left) and Elle Lorraine (right) at the 2020 Sundance Film Festival

Paige has been featured in commercials and advertising campaigns for Transamerica, Best Buy, McDonald's, Adidas and Just Dance 3 following her stint as a Laker Girl. Her first film role was in High School Musical 3: Senior Year (2008), where she was a featured dancer.

After appearing in small roles in several short films, Paige starred as Ahsha Hayes in the sports drama television series Hit the Floor (2013–2018). She left the show in 2016 after three seasons. Also in 2016, Paige starred as the eponymous character in Canadian filmmaker Stella Meghie's directorial debut Jean of the Joneses, which was met with positive reviews. She had a supporting role as Cathy Volsan-Curry in the crime drama film White Boy Rick (2018), which was met with mixed reviews. During this time, Paige made guest appearances in the thirteenth season of Grey's Anatomy and Ballers.

Paige had her breakthrough role as the titular character in the black comedy crime film Zola (2020). The film and her performance earned rave reviews, and earned Paige the Independent Spirit Award for Best Female Lead. That same year, Paige had a supporting role as Dussie Mae in the drama film Ma Rainey's Black Bottom, which was met with critical acclaim and earned her an NAACP Image Award nomination for Outstanding Supporting Actress in a Motion Picture.

In May 2022, Paige made her music debut by contributing to rapper Kendrick Lamar's fifth studio album Mr. Morale & the Big Steppers on the critically-acclaimed track "We Cry Together", earning a Grammy Award nomination. She then co-starred alongside Lamar on its short film adaptation in September. In November, Paige was featured in Barbadian singer Rihanna's fourth installment of her Savage X Fenty Show.

Paige landed the female lead opposite Peter Dinklage and Jacob Tremblay in the superhero film The Toxic Avenger for Legendary Entertainment, released in 2023. She joined the cast of the action comedy film Beverly Hills Cop: Axel F, starring alongside Eddie Murphy and Joseph Gordon-Levitt, which was released in 2024. Also in 2024, she starred in the comedy film Brothers and the dark comedy film The Trainer.

Paige stars in the HBO supernatural horror television series It: Welcome to Derry, which is based on Stephen King's novel It (1986), and serves as a prequel to the films It (2017) and It Chapter Two (2019).

In 2026, she starred in the Boots Riley-helmed, science fiction comedy film I Love Boosters. Paige said: "It was so much fun to make. I laughed so much. It was long days, sometimes 16, 17-hour days. I was pregnant as hell, and I was having the time of my life. It’s funny, but it’s also got a very, very specific sociopolitical, economical—I mean, there’s so much commentary, but it’s fed to you in the most entertaining, fashionable, cunty way... Boots is just brilliant. Talk about a mind. We’re really lucky to be alive at the same time as Boots."

== Personal life ==
From May 2019 to August 2021, Paige was in a relationship with actor Jesse Williams. On October 5, 2022, she married fashion designer Gary "Rivington Starchild" Angulo after sharing their engagement two weeks prior. She has one son, born in 2025.

== Filmography ==
=== Film ===
Year	Title	Role	Notes
2008	High School Musical 3: Senior Year	Dancer	
2010	Alex in Wonderland: Rehearsing Wonderland	School Girl	Short film
2010	Alex in Wonderland: Interview with Debbie Allen	School Girl	Short film
2011	Mousetrap	Mousetrap Keeper #4	Short film
2015	Touched	Gina	
2016	Jean of the Joneses	Jean Jones	
2018	White Boy Rick	Cathy Volsan	
2020	Zola	A'Ziah "Zola" King	
2020	Ma Rainey's Black Bottom	Dussie Mae	
2021	Boogie	Eleanor	
2022	Sharp Stick	Treina	Also executive producer
2022	Another Country	Mother	Short film
2022	Mack & Rita	Carla	
2022	We Cry Together	Whitney Alford	Short film
2023	Magazine Dreams	Pink Coat	Released theatrically in 2025
2023	The Toxic Avenger	J.J. Doherty	
2024	Beverly Hills Cop: Axel F	Jane Saunders	
2024	Brothers	Abby Munger-Jacobson	
2024	The Trainer	Bianca Slater	
2026	I Love Boosters	Mariah	

=== Television ===
Year	Title	Role	Notes
2004	That’s So Raven	Dancer	Cameo; episode: "The Road to Audition"
2010	Making of the Laker Girls Calendar 2011	Herself	Documentary
2013	2013 Do Something Awards	Herself	Television special
2013–2016	Hit the Floor	Ahsha Hayes	Main role
2013	Hit the Floor AfterBuzz TV	Panelist	Unknown episodes
2015	Ballers	Theresa	2 episodes
2016	Grey's Anatomy	Emma	Episode: "Falling Slowly"
2024	The Baxters	Angela Manning	4 episodes
2025	It: Welcome to Derry	Charlotte Hanlon	Main role

=== Music videos ===
Year	Title	Role	Notes
2014	"She Came to Give It to You"	Dancer	Usher ft. Nicki Minaj
2022	"We Cry Together"	Whitney Alford	Kendrick Lamar ft. Paige

== Discography ==
=== Singles ===
List of singles, with year released, selected chart positions, and album name shown
Title	Year	Peak chart positions					Album
Title	Year	US	AUS	CAN	SWE	WW	Album
"We Cry Together" (with Kendrick Lamar)	2022	16	19	22	96	20	Mr. Morale & the Big Steppers

== Awards and nominations ==
Year	Award	Category	Title	Result	Ref.
2021	Critics' Choice Movie Awards	Best Acting Ensemble	Ma Rainey's Black Bottom	Nominated	
2021	NAACP Image Awards	Outstanding Supporting Actress in a Motion Picture	Ma Rainey's Black Bottom	Nominated	
2021	NAACP Image Awards	Outstanding Ensemble Cast in a Motion Picture	Ma Rainey's Black Bottom	Won	
2021	Gotham Awards	Outstanding Lead Performance	Zola	Nominated	
2022	Black Reel Awards	Outstanding Actress	Zola	Nominated	
2022	Black Reel Awards	Outstanding Breakthrough Performance, Female	Zola	Nominated	
2022	Independent Spirit Awards	Best Female Lead	Zola	Won	
2023	Grammy Awards	Album of the Year (as featured artist)	Mr. Morale & the Big Steppers	Nominated	
2026	Critics' Choice Super Awards	Best Actress in a Horror Series	It: Welcome to Derry	Nominated	
