= Wild Indian =

2021 thriller film

- Poster
- Directed by: Lyle Mitchell Corbine Jr.
- Written by: Lyle Mitchell Corbine, Jr.
- Produced by: Lyle Mitchell Corbine, Jr.; Thomas Mahoney; Eric Tavitian
- Starring: Michael Greyeyes; Chaske Spencer; Jesse Eisenberg; Kate Bosworth
- Cinematography: Eli Born
- Edited by: Ed Yonaitis
- Music by: Gavin Brivik
- Production companies: Logical Pictures; 30WEST; Om Films; BoulderLight Pictures; MM2 Entertainment; Pureplay Entertainment
- Distributed by: Vertical Entertainment
- Release dates: January 30, 2021 (Sundance); September 3, 2021 (United States)
- Running time: 90 minutes
- Country: United States
- Languages: English; Ojibwe in opening sequence

Wild Indian is a 2021 American thriller film written and directed by Lyle Mitchell Corbine Jr. The film stars Michael Greyeyes and Chaske Spencer with Jesse Eisenberg and Kate Bosworth. The film was supported by the Sundance Institute through the Writers and Directors Labs.

The film had its world premiere at the 2021 Sundance Film Festival on January 30, 2021, and was released in the United States on September 3, 2021, by Vertical Entertainment.

== Plot ==
In an opening scene a Native American man with smallpox hunts in the woods while at home his wife is dying.

Makwa Gi-Zheg is a young Ojibwe boy in Wisconsin in 1988. Abused by his father and bullied at school, his only friend is his cousin Teddo. Makwa develops a crush on a girl and is envious of James, who draws the girl's attentions.

Makwa's teacher - a priest - gives a sermon saying a tortured spirit is an unworthy sacrifice before God, and that unwillingness to accept responsibility will bring suffering that will spread like a plague.

Teddo teaches Makwa how to shoot a rifle. Makwa holds a kitchen knife over his sleeping father's head. In the woods he chances to see James walking and calmly takes aim and shoots him. He picks up the spent shell casing. Makwa asks Teddo for help and they bury James together. At home when his father makes to strike him, he bites his father's hand. He runs to the woods and urinates where James's body is buried.

In 2019, Makwa is a businessman in California calling himself Michael Peterson. He has an infant son with his white wife Greta. He asks a co-worker his opinion on his braid, saying "It's sort of my brand around here." The co-worker agrees that it ticks all the right boxes. After an initially impassive response to Greta's news that she is pregnant, he assures her he is pleased. He then goes to a club and pays to choke a stripper, continuing to choke her long after she begins to panic. He recites Hail Marys.

Teddo is released from his latest prison term, a ten-year sentence for drug dealing. He moves in with his sister Cammy and her young son Daniel. She apologizes for not visiting him. He gets a job and bonds with Daniel. Cammy tells him Makwa has moved away and never returned, even for family funerals. He retrieves stashed money and a pistol and visits James' mother, Lisa. He breaks down sobbing, saying he has to tell her about her son.

Makwa finds Teddo waiting outside his apartment building and hustles him in before people can see him. Teddo draws his pistol. Makwa asks if he wants money, a car, a job. Teddo says he confessed and shoots Makwa in the arm. He aims but is unable to shoot again, and lays the gun down. Taking the gun, Makwa asks if he told them about him. Teddo says he did and Makwa immediately fires several times, killing Teddo.

Makwa's attorney assures him that it is clearly self defense, but that a Wisconsin investigator wants to speak to him about a boy's disappearance 35 years ago. Remains have been found and Makwa has been implicated. In Wisconsin an attorney tells Makwa he could be charged with James' murder, based on the remains and Teddo's confession to Lisa. Makwa takes flowers to the bedridden Lisa in hospital to assure her of his innocence, calling Teddo mentally ill, drunk, and criminal. Lisa believes Teddo. Makwa claims all the worthwhile Native Americans died fighting, and his generation is descended from cowards. He puts his hand over her mouth, threatening what will happen if she doesn't keep her mouth shut. Lisa says she won't say anything.

The prosecutor asks Makwa perfunctory questions about the day of James' murder. Makwa says he doesn't recall. The prosecutor says Teddo's claims aren't credible based on his criminality and mental state, and Lisa is in a state herself. He regards James' death as just another missing Native American and ends the interview. Before getting into his car, Makwa takes the spent shell casing from his pocket and drops it on the ground.

In California, Makwa receives his promotion but declines to celebrate. Saying he doesn't know if he will be okay, he leaves for home where he shows Greta his bullet wound. He goes to the beach and gazes out to sea. The film cuts to the Native American man with smallpox lying next to his dead wife. Makwa collapses into a sitting position on the beach.

== Cast ==
- Michael Greyeyes as Makwa ("Michael Peterson")
  - Phoenix Wilson as young Makwa
- Chaske Spencer as Teddo
  - Julian Gopal as young Teddo
- Jesse Eisenberg as Jerry
- Kate Bosworth as Greta Peterson
- Jenna Leigh Green as Ivy
- Lisa Gromarty as Cammy
- Scott Haze as Father Daniels
- Joel Michaely as Jonathan
- Sheri Foster Blake as Lisa Wolf
- Colton Knaus as James Wolf

== Release ==
The film had its world premiere at the 2021 Sundance Film Festival on January 30, 2021, in the U.S. Dramatic Competition section. In May 2021, Vertical Entertainment acquired distribution rights to the film.

== Reception ==
The review aggregator website Rotten Tomatoes surveyed 65 critics and, categorizing the reviews as positive or negative, assessed 59 as positive and 6 as negative for an 91% rating. The website's consensus reads, "While Wild Indian might have benefited from a more probing approach to its themes, it's held together by Lyle Mitchell Corbine Jr.'s skilled direction and a strong performance from lead Michael Greyeyes." On Metacritic, which sampled 11 critics and calculated a weighted average of 74 out of 100, the film received "generally favorable reviews".

Variety named Lyle Mitchell Corbine Jr. one of the "10 Directors to Watch" for his work on the film. Michael Greyeyes was nominated for the Gotham Award for Outstanding Lead Performance at the 2021 Gotham Awards. For the 37th Independent Spirit Awards, Wild Indian received four nominations in the categories Best First Feature, Best First Screenplay, Best Male Lead (Michael Greyeyes), and Best Supporting Male (Chaske Spencer).
