= In the Same Breath =

2021 documentary film by Nanfu Wang

- Official poster
- Directed by: Nanfu Wang
- Produced by: Nanfu Wang; Christopher Clements; Julie Goldman; Carolyn Hepburn; Jialing Zhang
- Cinematography: Jarred Alterman; Peter Alton; Tom Bergmann; Gil De la Rosa; Michelle Gao; Yuanchen Liu; Rex Miller; Martina Radwan; Sam Rong; Michael Shade; R.C. Song; Paul Szynol; K. Yang; Matt Yu
- Edited by: Michael Shade; Nanfu Wang
- Music by: Nathan Halpern
- Production companies: HBO Documentary Films; Cinetic Media; Little Horse Crossing the River; Little Lantern Company; Motto Pictures
- Distributed by: HBO
- Release dates: January 28, 2021 (Sundance); August 12, 2021 (United States)
- Running time: 95 minutes
- Country: United States

In the Same Breath is a 2021 documentary film directed and produced by Nanfu Wang. It follows how the Chinese and American governments reacted to the outbreak of the COVID-19 pandemic.

It had its world premiere at the Sundance Film Festival on January 28, 2021. It was released in a limited release on August 12, 2021, by HBO Documentary Films prior to its broadcast on HBO on August 18, 2021.

== Synopsis ==
The film follows the response of the Chinese and American governments to the COVID-19 pandemic.

== Production ==
While Nanfu Wang was still working on another project, she set out to make a short film about the Chinese government's response to the COVID-19 pandemic, leaving her son with her mother. But as COVID-19 spread, Wang became worried and started looking for more information during her stay in China, she found that much of it was censored or false propaganda disseminated by the Chinese government. She began contacting cinematographers in Wuhan, China and soon realized that the stories about the pandemic were too important to be in a short film. She started incorporating the American response to the pandemic after seeing some U.S. health officials share misinformation about it. HBO Documentary Films came on board to produce and distribute the film.

== Release ==
The film had its world premiere at the Sundance Film Festival on January 28, 2021. It also screened at South by Southwest in March 2021. It was released in a limited release on August 12, 2021, prior to its broadcast on HBO on August 18, 2021.

== Reception ==
=== Critical reception ===
On Rotten Tomatoes, the film has an approval rating of 96% based on reviews from 50 critics, with an average rating of 8.40/10. The critics' consensus reads: "Gripping and clear-eyed, In the Same Breath captures history as it's being written -- and governmental failures as they amplify worldwide tragedy."

=== Accolades ===
Award	Date of ceremony	Category	Recipient(s)	Result	Ref.
Cinema Eye Honors	March 1, 2022	Outstanding Direction	Nanfu Wang	Nominated	
Cinema Eye Honors	March 1, 2022	Outstanding Production	Nanfu Wang, Jialing Zhang, Julie Goldman, Christopher Clements, and Carolyn Hepburn	Nominated	
Cinema Eye Honors	March 1, 2022	Outstanding Broadcast Film	In the Same Breath	Won	
IDA Documentary Awards	March 4, 2022	Best Feature	Nanfu Wang, Jialing Zhang, Julie Goldman, Christopher Clements, and Carolyn Hepburn	Nominated	
Independent Spirit Awards	March 6, 2022	Best Documentary Feature	In the Same Breath	Nominated	
Producers Guild of America Awards	March 19, 2022	Outstanding Producer of Documentary Motion Pictures	Nanfu Wang, Jialing Zhang, Julie Goldman, Christopher Clements, and Carolyn Hepburn	Nominated	
Peabody Awards	June 6–9, 2022	Documentary	In the Same Breath	Won	
