= Zola (film) =

2020 film by Janicza Bravo

- Theatrical release poster
- Directed by: Janicza Bravo
- Screenplay by: Janicza Bravo; Jeremy O. Harris
- Based on: "Zola Tells All: The Real Story Behind the Greatest Stripper Saga Ever Tweeted" by David Kushner; Tweets by A'Ziah "Zola" King
- Produced by: Kara Baker; Dave Franco; Elizabeth Haggard; David Hinojosa; Vince Jolivette; Christine Vachon; Gia Walsh
- Starring: Taylour Paige; Riley Keough; Nicholas Braun; Colman Domingo; Jason Mitchell; Ari'el Stachel
- Cinematography: Ari Wegner
- Edited by: Joi McMillon
- Music by: Mica Levi
- Production companies: Killer Films; Ramona Films; Gigi Films
- Distributed by: A24
- Release dates: January 24, 2020 (Sundance); June 30, 2021 (United States)
- Running time: 86 minutes
- Country: United States
- Language: English
- Budget: $5 million
- Box office: $5.2 million

Zola (stylized as @zola) is a 2020 American black comedy crime film directed by Janicza Bravo and co-written by Bravo and Jeremy O. Harris. It is based on a viral Twitter thread from 2015 by A'Ziah "Zola" King and the resulting Rolling Stone article "Zola Tells All: The Real Story Behind the Greatest Stripper Saga Ever Tweeted" by David Kushner. Starring Taylour Paige, Riley Keough, Nicholas Braun, and Colman Domingo, the film follows a part-time stripper who is convinced by her new friend to go on a road trip to Tampa, Florida to earn money dancing, only to get in over her head.

Zola premiered at the Sundance Film Festival on January 24, 2020, where it was nominated for the Grand Jury Prize. It was theatrically released in the United States on June 30, 2021, following a year's delay due to the COVID-19 pandemic. It received highly positive reviews from critics, with praise directed towards the screenplay, performances (particularly those of Paige, Keough, and Domingo), and editing, and earned a leading seven nominations at the 37th Independent Spirit Awards, including Best Film, Best Director, and Best Screenplay with two wins for Best Female Lead for Paige and Best Editing for Joi McMillon.

== Plot ==
A'Ziah "Zola" King, a self-assured waitress and part-time stripper in Detroit, meets Stefani, an outgoing and crass fellow stripper. Stefani invites Zola to dance with her at a club that night, and the next day, Stefani proposes they embark on a road trip to Tampa, Florida, claiming they can make significant money at a secret strip club there. They set out for Tampa with Zola's mysterious roommate, X, and Stefani's dimwitted boyfriend Derrek.

They leave Derrek at a seedy motel while they visit the Tampa club where Stefani claims friends earned over $5,000 in one night. When they perform their earnings are significantly lower. Zola learns that Stefani and X have posted photos of her and Stefani in a Backpage advertisement offering sex. Zola tries to leave, but when X threatens her, Zola realizes X is not a roommate but Stefani's pimp. X takes the women to an upscale hotel. Stefani has sex with a male client. Zola refuses to participate and is incredulous X charges only $150 per client. Zola edits the Backpage ad, changing the rate to $500 to help Stefani earn more money. When Stefani earns over $8,000, X is impressed enough to overlook Zola's intervention.

When X, Stefani, and Zola return to the motel, X is enraged to discover that Derrek has befriended a man named Dion and told him their reason for visiting Tampa. Worried that Dion and his associates will rob them, X forces the group to flee to another hotel and arranges for Stefani to see clients at remote locations. Zola accompanies her to ensure Stefani's safety. When Derrek argues with Stefani, Zola learns she has previously manipulated other dancers into participating in prostitution rackets. The quarrel is interrupted when X bursts in with Baybe, his lover and madam, who is armed with a gun. X gives Zola a gun for the women's protection and accompanies Stefani to meet more clients.

Stefani engages in a gang bang at a private residence, and describes herself to her clients as a woman of God who was meeting her community leader when she met Zola, claiming Zola begged her to ask X for permission to dance at a club he promotes. Stefani portrays Zola in a racially stereotypical and unflattering way. At the next hotel, a client responding to their Backpage ad forces Stefani into a room. Zola flees and calls X and Derrek. The three return to the room where Dion and an accomplice are armed with shotguns. They posed as clients to rob Stefani, who they beat unconscious. X offers the men $50,000 and possession of Zola to let him and Derrek leave with Stefani. When Zola is sexually assaulted by Dion, X manages to draw the gun from her purse and shoot Dion in the throat. The four flee the hotel and arrive at the luxurious home X shares with Baybe. X lets Zola leave and announces his possession of Stefani. Distraught, Derrek throws himself over a balcony and injures his head on the concrete below. As Zola, Stefani, and X drive Derrek to the hospital, Stefani proclaims her love for Zola, who looks out the window without responding.

== Cast ==
- Taylour Paige as A'Ziah "Zola" King
- Riley Keough as Stefani
- Nicholas Braun as Derrek
- Colman Domingo as Abegunde "X" Olawale
- Ari'el Stachel as Sean
- Jason Mitchell as Dion
- Ts Madison as Hollywood
- Nelcie Souffrant as Gail
- Nasir Rahim as Jonathan
- Sophie Hall as Baybe
- Jarquale Stewart as CC

== Production ==
In October 2015, Detroit waitress A'Ziah "Zola" King posted a 148-tweet thread about a trip she took to Florida with a stripper named Jessica; the story, containing details of prostitution, murder and an attempted suicide, quickly went viral, garnering the recognition of people such as Missy Elliott, Solange Knowles and Ava DuVernay. About a month later, Rolling Stone's David Kushner published an article interviewing people involved in the story; while the article noted several inconsistencies, and King has admitted to embellishing some of the more sensational details, most of those involved have admitted to the general events.

In February 2016, it was announced James Franco would direct the film from a screenplay by Andrew Neel and Mike Roberts. Franco, Vince Jolivette, Christine Vachon, David Hinojosa, and Kara Baker were to produce the film under their Rabbit Bandini Productions, Killer Films and Gigi Films banners, respectively. In January 2018, it was announced that the film was initially set to begin production in February 2018, but was shelved following sexual misconduct allegations against Franco. In June 2018, it was announced that Janicza Bravo would direct, replacing Franco, and that A24 would distribute. In October 2018, Taylour Paige was cast in the lead role. That month, Riley Keough, Nicholas Braun, Colman Domingo and Jason Mitchell joined the cast, and in November 2018, Ari'el Stachel joined the cast.

Principal photography began on October 29, 2018. The entire film was shot in 27 days. Production concluded on December 7, 2018.

== Release ==
The film premiered at the Sundance Film Festival on January 24, 2020, where it was nominated for the Grand Jury Awards pre-screening. Sony Pictures Worldwide Acquisitions, under the Stage 6 Films banner, acquired the international rights (excluding Canada, China, and Japan). It was released in the United States on June 30, 2021.

== Reception ==
=== Box office ===
In the United States and Canada, Zola was projected to gross $2–4 million from 1,468 theaters in its opening weekend. It made $505,000 on its first day of release and $282,000 on its second. It went on to debut to $1.2 million in its opening weekend and $2 million over the five-day frame, finishing ninth at the box office. It fell 48% to $620,000 in its second weekend, finishing 10th.

=== Critical response ===
On review aggregator website Rotten Tomatoes, the film holds an approval rating of 88% based on 252 reviews, with an average rating of 7.5/10. The site's critical consensus reads, "Zola captures the stranger-than-fiction appeal of the viral Twitter thread that inspired it – and announces director/co-writer Janicza Bravo as a filmmaker to watch." On Metacritic, the film has a weighted average score of 76 out of 100, based on 46 critics, indicating "generally favorable reviews". PostTrak reported that 68% of audience members gave Zola positive score, with 46% saying they would definitely recommend it.

Writing for The A.V. Club, Shannon Miller gave the film a grade of "B" and said: "Zola is first and foremost a zany, catastrophic road-trip dramedy, one that balances the whimsy of social media with the harrowing reality of being trapped in a dangerous situation." Critic Owen Gleiberman of Variety called Zola "a true story so extravagant it feels like it must have been made up. It's a mini volcano of sex and violence and danger and deception. It's a close-to-the-bone portrait of women who work in the sex industry. It's a youthquake as real as American Honey. It's a piece of pure filmmaking bravura."

Peter Debruge, also writing for Variety, praised the "virtuoso filmmaking and a pair of killer performances" but wrote: "Sure, it's fun to see a movie skewer the vapid soullessness of social media and the unregulated economy of male desire, but Zola ultimately rings hollow. The actors are fearless, and yet, how much do we know about these characters in the end? The answer: something of their values, but almost nothing of their lives."

Writing for The Face, Ludwig Hurtado said the film was a canonical part of a genre he named "Tampa-core," which he described as presenting a "hyper-stylised vision of Florida" with "all the violence and drama of a classic western"; he included Waves and Spring Breakers as comparable titles.

In June 2025, IndieWire ranked the film at number 59 on its list of "The 100 Best Movies of the 2020s (So Far)."

=== Accolades ===
| Award | Date of ceremony | Category | Recipient(s) | Result | Ref. |
|---|---|---|---|---|---|
| Austin Film Critics Association | January 11, 2022 | Best Supporting Actor | Colman Domingo | Nominated | |
| Black Film Critics Circle | December 22, 2021 | Pioneer Award | Janicza Bravo | Won | |
| Black Reel Awards | February 27, 2022 | Outstanding Independent Film | Janicza Bravo | Won | |
| Black Reel Awards | February 27, 2022 | Outstanding Emerging Director | Janicza Bravo | Nominated | |
| Black Reel Awards | February 27, 2022 | Outstanding Actress | Taylour Paige | Nominated | |
| Black Reel Awards | February 27, 2022 | Outstanding Breakthrough Performance, Female | Taylour Paige | Nominated | |
| Black Reel Awards | February 27, 2022 | Outstanding Supporting Actor | Colman Domingo | Won | |
| Black Reel Awards | February 27, 2022 | Outstanding Breakthrough Screenwriter | Janicza Bravo and Jeremy O. Harris | Nominated | |
| Black Reel Awards | February 27, 2022 | Outstanding Editing | Joi McMillon | Nominated | |
| Black Reel Awards | February 27, 2022 | Outstanding Ensemble | Kim Coleman | Nominated | |
| Chicago Film Critics Association | December 15, 2021 | Best Supporting Actor | Colman Domingo | Nominated | |
| Chicago Film Critics Association | December 15, 2021 | Best Supporting Actress | Riley Keough | Nominated | |
| Gotham Independent Film Awards | November 30, 2021 | Outstanding Lead Performance | Taylour Paige | Nominated | |
| Gotham Independent Film Awards | November 30, 2021 | Outstanding Supporting Performance | Colman Domingo | Nominated | |
| Independent Spirit Awards | March 6, 2022 | Best Film | Janicza Bravo | Nominated | |
| Independent Spirit Awards | March 6, 2022 | Best Director | Janicza Bravo | Nominated | |
| Independent Spirit Awards | March 6, 2022 | Best Female Lead | Taylour Paige | Won | |
| Independent Spirit Awards | March 6, 2022 | Best Supporting Male | Colman Domingo | Nominated | |
| Independent Spirit Awards | March 6, 2022 | Best Screenplay | Janicza Bravo and Jeremy O. Harris | Nominated | |
| Independent Spirit Awards | March 6, 2022 | Best Cinematography | Ari Wegner | Nominated | |
| Independent Spirit Awards | March 6, 2022 | Best Editing | Joi McMillon | Won | |
| Palm Springs International Film Festival | January 2, 2020 | Creative Impact Awards | Janicza Bravo | Won | |
| Philadelphia Film Critics Circle | December 13, 2021 | Best Supporting Actor | Colman Domingo | Nominated | |
| Philadelphia Film Critics Circle | December 13, 2021 | Best Script | Janicza Bravo and Jeremy O. Harris | Nominated | |
| Sundance Film Festival | January 23, 2020 | Grand Jury Prizes – Dramatic | Janicza Bravo | Nominated | |

==== Awards controversy ====
In 2021, Zola was nominated for seven Independent Spirit Awards, including Best Screenplay. A'Ziah "Zola" King was not nominated as a writer for the movie, nor was she invited to attend. King was frustrated by this snub, writing on Twitter, "I think it's hilarious ZOLA is up for 7 awards and no one thought to invite me nor include me IN the writers award category. As if there would've been a film or a script to write if I didn't um… write it?" She said that her issue was only with A24, as writers Harris and Bravo had been very supportive to her.
