= The Killing of Kenneth Chamberlain =

2019 American thriller-drama film

- Film poster
- Directed by: David Midell
- Written by: David Midell
- Produced by: David Midell; Enrico Natale; Sharad Chib; Chris Paladino; Milan Chakraborty
- Starring: Frankie Faison; Steve O'Connell; Enrico Natale; Ben Marten; LaRoyce Hawkins; Anika Noni Rose
- Cinematography: Camrin Petramale
- Edited by: Enrico Natale
- Music by: Garrett Beelow; King Luck
- Production companies: Redbird Entertainment; Revelations Entertainment
- Distributed by: Gravitas Ventures
- Release dates: October 27, 2019 (Austin); September 17, 2021 (United States)
- Running time: 83 minutes
- Country: United States
- Language: English

The Killing of Kenneth Chamberlain is a 2019 American thriller drama film written, produced and directed by David Midell and starring Frankie Faison as the real life titular character. It is based on the police shooting of Chamberlain that occurred on November 29, 2011, in White Plains, New York. Morgan Freeman and Lori McCreary serve as executive producers of the film.

== Plot ==
Kenneth Chamberlain, an elderly veteran living in an apartment building, accidentally triggers his medical alert pendant early in the morning. Emergency services are dispatched, with three police officers arriving at his door. They tell Kenneth that they are there to check on his welfare. Kenneth—while keeping his door closed—informs them that he did not mean to call anyone, and that the medical alert was an accident. The police want to make "visual contact," insisting that they enter Kenneth's apartment. Kenneth refuses to open his door, making the police suspicious that there is something illegal happening inside (though there is not). Kenneth is highly nervous, convinced that the police will hurt him. Kenneth mumbles to himself, which the police misinterpret as someone else inside with him, further fueling their suspicions. One police officer wants to defuse the situation and leave Kenneth in peace, but is reprimanded by his fellow officers.

The situation escalates and tensions rise. Backup is called in. Eventually, the police attempt to break into Kenneth's apartment by force. Kenneth insists that this is illegal and that the officers have neither a search warrant nor a probable cause to enter. Kenneth, panicking, uses a knife through the opening of the door to attempt to get the police to leave. One police officer calls Kenneth a racial slur. The police break down Kenneth's door, restrain him, tase him, and fatally shoot him.

== Cast ==
- Frankie Faison as Kenneth Chamberlain Sr.
- Steve O'Connell as Sergeant Walter Parks
- Enrico Natale as Officer Michael Rossi
- Ben Marten as Officer Patrick Jackson
- Angela Peel as Tonyia Greenhill
- Tom McElroy as Sergeant Flannigan
- LaRoyce Hawkins as Kenneth Chamberlain Jr.
- Christopher R. Ellis as Officer Talbot
- Anika Noni Rose as Candace Wade
- Antonio Polk as Officer Evans
- Dexter Zollicoffer as Roland Green
- Kelly Owens as Mitzi Pratt
- Armando Reyes as Armando Ruiz
- Eunice Woods as Karen Chamberlain
- Daniel Houle as Lieutenant Hughes
- Linda Bright Clay as Carol Matthews
- Kate Black-Spence as Dispatcher
- Alexander Strong as Ava Chamberlain
- Nayeli Pagaza as 911 Operator

Kristine Angela, Joey Ascaridis, Moira Begale, Nick Cardiff and Jared Winkler also play additional roles.

== Release ==
The film made its world premiere at the Austin Film Festival in October 2019.

== Reception ==
On the review aggregator website Rotten Tomatoes, 97% of 32 critics' reviews are positive. The website's consensus reads: "The Killing of Kenneth Chamberlain draws on harrowing real-life events -- and Frankie Faison's remarkable performance -- for a scathing rebuke to a systemic failure." Metacritic, which uses a weighted average, assigned the film a score of 82 out of 100, based on 5 critics, indicating "universal acclaim".

== Accolades ==
The film won the Best Narrative Feature Award at the 24th Urbanworld Film Festival.

Association	Date of ceremony	Category	Recipients	Result	Ref(s).
Independent Spirit Awards	March 6, 2022	Best Male Lead	Frankie Faison	Nominated	
Independent Spirit Awards	March 6, 2022	Best Editing	Enrico Natale	Nominated	
Gotham Awards	November 29, 2021	Outstanding Lead Performance	Frankie Faison	Won	
