= Henry Lau (fashion designer) =

Hong Kong fashion designer

- 劉志華
- Born: May 10, 1973 (age 53); Hong Kong
- Education: Hong Kong Polytechnic University
- Occupation: Fashion designer

Henry Lau (劉志華) (b. May 10, 1973 in Hong Kong) is a Hong Kong fashion designer. He has a chain of retail shops called Spy Henry Lau.

== History ==
Lau began to design clothing while he was a student at Hong Kong Polytechnic University in 1992. He received his Bachelor of Arts in Fashion Design in 1995. Lau participated in costume creation and image design for different local singers and celebrities such as Leslie Cheung, Anita Mui, Jay Chow, Hacken Lee, etc......

In 1996, Lau joined a fashion house and created trendy high fashion for Japan and South East Asia. The next year, he opened his own studio.

Lau opened his first shop, Spy Theatre, at the Rise commercial building in Tsim Sha Tsui in 1998. Spy Theatre's mission is to provide fashion to young and trendy people. In March 1998, Lau presented his first in-house fashion show. Not only was it successful, but Lau also made the Rise commercial building another trendy shopping center for the fashion conscious in Hong Kong. In October 1998, Lau hosted his Autumn/Winter Collection, entitled "Spy at Sea", in Central. This afternoon fashion show was held on the street, and pedestrians were part of the show.

In July 1999, Lau presented his latest collection in "Hong Kong Fashion Flash Show for Spring/Summer 2000" for Hong Kong Fashion Week. This collection successfully attracted a buyer, Joyce Boutique, who developed the "Shen" label now available at Joyce Boutique. In October, Lau was invited by Nokia to design 20 sets for their products. The next year, Lau would design costumes for cable TV hosts, especially for their millennium show.

Lau held a house show in HK Fashion Week in January 2000. His collection was described as "the most picture-perfect show of the week" by the Hong Kong and Singapore media. In March, Lau was invited by Beijing Fashion Week to present his latest Spring/Summer collection. In May 2000, Lau designed 30 showpieces for the worldwide diamond company Debeers. In early June, Lau was invited by Singapore Motorola to present his latest collection with their new phone promotion campaign. In September, Lau opened his second shop in Causeway Bay, which featured a more delicate design collection.

In 2001 Lau opened his third shop in Causeway Bay as a couture house, and started he first consignment crossover with the new concept store A02. The next year, he designed four sets of costumes for Cantonese pop queen Anita Mui's 2002 concert, and started to sell his collection in Shanghai.

Lau was invited by popular singer Hacken Lee to design her entire wardrobe for the music awards in 2003. The same year, Lau was a costume designer for Hacken's concerts. In March, Lau was invited to hold a fashion show in Beijing. In May, he was invited to hold a fashion show in Sydney, sponsored by Australian Fashion Week. His collection impressed many foreign buyers, as a result of selling his collection to trendy stores like "acurmen" in Sydney, and Villa Moda in Kuwait and Dubai. In October, Lau's first franchised shop opened in Beijing, attracting many stars and singers as his customers.

In January 2004, Lau was invited by a local magazine, Zip, to hold a fashion show for HK Fashion Week. This collection would help Lau successfully open a new market, India, in which Dubai company Villa Moda has placed over a million after Lau's successful collections in Dubai and Kuwait. Just one week after the fashion show, Lau again designed costumes for a Hacken Lee concert. His costumes impressed the press and audience, and the newspaper quoted, "Hacken was wearing an art piece more than a costume..."

In January 2014, Lau presented his "Street Sophistication" collection, inspired by an innocent girl's dream to become a Hollywood star, at HK Fashion Extravaganza.
