= Killing of Kenneth Chamberlain Sr. =

2011 fatal police shooting of a black man

Shooting of Kenneth Chamberlain Sr
- Date: November 19, 2011
- Time: 05:00 EST (10:00 UTC)
- Location: Winbrook Public Housing 135 S Lexington Ave White Plains, NY 10601 U.S.; 41.0274052°N 73.7734441°W
- Cause: Gun-shot wounds
- Participants: Kenneth Chamberlain Sr, Several police officers, Medical alert operator, Sister of Kenneth Chamberlain Sr.
- Deaths: 1
- Charges: None; no indictment by grand jury

Kenneth Chamberlain Sr was fatally shot by police on November 19, 2011, in White Plains, New York. After his LifeAid medical alert necklace was inadvertently triggered, police came to his home and demanded that he open his front door. Despite his objections and statements that he did not need help, the police broke down Chamberlain's door. According to police, Chamberlain charged at them with a knife and he was tasered, and then fatally shot. Chamberlain was a 68-year-old, Black, retired Marine, and a 20-year veteran of the Westchester County Department of Corrections. He wore the medical alert pendant due to a chronic heart problem.

The shooting was the topic of the 2019 film The Killing of Kenneth Chamberlain.

== Shooting ==
On November 19, 2011 at approximately 5:22 a.m., 68-year-old Kenneth Chamberlain was at home in the Winbrook Public Housing apartment at 135 S. Lexington Avenue in White Plains, New York. His LifeAid medical alert necklace was triggered, sending an alert to a LifeAid customer service operator, who in turn called the City of White Plains Department of Public Safety.

In response, police officers, firefighters, and emergency medical technicians were dispatched. At Chamberlain's home, police knocked on his door. Chamberlain told them through the door, he did not call them, did not require assistance, was not having a medical emergency, and asked them to leave.

Upon breaking down his door, they entered Chamberlain's apartment. Police alleged Chamberlain came at them with a butcher knife when they broke down the door. Chamberlain's family claims the elderly Chamberlain was unarmed, and did not resist. Police tased him, and then shot him with a bean bag round fired from a shotgun. According to police, Chamberlain continued to charge at officers with the knife when Officer Anthony Carelli (whose name was withheld for over four months after the incident) shot him twice in the chest with live ammunition. A camera mounted on the taser captured the tasing, but was not functioning during the shooting. Chamberlain later died in surgery at White Plains Hospital.

== Autopsy ==
An autopsy conducted on November 21, 2011, revealed that one bullet hit Chamberlain sideways, passing through his right arm and then both lungs. The other bullet seems to have missed. The autopsy, performed by Westchester County Chief Medical Examiner Kunjlata Ashar, also revealed taser burns on Chamberlain's neck and abdomen. Chamberlain's blood contained alcohol content of 0.11, and the muscle-relaxant cyclobenzaprine. The autopsy found "no drugs of abuse" in Chamberlain's system.

Kenneth Chamberlain Jr. responded, "I'm glad the autopsy is out and shows that my father's hands were at his sides. It absolutely shows that my father wasn't the aggressor and that deadly force was not necessary."

== Consequences ==
=== District Attorney and Grand jury inactions ===
In 2012, a grand jury reviewed the case and decided that no criminal charge would be made against police officers involved in the killing. Westchester District Attorney Janet DiFiore (now New York's Chief Judge) defended her decision not to prosecute Carelli and his colleagues on the grounds that they "acted appropriately," and that "there was no reasonable cause" to indict Carelli for murder. DiFiore also neglected to take any disciplinary action against officer Steven Hart for calling Chamberlain a "nigger".

=== Police department review ===
In May 2012, White Plains mayor Thomas Roach announced that he would bring in "outside experts to do a broad review of" policy for the city's police department. The commission's chair was Dr. Maria Haberfeld, a political science professor at John Jay College of Criminal Justice and the academic coordinator for New York's Executive Police Institute.

After a four-month investigation, the report concluded that Chamberlain's shooting was justifiable because it happened "after negotiations and when all non-lethal means were unsuccessful." The family's lawyers and groups such as Blacks in Law Enforcement of America (BLEA) have criticized the report for failing to consider and address various issues.

=== Federal investigation ===
Chamberlain's family asked U.S. Attorney General Eric Holder and U.S. Attorney Preet Bharara for a "criminal investigation," and in May 2012 the U.S. Attorney's Office announced that it would investigate whether federal civil rights law was violated. In January 2018, federal prosecutors decided not to bring any charges.

=== Petition ===
An online petition was created by the son of Kenneth Chamberlain Sr. By April 6, 2012, it had received nearly 199,900 signatures. It asks for an end to police misconduct and brutality, and for the officers involved to be "indicted and charged with murder and civil rights violations." The petition will be delivered to the County District Attorney for Westchester, Janet DiFiore.

Chamberlain Jr. said he was inspired by the petition circulated online by the parents of shooting victim Trayvon Martin, saying, "I signed Trayvon's petition, sat back and thought, 'Well, maybe I should do a petition.'" As of May 3, 2012, the petition had received at least 208,000 signatures.

=== Civil suit ===
On July 2, 2012, a federal civil suit for $21 million was filed by the victim's son, Kenneth Chamberlain Jr., against the City of White Plains and the White Plains Police Department. In November 2012, the Chamberlain family amended their lawsuit to require the city to modify police procedures with the mentally ill.

The case went to trial on November 7, 2016. The jury found neither the police nor the city liable. The family has appealed, arguing that the judge improperly excluded evidence. The appellate court heard argument on March 22, 2018.

=== Appeals court decision ===
In June 2020, an appellate court ruled that the federal judge erred when she dismissed some of the claims in the lawsuit filed in 2011. The ruling restores claims of non-lethal excessive force and unlawful entry in the killing of Chamberlain. The court found that the lawsuit presented sufficient allegations that "a reasonable, experienced officer would not be justified in believing that entry into the apartment was necessary." Chamberlain's son expressed joy upon hearing the ruling saying, "The appeals court has confirmed what we knew all along: That they violated my father's 4th Amendment rights." Chamberlain Jr. and his lawyers noted and found it appropriate that the ruling came at a time of nationwide protests following the murder of George Floyd.

=== Settlement ===
In August 2023, White Plains settled with the family for $5 million.

== Racism ==
Accusations of racism have been leveled at the police officers involved, at DA Janet DiFiore, and at law enforcement and justice systems that were reluctant to react. Chamberlain's son, Kenneth Chamberlain Jr., discussed these issues with lawyer Mayo Bartlett on Democracy Now, highlighting the absurdity of the police shooting a person they were summoned to help, as well as the unusual delay in the grand jury investigation. Chamberlain Jr. said "I wasn't trying to turn this into any type of racially motivated killing, until we heard the audio"—in particular, Hart's use of the word "nigger." On February 15, 2012, Kenneth Chamberlain Jr. said his lawyers had filed a notice of claim informing the city, White Plains Public Safety Department, and White Plains Housing Authority to expect the wrongful death lawsuit.

Demonstrations were held to protest racism and dereliction of duty by District Attorney Janet DiFiore. Damon K. Jones, representing Blacks in Law Enforcement of America, demanded that DiFiore be investigated by Preet Bharara's office.

=== White Plains Police Department ===
Lawyer Mayo Bartlett points out that the White Plains police system wrote their reports to cover up racism and wrongdoing by the officers. Their transcript of the incident omitted Hart's use of the word "nigger," as well as the information that the original call had been for a medical emergency. Public Safety Commissioner David Chong said in a May 3, 2012 statement that the Police Department would conduct an internal review of the incident and fully cooperate with an independent study to be done by a panel of experts to review the department's policies and procedures and recommend any improvements.
