= Lyle Mitchell Corbine Jr. =

American filmmaker

Lyle Mitchell Corbine Jr. (born 1989) is an American and Ojibwe filmmaker from the Bad River Reservation in Wisconsin. His debut feature, Wild Indian (2021), was screened in the U.S. Dramatic Competition at the 2021 Sundance Film Festival.

== Early life, family and education ==
Corbine was born in La Crosse, Wisconsin and is an enrolled member of the Bad River Band of the Lake Superior Tribe of Chippewa Indians. He is the son of Mitch Corbine, a Native American gaming casino general manager; and Carole Livingston, an Indian Health Service (IHS) clinical psychologist. He was raised in several small towns and Indian reservations in Minnesota and Wisconsin. He attended the University of Minnesota, where he studied English and Philosophy.

== Career ==
Corbine started his filmmaking career by making fourteen no-budget films before two of his short films were selected to screen by the Sundance Film Festival and the Toronto International Film Festival. He was one of Filmmaker magazine's 25 New Faces of Indie Film in 2019. Later, he studied with the Sundance Institute Feature Film Program, who assisted in producing his first feature, Wild Indian, which focuses on two Ojibwe men (portrayed by Michael Greyeyes and Chaske Spencer) as they attempt to reconcile a fractured past.

Variety named Corbine one of the "10 Directors to Watch" for his work on Wild Indian. The film was nominated for four Independent Spirit Awards, including Corbine for Best First Feature and Best First Screenplay. The film was released in North America by Vertical Entertainment.

== Filmography ==
=== Film ===
Year	Title	Credited as			Notes
Year	Title	Director	Writer	Producer	Notes
2017	Shinaab	Yes	Yes	Yes	Short
2019	Shinaab, Part II	Yes	Yes	Yes	Short
2021	Wild Indian	Yes	Yes	Yes	
