= Debbie Lum =

American documentary filmmaker

- Education: Brown University (1991); San Francisco State University

Deborah Lum is an American documentary filmmaker based in San Francisco. Her projects frequently explore subject matters within the Asian and Asian American community.

She has had a long working relationship with ITVS.

== Career ==
Lum worked for several years as a film editor for documentary filmmaker Spencer Nakasako. She's been mentored by Nakasako and documentary filmmaker S. Leo Chiang.

Lum directed the documentary short Is Chan Still Missing? (2005) about the making of Chan Is Missing (1982). The short was included on Chan is Missing's 2022 Criterion Collection release.

Lum's debut feature documentary is Seeking Asian Female, a film about an older American man seeking to marry a woman half his age from China that he met online. The film is centered around Lum's perspective as a Chinese American woman, who document's the journey and serves as translator. The project was originally conceived due to Lum's interest in the real life complexities behind the yellow fever phenomenon. In 2002, she was developing a screenplay about a character with yellow fever and conducted research by interviewing people from Craigslist who posted ads seeking Asian women. That's how she met Steven, the subject of Seeking Asian Female, and decided to pivot into filming his relationship with Sandy. Seeking Asian Female was an official selection at the 2012 South by Southwest festival. It won "Best Documentary Feature" at the San Diego Asian Film Festival and "Best of Fest" at the Silverdocs Documentary Festival. Lum won "Best Documentary Director" at the Los Angeles Asian Pacific Film Festival.

Lum acknowledged that the film's focus deviated from yellow fever. She and media strategist Maikiko James later developed the web series and online forum They're All So Beautiful (theyreallsobeautiful.com), looking to engage further discussion around interracial dating and Asian fetish. The companion project to Seeking Asian Female received input from fashion designer Henry Lau and academics such as Elaine H. Kim and Celine Parreñas Shimizu.

Lum is the director and co-producer of the documentary Try Harder!, a film about five high school seniors at the competitive Lowell High School in San Francisco and their college admissions journeys. Production began while Lum was working on a separate documentary about tiger parenting, My Tiger Mom, at Lowell High School. Try Harder! made its world premiere at the 2021 Sundance Film Festival, which was held virtually during the COVID-19 pandemic in the United States. It was selected to open CAAMFest 2021 on May 13, 2021, as a drive-in screening at Fort Mason.

== Personal life ==
Lum was born in Virginia and grew up in St. Louis, Missouri. She graduated from Brown University in 1991. She received her MFA in cinema from San Francisco State University.

Lum is fifth generation Chinese American. She speaks limited Mandarin Chinese.

== Filmography ==
=== Features ===
- Seeking Asian Female (2012)
- Try Harder! (2021)

=== Web series ===
- They're All So Beautiful (2013)

=== Short films ===
- Is Chan Still Missing (2005)
