= Makeup sex =

Sex following making up, after an argument

Makeup sex is an informal term for sexual intercourse which may be experienced after conflict in an intimate personal relationship. These conflicts may range from minor arguments to major arguments. Sex under these circumstances may be more gratifying and invested with additional emotional significance. It is sometimes conceived as a physical expression of reconciliation and rediscovery of one's partner following the cathartic experience of a fight and may resolve underlying conflicts.

Makeup sex has been attributed to increased sexual desires stemming from romantic conflict. After conflict during a relationship, arousal transfer may occur, which shifts anger into arousal. Experts disagree on the outlook of makeup sex, some believe makeup sex is unhealthy as it rewards "fighting, drama, and generally bad behavior". Sexologist and television personality Jessica O'Reilly describes makeup sex as positive, settling conflicts that can only be resolved through sex. Makeup sex may be more intense, as it may assist in releasing underlying emotions.

== In other media ==
The idea of makeup sex has been frequently adapted in books, TV shows, and movies. Additionally, MGK release a song titled "Make Up Sex" with Blackbear on the topic.
