= Ascension (film) =

2021 documentary film by Jessica Kingdon

- Theatrical release poster
- Directed by: Jessica Kingdon
- Produced by: Jessica Kingdon; Kira Simon-Kennedy; Nathan Truesdell
- Cinematography: Jessica Kingdon; Nathan Truesdell
- Edited by: Jessica Kingdon
- Music by: Dan Deacon
- Production companies: XTR; Firelight Media; Field of Vision; Cinereach; Chicken & Egg Pictures; The Sundance Institute; San Francisco Film Society
- Distributed by: MTV Documentary Films
- Release dates: June 12, 2021 (Tribeca); October 8, 2021 (United States)
- Running time: 97 minutes
- Country: United States
- Languages: Mandarin; English
- Box office: $17,200

Ascension (Chinese: 登楼叹; pinyin: Dēnglóu tàn) is a 2021 American documentary film directed and produced by Jessica Kingdon. It follows the pursuit of the Chinese dream through the social classes, prioritizing productivity and innovation.

The film had its world premiere at the Tribeca Film Festival on June 12, 2021, where it won Best Documentary Feature. It was released on October 8, 2021, by MTV Documentary Films.

== Synopsis ==
The film follows the Chinese dream through the social classes, prioritizing productivity and innovation.

== Production ==
Initially, Jessica Kingdon planned on making a trilogy of short films focusing on the cycle of production, consumption and waste, however, it was difficult to secure funding for a series, and instead decided to develop the trilogy into a feature film. Kingdon wanted to make a film about capitalism and how it affects viewers in their own countries, and did not want to specifically single out China. Production on the film took place in 51 locations throughout China. The title of the film originates from a poem written by Jessica Kingdon's great-grandfather.

== Release ==
The film had its world premiere at the Tribeca Film Festival on June 12, 2021, where it won Best Documentary Feature and the Albert Maysles Award for Best New Documentary Director. On September 26, 2021, the film had its European premiere at the Zurich Film Festival, where it was entered in the competition for best documentary film.

In August 2021, it was announced MTV Documentary Films had acquired distribution rights to the film, and set it for an October 8, 2021, release.

== Reception ==
=== Critical reception ===
Ascension received positive reviews from film critics. On Rotten Tomatoes it has a 98% approval rating based on reviews from 49 critics, with an average rating of 7.90/10. On Metacritic, the film holds a rating of 84 out of 100, based on 13 critics, indicating "universal acclaim".

=== Accolades ===
Award	Date of ceremony	Category	Recipient(s)	Result	Ref.
Academy Awards	March 27, 2022	Best Documentary Feature	Jessica Kingdon, Kira Simon-Kennedy, and Nathan Truesdell	Nominated	
Alliance of Women Film Journalists Awards	January 25, 2022	Best Documentary	Ascension	Nominated	
Cinema Eye Honors	March 1, 2022	Outstanding Non-Fiction Feature Feature	Jessica Kingdon, Kira Simon-Kennedy, and Nathan Truesdell	Nominated	
Cinema Eye Honors	March 1, 2022	Outstanding Direction	Jessica Kingdon	Nominated	
Cinema Eye Honors	March 1, 2022	Outstanding Debut	Jessica Kingdon	Won	
Cinema Eye Honors	March 1, 2022	Outstanding Cinematography	Jessica Kingdon and Nathan Truesdell	Won	
Cinema Eye Honors	March 1, 2022	Outstanding Original Score	Dan Deacon	Won	
Critics' Choice Documentary Awards	November 14, 2021	Best Documentary Feature	Ascension	Nominated	
Critics' Choice Documentary Awards	November 14, 2021	Best Director	Jessica Kingdon	Nominated	
Critics' Choice Documentary Awards	November 14, 2021	Best First Documentary Feature	Jessica Kingdon	Nominated	
Critics' Choice Documentary Awards	November 14, 2021	Best Score	Dan Deacon	Nominated	
Critics' Choice Documentary Awards	November 14, 2021	Best Cinematography	Jessica Kingdon and Nathan Truesdell	Nominated	
Critics' Choice Documentary Awards	November 14, 2021	Best Editing	Jessica Kingdon	Nominated	
Denver Film Festival	November 15, 2021	Special Mention Best Documentary	Ascension	Won	
Directors Guild of America Awards	March 12, 2022	Outstanding Directorial Achievement in Documentaries	Jessica Kingdon	Nominated	
Gotham Awards	November 29, 2021	Best Documentary	Ascension	Nominated	
Hamptons International Film Festival	October 11, 2021	Best Documentary Feature	Ascension	Won	
IDA Documentary Awards	March 4, 2022	Best Cinematography	Jessica Kingdon and Nathan Truesdell	Nominated	
Independent Spirit Awards	March 6, 2022	Best Documentary Feature	Jessica Kingdon, Kira Simon-Kennedy, and Nathan Truesdell	Nominated	
National Board of Review Awards	December 2, 2021	Top 5 Documentaries	Ascension	Won	
Producers Guild of America Awards	March 19, 2022	Outstanding Producer of Documentary Motion Pictures	Jessica Kingdon, Kira Simon-Kennedy, and Nathan Truesdell	Nominated	
Satellite Awards	April 2, 2022	Best Motion Picture, Documentary	Ascension	Nominated	
Tribeca Film Festival	June 24, 2021	Best Documentary Feature	Ascension	Won	
Tribeca Film Festival	June 24, 2021	Albert Maysles Award	Jessica Kingdon	Won	
