= Listening to Kenny G =

2021 American documentary film

- Promotional release poster
- Directed by: Penny Lane
- Produced by: Gabriel Sedgwick
- Starring: Kenny Gorelick; Clive Davis; James Gardiner
- Cinematography: Naiti Gámez
- Edited by: Adam Bolt; Cindy Lee
- Music by: Charlie Rosen
- Production companies: HBO Documentary Films; Ringer Films
- Distributed by: HBO
- Release dates: September 11, 2021 (TIFF); December 2, 2021 (HBO)
- Running time: 97 minutes
- Country: United States
- Language: English

Listening to Kenny G is a 2021 American documentary film, directed by Penny Lane. It is about the jazz musician Kenny G.

== Production ==
Initially, Bill Simmons, the creator of HBO’s Music Box series, invited Penny Lane to make a music documentary. Lane chose Kenny G as the subject of the film because he is "a musician who is objectively popular, by way of record sales, but is also hated by the 'critical class'." Kenny G himself had no control of the content of the film.

== Release ==
Listening to Kenny G premiered at the 2021 Toronto International Film Festival. The film screened at the Hamptons International Film Festival. It aired on HBO as part of Bill Simmons' Music Box anthology. It debuted on December 2, 2021 on HBO and was also available to stream on HBO Max. It was screened as the opening night film at DOC NYC 2021. It was released on December 11, 2021 on Binge in Australia.

== Reception ==
The New Yorker listed Listening to Kenny G as one of the best films of 2021. Richard Brody of The New Yorker wrote, "By listening attentively to Kenny G, Lane delivers, in a buoyant, amiable way, a ferocious denunciation, one in which she herself doesn't voice a negative word—because he does most of the inadvertent, unconscious damning."

Glenn Kenny of The New York Times wrote, "The movie's animating question is why a musician who has brought an abundance of pleasure to so many listeners makes so many others almost incoherently angry. Some interviewees, including Kenny G himself, imply that judgments against his work are de facto judgments of the people who love it. That's a specious conclusion, one which the movie could have unpacked better."
