= Try Harder! =

- Theatrical release poster
- Directed by: Debbie Lum
- Produced by: Debbie Lum; Lou Nakasako; Nico Opper
- Cinematography: Kathy Huang; Lou Nakasako
- Edited by: Amy Ferraris; Andrew Gersh
- Music by: Diana Salier
- Production companies: ITVS; Center for Asian American Media; California Humanities; XTR
- Distributed by: Greenwich Entertainment
- Release dates: January 30, 2021 (Sundance); December 3, 2021
- Running time: 85 minutes
- Country: United States
- Language: English
- Box office: $32,432

Try Harder! is a 2021 American documentary film, directed and produced by Debbie Lum. It follows students at Lowell High School as they apply and hope for admission to the college of their dreams.

It had its world premiere at the Sundance Film Festival on January 30, 2021. It was released on December 3, 2021, by Greenwich Entertainment.

== Synopsis ==
Students at Lowell High School apply and hope for admission to the college of their dreams.

== Release ==
The film had its world premiere at the Sundance Film Festival on January 30, 2021. It also screened at the Full Frame Documentary Film Festival on June 2, 2021. It also screened at AFI Docs in June 2021. In August 2021, Greenwich Entertainment acquired distribution rights to the film. It was released on December 3, 2021. The film also aired on Independent Lens on PBS on May 2, 2022.

== Reception ==
=== Box office ===
In its opening weekend, the film earned $27,815 from 5 theaters.

=== Critical response ===
Try Harder received positive reviews from film critics. Metacritic, which uses a weighted average, assigned the film a score of 75 out of 100, based on 4 critics, indicating "generally favorable" reviews. On the review aggregator website Rotten Tomatoes, 97% of 38 critics' reviews are positive, with an average rating of 7.60/10. The website's consensus reads: "Straightforward and disarmingly, charmingly sincere, Try Harder! follows college-bound students through their final year of high school"
