= Angelo Madsen Minax =

American film director

Angelo Madsen (born 1983) is an American filmmaker and interdisciplinary artist.

== Life and career ==
Angelo Madsen (previously known as Madsen Minax or Angelo Madsen Minax 2005–2024) was born in Petoskey, Michigan in the US in 1983. He studied art at the School of the Art Institute of Chicago and at Northwestern University. He is an associate professor of time-based media at the University of Vermont.

Madsen works in documentary, fiction and hybrid film forms, sound and music performances, text and media installations. Madsen's films deal with themes of love and death, and punk, queer, rural, and activist cultures. North by Current, an auto-ethnographic film about death, grief, and trans identity features home movies from the 1960s–1980s as well as footage shot by Madsen between 2016 and 2020. The experimental documentary is narrated both by Madsen and The Child, a character who can be interpreted as Madsen's dead niece, his younger self, or a more distant observer. North by Current premiered internationally at the 2021 Berlinale, in the U.S. at the 2021 Tribeca Film Festival, and has screened nationally and internationally.

Madsen has also presented films at the European Media Art Festival, the Anthology Film Archives in New York and at numerous other film festivals. His work has been on view at the Museum of Contemporary Art Chicago, the Leslie Lohman Museum, and the Museum of Fine Arts Houston.

In 2022, Madsen was awarded a Guggenheim Fellowship in Film-Video. In 2023 he was named a United States Artists (USA) fellow.

== Filmography ==
- A Body To Live In (2025)
- One Night At Babes (2024)
- Bigger on the Inside (2022)
- North By Current (2021)
- Two Sons and a River of Blood (2021) (with Amber Bemak)
- At the River (2020)
- The Eddies (2018)
- Because of Us (2018)
- Kairos Dirt & the Errant Vacuum (2017)
- The Source is a Hole (2017)
- Separation of the Earth (By Fire)
- My Most Handsome Monster (2014)
- Forward Into the Afternoon (2014)
- The Year I Broke My Voice (2012)
- Riot Acts: Flaunting Gender Deviance in Music Performance (2010)
