= Jessica Kingdon =

Chinese American director and producer

- Education: Columbia University (BA); The New School (MA)
- Occupations: documentary filmmaker, producer
- Spouse: Nathan Truesdell
- Parents: Mark E. Kingdon (father); Anla Cheng (mother)

Jessica Kingdon is a Chinese American director and producer. She was nominated for the 2022 Academy Award for Best Documentary Feature for directing the documentary Ascension.

== Career ==
Kingdon received her BA from Columbia University in 2009 and her MA in media studies from The New School in 2014.

She directed the 2017 documentary Commodity City, which focuses on the lives of Chinese wholesalers in Yiwu International Trade City, the world's largest wholesale market. The documentary won Best Documentary Short in the 2018 Ashland Independent Film Festival.

Her documentary, Ascension, looks at China's growing economic progress and increasing economic divide against the backdrop of the pursuit of the Chinese Dream. The film had its world premiere at the Tribeca Film Festival on June 12, 2021, and received critical acclaim. The film was nominated for an Academy Award, a Gotham Award, five Cinema Eye Honors, a Directors Guild of America Award, a Producers Guild of America Award, and six Critics' Choice Documentary Awards. The Chinese title of the documentary was inspired by a 1912 poem written by her great-great-grandfather, a member of the South Society who participated in the 1911 Revolution.

Kingdon was named one of the "25 new faces of independent film" by Filmmaker magazine. She was also named to the 2020 "40 under 40" list by Doc NYC.

== Personal life ==
Kingdon is the daughter of hedge fund manager Mark E. Kingdon and financier Anla Cheng, who is a member of the Committee of 100. Her father is Jewish and her mother is Chinese.

Kingdon is married to filmmaker Nathan Truesdell.
