= Jessica Beshir =

Ethiopian-Mexican filmmaker (born 1988)

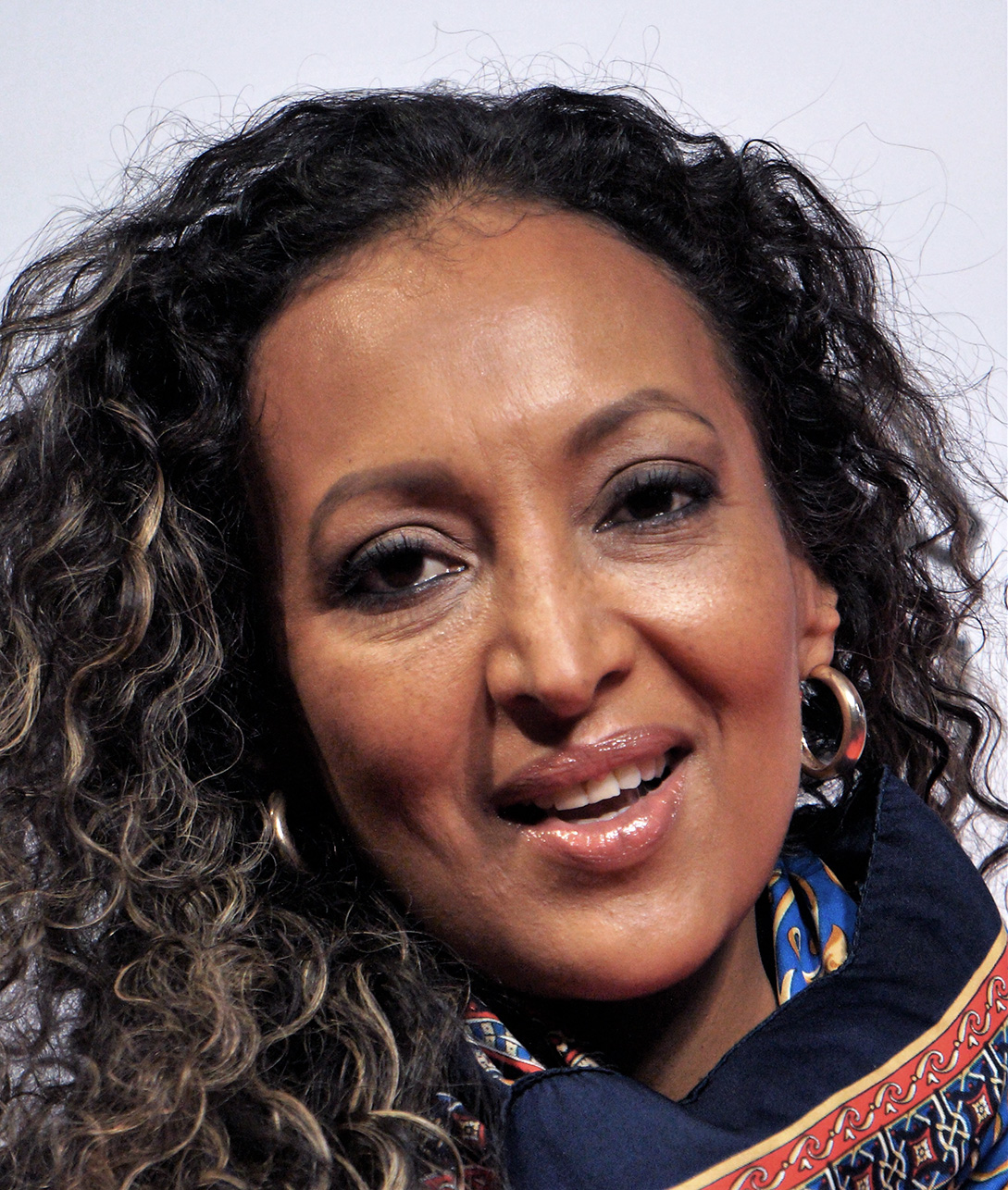
- Beshir in 2021
- Born: 1988 (age 37–38); Mexico City, Distrito Federal, Mexico
- Education: University of California, Los Angeles
- Occupation: Film director
- Awards: Guggenheim Fellowship (2024)

Jessica Beshir (born 1988) is a Mexican documentary filmmaker. After directing several documentary shorts, she made her feature film debut with Faya Dayi (2021) which she won several awards for.

== Biography ==
Jessica Beshir was born in 1988 in Mexico City, the daughter of a Mexican mother and an Ethiopian father who was studying medicine in the country. Due to the government calling for the repatriation of the diaspora following the Ethiopian Civil War, her father brought the family to Harar, Ethiopia, where Beshir grew up, and worked as a surgeon in the country. When she was about sixteen, the family fled Ethiopia and returned to Mexico when her father got a scholarship. She obtained her BA in film studies and literature from the University of California, Los Angeles. Jessica is based in Brooklyn, NY.

Her documentary short film He Who Dances on Wood (2016) is about a man, Fred Nelson, who practices tap dancing on a block of wood in a tunnel in Prospect Park, an urban park in Brooklyn. In 2017, the film was awarded Best Documentary Short at the Edmonton International Film Festival and the Jury Award at the Anchorage International Film Festival. Her documentary short Hairat (2017) is about Abba Yussuf, the "Hyena Man of Harar" who came to international attention through the documentary series Planet Earth II. Hairat premiered at the Sundance Film Festival, and it was shown at the 2018 Garden State Film Festival.

In 2021, she made her feature film directorial debut with Faya Dayi. She says "Me and the making of this film were one. It taught me about who I was. Nobody was interested in doing it [with me]. I realized I am the one who needs to do it, so I better learn how to use a camera, and I better learn how to produce. It was a call to develop myself, and in reconnecting with this land that I had left for a long time, I came to learn its history, and came to learn and listen to what the communities were talking about and to understand the struggles they were grappling with at the moment, especially politically." The complexity of the human experience is explored and underrepresented perspectives are frequently highlighted in Jessica Beshir's work. She uses a lyrical visual language in her films to elicit strong emotional reactions from her viewers. Focusing on topics like migration, family, and cultural legacy, Beshir's documentaries offer a complex look at the lives of people who are frequently underrepresented in the media. She won an American Society of Cinematographers Documentary Award, the Independent Spirit Awards Truer Than Fiction Award, and two Visions du Réel awards for the film, which was also shortlisted for Academy Award for Best Documentary Feature Film and aired on POV on 29 August 2022. In 2024, she was awarded a Guggenheim Fellowship in Film and Video. Jane Steiner Hoffman and Michael Hoffman donated funds for Jessica Beshir to be a 2024 Hoffman Visiting Artist for Documentary Media, a brief filmmaker residency at Northwestern's School of Communications.

Beshir lives in Brooklyn.

== Filmography ==
Year	Work	Note	Ref
2016	He Who Dances on Wood	As director; documentary short	
2017	Hairat	As director; documentary short	
2017	Heroin	As director, screenwriter, executive producer, producer, and additional cinematography; documentary short	
2017	The Gift	Television miniseries	
2018	Kings		
2021	Faya Dayi	As director, executive producer, producer, writer, cinematographer; documentary feature film	

== Awards and nominations ==
Year	Award	Category	Recipient	Results	Ref
2017	Anchorage International Film Festival	Jury Award	He Who Dances on Wood	Won	
2017	Edmonton International Film Festival	Best Documentary Short	He Who Dances on Wood	Won	
2017	Sundance Film Festival	Short Film Grand Jury Prize	Hairat	Nominated	
2021	Academy Awards	Best Documentary Feature Film	Faya Dayi	Shortlisted	
2021	Black Reel Award	Best Foreign Language Film	Faya Dayi	Nominated	
2021	Cinema Eye Honors	Outstanding Non-Fiction Feature	Faya Dayi	Nominated	
2021	Cinema Eye Honors	Outstanding Direction	Faya Dayi	Nominated	
2021	Cinema Eye Honors	Outstanding Cinematography	Faya Dayi	Nominated	
2021	Cinema Eye Honors	Outstanding Debut	Faya Dayi	Nominated	
2021	Critics' Choice Documentary Awards	Best Cinematography	Faya Dayi	Nominated	
2021	Critics' Choice Documentary Awards	Best First Documentary Feature	Faya Dayi	Nominated	
2021	Gotham Awards	Best Documentary	Faya Dayi	Nominated	
2021	Visions du Réel	Grand Jury Prize	Faya Dayi	Won	
2021	Visions du Réel	Fipresci International Critics Award	Faya Dayi	Won	
2022	American Society of Cinematographers Awards	Documentary Award	Faya Dayi	Won	
2022	Independent Spirit Awards	The Truer Than Fiction Award	Faya Dayi	Won	Her short film "Hairat," which debuted at the 2017 Sundance Film Festival, marked her directorial debut.
