= Test Pattern (film) =

2019 film by Shatara Michelle Ford

- Release poster
- Directed by: Shatara Michelle Ford
- Written by: Shatara Michelle Ford
- Produced by: Pin-Chun Liu; Shatara Michelle Ford; Yu-Hao Su
- Starring: Brittany S. Hall; Will Brill; Gail Bean; Drew Fuller
- Cinematography: Ludovica Isidori
- Edited by: Matt Tassone; Katy Miller
- Music by: Lia Ouyang Rusli
- Production company: 120E Films
- Distributed by: Kino Lorber
- Release dates: August 4, 2019 (BlackStar); February 19, 2021
- Running time: 82 minutes
- Country: United States
- Language: English

Test Pattern is a 2019 American drama film written, directed, and produced by Shatara Michelle Ford (in their feature directorial debut). The film stars Brittany S. Hall, Will Brill, Gail Bean, and Drew Fuller. It follows an interracial couple whose relationship is put to the test after a black woman is sexually assaulted and her white boyfriend drives her from hospital to hospital in search of a rape kit.

Test Pattern had its premiere at the 8th BlackStar Film Festival on August 4, 2019 and was released by Kino Lorber on February 19, 2021. The film received positive reviews from critics. Among other accolades, it was nominated for three Gotham Awards and three Independent Spirit Awards.

== Summary ==
Renesha Bell is a beautiful black woman who, while out with her friends, is approached by Evan, a white man who asks for her number. Evan is a tattoo artist while Renesha works in the corporate world. They hit it off and quickly fall in love. Evan inspires Renesha to get more tattoos, quit her job and begin working with a non-profit doing more socially conscious work.

On a girls' night out Renesha and her friend Amber are approached by two men celebrating a business deal. After being pressured to drink and take a marijuana edible and then dance with them, Renesha blacks out and reawakens in a hotel room with one of the men.

The following morning Renesha is dropped off at Amber's by the same man from the hotel only to find Evan waiting there. Renesha struggles to comprehend what has happened. Evan suggests they go to a hospital to have a rape kit administered. After waiting for two hours they are told the hospital lacks a qualified nurse to administer the test. Renesha is nevertheless obligated to pay for the visit.

Though Renesha wants to go home, Evan continues to take her from hospital to hospital looking for a qualified nurse. When he calls the police to report the rape against her will, he and Renesha fight.

Eventually they find a hospital willing to administer the rape kit. Afterwards Evan and Renesha go home and Renesha admits she does not know how she feels. She finally breaks down crying while alone in the bathtub and then takes out her braids and cuts her hair.

Two days later, at work Renesha receives a call from the police informing her that her case is being closed for lack of evidence. Upset, she returns home.

== Reception ==
The film received positive reviews with Variety naming it a "A Shrewd, Socially Penetrating Relationship Drama". Slant praised the film for its "Genre-Straddling Exploration of Sex, Race, and Power". The Hollywood Reporter called it a "staggeringly impressive debut, blending color, sound and story to create an intricate emotional tapestry". The Los Angeles Times singled out the film's "compelling ambiguity".

It had a 95% rating on review aggregator site Rotten Tomatoes indicating overall positive reviews. The site's critical consensus reads, "Test Pattern surveys the aftermath of a woman's assault—and uncovers the many ways in which personal trauma can be compounded by systemic injustice."
