= Faya Dayi =

2021 film by Jessica Beshir

- Directed by: Jessica Beshir
- Written by: Jessica Beshir
- Produced by: Jessica Beshir
- Cinematography: Jessica Beshir
- Edited by: Jeanne Applegate; Dustin Waldman
- Production companies: XTR; JustFilms/Ford Foundation; Merkhana Films; Neon Heart Productions; Files Collective; The Open Society Foundation; The Jerome Foundation; Doha Film Institute
- Distributed by: Janus Films (United States)
- Release dates: January 30, 2021 (Sundance); September 3, 2021 (United States)
- Running time: 118 minutes
- Countries: United States; Ethiopia; Qatar
- Languages: Oromifa; Harari; Amharic

Faya Dayi is a 2021 American-Ethiopian documentary film, directed, written, starring and produced by Jessica Beshir. It explores the rituals of khat, a psychoactive plant that plays an important role in Ethiopia's economy and culture.

The film had its world premiere at the Sundance Film Festival on January 30, 2021. It was released on September 3, 2021, by Janus Films.

== Synopsis ==
The film explores the religious rituals of khat chewing in Harar.

== Release ==
The film had its world premiere at the Sundance Film Festival documentary competition on January 30, 2021.

In April 2021, Janus Films acquired U.S. distribution rights to the film, with Mubi acquiring distribution rights in the U.K., Ireland, Latin America, Italy, France, Germany, Turkey and India. It was released in the USA on September 3, 2021.

== Reception ==
Faya Dayi received positive reviews from film critics. It holds a 91% approval rating on review aggregator website Rotten Tomatoes, based on 11 reviews, with a weighted average of 8.10/10.
