= Schedule of the 2000 Democratic National Convention =

The 2000 Democratic National Convention was held August 14–17, 2000, in Los Angeles. The convention's general sessions were held at the Staples Center. The convention marked the Democratic Party's formal nomination of Al Gore as its presidential nominee in the 2000 United States presidential election and Joe Lieberman and its vice presidential nominee.

== Logistics ==
=== Date selection ===
Since the mid-20th century or earlier, it has been tradition for the party of the incumbent president to hold their convention after that of the other major party. In 2000, Republicans held their convention July 31 through August 3.

On April 16, 1999 Chair of the Democratic National Committee Joe Andrew announced that the convention would take place August 14–17.

=== Official themes ===
Each day of the convention was assigned a theme:

- The first day's theme was "Prosperity and Progress", highlighting the economic progress that had occurred under the Clinton–Gore administration.
- The second day's theme was "New Heights: You Ain't Seen Nothing Yet", focusing on the potential of the future if proper decisions are carried out by new leadership.
- The third day's theme was "Al Gore: The Principled Fighter", highlighting Al Gore's life story.
- The fourth day's theme was "Al Gore's vision for the future".

== Monday, August 14 ==
The highlight of the first night of the convention was a speech given by President Bill Clinton.

=== Speakers (August 14) ===
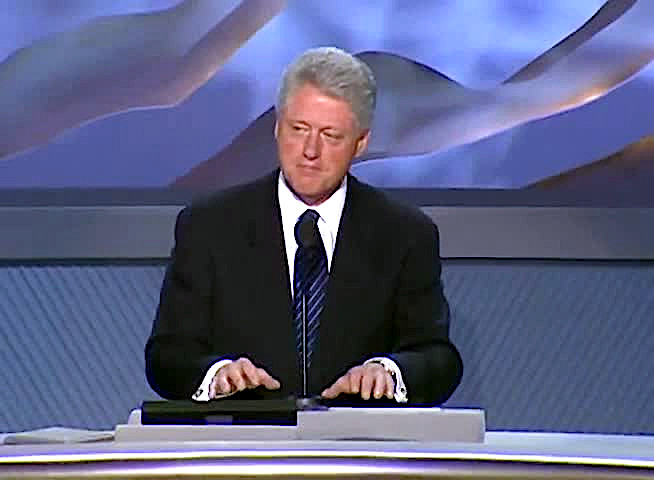
President Bill Clinton speaking at the convention

- Joe Andrew, chair of the Democratic National Committee
- Dennis Archer, mayor of Detroit
- Barbara Boxer, United States senator from California
- Joseph Cari Jr., national finance co-chair of the Democratic National Committee
- Linda Chavez-Thompson, vice chair of the Democratic National Committee and executive vice president of the AFL–CIO
- Bill Clinton, president of the United States
- Hillary Clinton, first lady of the United States and Democratic nominee for United States Senate in New York
- Michael B. Coleman, mayor of Columbus, Ohio
- Gray Davis, governor of California
- Judi Dutcher, Minnesota state auditor
- Dianne Feinstein, United States senator from California
- Ron Gonzales, mayor of San Jose
- Steny Hoyer, United States congressman from Maryland
- Joel Hyatt, national finance co-chair of the Democratic National Committee
- Patrick J. Kennedy, United States congressman from Rhode Island
- Mary Landrieu, United States senator from Louisiana
- Blanche Lincoln, United States senator from Arkansas
- Gary Locke, governor of Washington
- Tim Leiweke, CEO and president of Anschutz Entertainment Group
- Alexis Herman, United States secretary of labor
- Roger Mahony, Roman Catholic archdiocese of Los Angeles (invocation)
- Dannel Malloy, mayor of Stamford, Connecticut and chair of the National Democratic Municipal Officials Conference
- Terry McAuliffe, chair of the convention
- Joan Menard, member of the Massachusetts House of Representatives
- Gloria Molina, member of the Los Angeles County Board of Supervisors
- Marc Morial, mayor of New Orleans
- Thomas V. Miller Jr., president of the Maryland Senate
- Patty Murray, United States Senator from Washington
- Bill Nelson, Florida insurance commissioner and nominee for United States Senate in Florida
- Paul E. Patton, governor of Kentucky
- Richard Riordan, mayor of Los Angeles
- Lottie Shackelford, vice chair of the Democratic National Committee and former mayor of Little Rock, Arkansas
- Jeanne Shaheen, governor of New Hampshire
- Debbie Stabenow, United States congresswoman from Michigan and candidate for United States Senate in Michigan
- Andrew Tobias, treasured of the Democratic National Committee
- Robert Torricelli, United States Senator from New Jersey
- Art Torres, chair of the California Democratic Party and former California state senator
- Wellington Webb, mayor of Denver
- Lynn Woolsey, United States congresswoman from California

=== Performers (August 14) ===
- Craig Bierko and the Broadway cast of The Music Man: "76 Trombones"
- Melissa Etheridge: "America the Beautiful"

== Tuesday, August 15 ==
=== Speakers (August 15) ===
- Joe Andrew, chair of the Democratic National Committee
- Tammy Baldwin, United States congresswoman from Wisconsin
- Evan Bayh, United States Senator from Indiana and former governor of Indiana
- Sharon Sayles Belton, mayor of Minneapolis
- Yvonne Braithwaite Burke, member of the Los Angeles County Board of Supervisors
- Elizabeth Birch, executive director of the Human Rights Campaign
- Earl Blumenauer, United States congressman from Oregon
- Bill Bradley, former United States Senator from New Jersey and candidate for the 2000 Democratic presidential nomination
- Bob Butterworth, Florida attorney general
- Tom Carper, governor of Delaware and Democratic nominee for United States Senate in Delaware
- Suzan Johnson Cook, reverend
- Tom Daschle, United States Senate minority leader
- Jim Davis, United States congressman from Florida
- Howard Dean, governor of Vermont
- Norman Dicks, United States congressman from California
- Jim Doyle, attorney general of Wisconsin
- John Edwards, United States Senator from North Carolina
- María Elena Durazo, trade union activist
- Dick Durbin, United States senator from Illinois
- C. Jack Ellis, mayor of Macon, Georgia
- Martha Escutia, California state senator
- Russ Feingold, United States Senator from Wisconsin
- Harold Ford Jr., United States congressman from Tennessee keynote speaker
- Jane Harman, former United States congresswoman from California and nominee for United States congress from California
- Maher Hathout (invocation)
- James Hunt Jr., governor of North Carolina
- Jay Inslee, United States congressman from Washington
- Daniel Inouye, United States Senator from Hawaii
- Jesse Jackson, president and CEO of Rainbow/PUSH, former United States shadow senator from the District of Columbia; candidate for the 1984 and 1988 Democratic presidential nominations
- Eddie Bernice Johnson, United States congresswoman from Texas
- Patty Judge, Secretary of agriculture of Iowa
- Robert F. Kennedy Jr., attorney
- Ted Kennedy, United States senator from Massachusetts
- Nita Lowey, United States congresswoman from New York
- Martin Meehan, United States congressman from Massachusetts
- Thomas Menino, mayor of Boston
- Terry McAuliffe, chair of the convention
- Gerald McEntee, president of AFSCME
- Kate Michelman, president of NARAL
- Tom Miller, attorney general of Iowa
- Norman Mineta, United States secretary of commerce
- Eleanor Holmes Norton, non-voting delegate to the United States House of Representatives
- Grace Napolitano, United States congresswoman from California
- Janet Napolitano, attorney general of Arizona
- Edward James Olmos, actor
- Bill Purcell, mayor of Nashville
- Jack Reed, United States Senator from Rhode Island
- Charles Rangel, United States congressman from New York
- Ed Rendell, general chair of the Democratic National Committee and former mayor of Philadelphia
- Hans Reimer, founder of the 2030 Center
- Tim Roemer, United States congressman from Indiana
- Pedro Rossello, governor of Puerto Rico
- Lucille Roybal-Allard, United States congresswoman from California
- Raymond G. Sanchez, speaker of the New Mexico House of Representatives
- Caroline Kennedy Schlossberg, daughter of former president John F. Kennedy
- Karen Thurman, United States congresswoman from Florida
- Kathleen Kennedy Townsend, lieutenant governor of Maryland
- Richard Trumka, secretary-treasurer of the AFL–CIO
- David Wu, United States congressman from Oregon

=== Performers (August 15) ===
- Pat Morita: "The Star-Spangled Banner"
- Los Lobos
- Jenny Powers: "The Star-Spangled Banner"
- Luther Vandross, "America...The Dream Goes On"

== Wednesday, August 16 ==
=== Presidential nominating roll call ===
The presidential roll call vote formally nominating Gore for president took place during the August 16 general session of the convention.

=== Speakers (August 16) ===
- Archbishop Demetrios of America (invocation)
- Tom Allen, United States congressman from Maine
- Thurbert Baker, attorney general of Georgia
- Shelley Berkley, United States congresswoman from Nevada
- Sanford Bishop, United States congressman from Georgia
- Elaine Bloom, former speaker pro tempore of the Florida House of Representatives; nominee for United States Senate in Florida
- Leonard Boswell, United States congressman from Iowa
- Lee Brown, mayor of Houston
- Raymond Buckley, member of the New Hampshire House of Representatives
- Troy D. Brown, nominee for United States Senate in Mississippi
- Willie Brown, mayor of San Francisco and former speaker of the California Assembly
- Mel Carnahan, governor of Missouri and Democratic nominee for United States Senate in Missouri
- Bob Chase, president of the National Education Association
- Max Cleland, United States Senator from Georgia
- Jim Clyburn, United States congressman from South Carolina
- Jon Corzine, candidate for the United States Senate in New Jersey
- Gray Davis, governor of California
- Lois DeBerry, speaker pro tempore of the Tennessee General Assembly (nominating speech for Al Gore)
- Rosa DeLauro, United States congresswoman from Connecticut
- Nelson Diaz, former judge of the Philadelphia Court of Common Pleas
- Al Edwards, member of the Texas House of Representatives
- Lane Evans, United States congressman from Illinois
- Jack Ford, Democratic leader of the Ohio House of Representatives
- Wayne Ford, member of the Iowa House of Representatives
- Karen Freeman-Wilson, Indiana attorney general
- Martin Frost, United States congressman from Texas
- Domingo Garcia, member of the Texas House of Representatives
- Sam Gejdenson, United States congressman from Connecticut
- Dick Gephardt, minority leader of the United States House of Representatives
- Parris Glendening, governor of Maryland
- Charlie Gonzalez, United States congressman from Texas
- Bart Gordon, United States congressman from Tennessee
- Christine Gregoire, attorney general of Washington
- Clarence Harmon, mayor of St. Louis
- Dario Herrera, member of the Clark County Commission and former member of the Nevada Assembly
- Robert Hertzberg, speaker of the California State Assembly
- Joe Hoeffel, United States congressman from Pennsylvania
- Rush Holt, United States congressman from New Jersey
- Mike Honda, member of the California State Assembly and candidate for the United States House of Representatives
- William J. Jefferson, United States congressman from Louisiana
- Stephanie Tubbs Jones, United States congresswoman from Ohio
- Tommy Lee Jones, actor (nominating speech for Al Gore)
- Eleanor Jordan, member of the Kentucky General Assembly and candidate for the United States House of Representatives
- Kwame Kilpatrick, Democratic floor leader of the Michigan House of Representatives
- Ron Klink, United States congressman from Pennsylvania and candidate for the United States Senate in Pennsylvania
- John Lewis, United States congressman from Georgia
- Hadassah Lieberman, spouse of vice presidential nominee (introduction for VP nomination acceptance speech)
- Joe Lieberman, vice presidential nominee (VP nomination acceptance speech)
- Zoe Lofgren, United States congresswoman from California
- Ellen Malcolm, president of EMILY's List
- Carolyn Maloney, United States congresswoman from New York
- Carrie Meek, United States congresswoman from Florida
- Bob Menendez, United States congressman from New Jersey
- Juanita Millender-McDonald, United States congresswoman from California
- Jonathan Miller, Kentucky state treasurer
- Renee Mullins, daughter of James Byrd Jr.
- Carolyn Maloney, United States congresswoman from New York
- Robert Matsui, United States congressman from California
- H. Carl McCall, New York state comptroller
- Nancy Pelosi, United States congresswoman from California
- Roberto Ramirez, member of the New York Assembly
- John D. Rockefeller, United States Senator from West Virginia
- Chuck Robb, United States Senator from Virginia
- Robert Rubin, former United States secretary of the treasury
- Chuck Schumer, United States Senator from New York
- Dennis Shepard and Judy Shepard, parents of Matthew Shepard
- Karenna Gore Schiff, daughter of the presidential nominee (nominating speech for Al Gore)
- Jimmy Smits, actor
- Andy Stern, president of the Service Employees International Union
- John F. Street, mayor of Philadelphia
- Bart Stupak, United States congressman from Michigan
- John Sweeney, president of the AFL–CIO
- John S. Tanner, United States congressman from Tennessee
- Antonio Villaraigosa, former speaker of the California State Assembly

=== Performers (August 16) ===
- Mary Chapin Carpenter: "Why Walk When You Can Fly"
- Plus One: "The Star-Spangled Banner" and "America the Beautiful"
- Stevie Wonder and Diane Schuur: "The Star-Spangled Banner"

== Thursday, August 17 ==
=== Nomination of Lieberman for vice president ===
Despite Lieberman having already delivered his acceptance speech of the vice presidential nomination the previous evening, he was not formally nominated until a vote on the final evening of the convention (being nominated by acclamation)

=== Speakers (August 17) ===
- Michela Alioto, 1998 nominee for Secretary of state of California
- Yvonne Atkinson-Gates, chair of the Clark County Commission
- Joe Biden, United States senator from Delaware and candidate for the 1988 Democratic presidential nomination, and eventual 46th President of the United States
- David Bonior, United States House of Representatives Democratic Whip
- John Breaux, United States Senator from Louisiana
- Willie Brown, mayor of San Francisco and former speaker of the California Assembly
- Cruz Bustamante, lieutenant governor of California
- Lois Capps, United States congresswoman from California
- Bob Casey Jr., Pennsylvania auditor general
- John Conyers, United States congressman from Michigan
- Andrew Cuomo, United States Secretary of Housing and Urban Development
- Susan Davis, candidate for United States House of Representatives in California
- Jane Dixon, bishop of the Episcopal Church in the United States of America
- Chris Dodd, United States Senator from Connecticut
- Cal Dooley, United States congressman from California
- Byron Dorgon, United States Senator from North Dakota
- Sandra Feldman, president of the American Federation of Teachers
- Mario Gallegos Jr., Texas state senator
- Dan Glickman, United States Secretary of Agriculture
- Al Gore, presidential nominee (presidential nomination acceptance speech)
- Kristin Gore, daughter of presidential nominee
- Tipper Gore, wife of presidential nominee (speech by spouse of the presidential nominee)
- Jennifer Granholm, candidate for Michigan attorney general
- Barney Frank, United States congressman from Massachusetts
- David Halberstam, journalist
- Tom Harkin, United States senator from Iowa and candidate for the 1992 Democratic presidential nomination
- Tony P. Hall, United States congressman from Ohio
- Thelma Harper (politician), Tennessee state senator
- Frank W. Hunger, former United States assistant attorney general for the civil division and uncle of the presidential nominee
- Sheila Kuehl, member of the California State Assembly
- Martin Luther King III, president of the Southern Christian Leadership Conference
- Mark Lawrence, president of the Maine Senate and nominee for United States Senate in Maine
- Sheila Jackson Lee, United States congresswoman from Texas
- Pat Leahy, United States Senator from Vermont
- Susan Bass Levin, candidate for United States House of Representatives in New Jersey
- Bill Luther, United States congressman from Minnesota
- Patricia Madrid, attorney general of New Mexico
- Jim Maloney, United States congressman from Connecticut
- Jack Markell, Delaware state treasurer
- Frank Mascara, United States congressman from Pennsylvania
- Sue Masten, president of the National Council of American Indians
- Vashti Murphy McKenzie, African Methodist Episcopal Church bishop (invocation)
- Kendrick Meek, Florida state senator
- Kweisi Mfume, president of the NAACP and former United States congressman from Maryland
- Harry Reid, United States Senate Democratic Whip
- Barbara Mikulski, United States Senator from Maryland
- Jan Schakowsky, United States congresswoman from Illinois
- Brian Schweitzer, candidate for United States Senate in Montana
- Louise Slaughter, United States congresswoman from New York
- Hilda Solis, California state senator and candidate for the United States House of Representatives from California
- John Spratt, United States congressman from South Carolina
- Susan Turnbull, chair of the Democratic National Committee women's caucus
- Robert A. Underwood, non-voting delegate to the United States House of Representatives from Guam
- Nydia Velázquez, United States congresswoman from New York
- Tom Vilsack, governor of Iowa
- Maxine Waters, United States congresswoman from California

=== Performers (August 17) ===
- Boyz II Men: "The Star-Spangled Banner"
- Christie Brinkley: "Pledge of Allegiance"
- Phil Driscoll: "Battle Hymn of the Republic"
- Mark O'Connor, "Orange Blossom Special"

=== Balloon drop ===
After the acceptance speech by Gore, a traditional convention-closing balloon drop took place. The balloon drop was orchestrated by Kelli Sipp, who partnered with Treb Heining. Heining, who orchestrated the Republican National Convention balloon drop that year, also had past experience that included orchestrating the balloon drops at the previous three Republican National Conventions. Heining oversaw the mechanical aspects of the Democratic balloon drop.

== See also ==
- Schedule of the 2000 Republican National Convention
- 2000 Democratic National Convention protest activity
