= Schedule of the 2000 Republican National Convention =

The 2000 Republican National Convention was held July 31–August 4, 2000, in Philadelphia.

== Logistics ==
The 2000 Republican National Convention was held July 31–August 4, 2000, in Philadelphia. Per tradition, since Democrats were the incumbent presidential party in the 2000 presidential election, the Republican convention was held on earlier dates than the Democratic National Convention.

Each evening of the convention, the general sessions were scheduled to run from 7:30pm to 11pm ET.

== Day one: Monday, July 31 ==
Much of the first day of the convention highlighted matters related to education reforms.

=== Speakers on day one ===
In order of speech:

Speaker	Position/Notability	Notes	Cite
Dennis Hastert	speaker of the House	opening convention via satellite from Carpenters' Hall (also in Philadelphia)	
Paul Clinton Harris	member of the Virginia House of Delegates	speech on principles of freedom, delivered before presentation of colors	
Victor Weisberg	rabbi from Northbrook, Illinois	invocation	
roll call			
Ben Stein	television game show host and former presidential speechwriter	presented a political parody of his Comedy Central game show Win Ben Stein's Money	
Claudia Kirkley	4th grade teacher from Durham, North Carolina	speech on math and science initiatives	
Pilar Gomez	resident of Milwaukee, Wisconsin	speech centered on "involvement and empowerment"	
Conna Craig	director and president of the Institute for Children	speech on child adoption and foster care	
Elaine Chao	former president of the United Way of America (1993–1996); 4th U.S. Deputy Secretary of Transportation (1989–1991); wife of U.S. Senator Mitch McConnell from Kentucky	speech on subject of immigration and civil society	
Sharon Darling	president of the National Center for Family Literacy	speech on literacy programs	
Michael Feinberg	teacher at a charter school in Houston, Texas	speech on education	
Laura Bush	first lady of Texas	speech by wife of presidential nominee	
Colin Powell	former Chairman of the Joint Chiefs of Staff (1989–1993)	keynote address (1st of 2)	

=== Performers on day one ===
- Presentation of colors by Historic Pennsylvania Colonial Fife and Drum Corps
- Performance of "The Star Spangled Banner" by Mari Griego

=== Videos shown on day one ===
- Video highlighting an elementary school education program in El Paso, Texas (shown after Claudia Kirkley's remarks)
- Video highlighting the Cornerstone Schools of Detroit, Michigan (shown after Conna Craig's remarks)
- Video highlighting an after-school program in East Palo Alto, California (Shown after Sharon Darling's remarks)

== Day two: Tuesday, August 1 ==
=== Speakers on day two ===
In order of speech:

Speaker	Position/Notability	Notes	Cite
Jim Kolbe	congressman from Arizona	speech on international trade	
Ave Bie	Wisconsin public service commissioner	speech on energy issues	
Theodore Roosevelt IV	managing director at Lehman Brothers, environmental advocate, board member of the Hudson River Trust, and great-grandson of the late president Theodore Roosevelt	speech on the environment	
Norman Schwarzkopf Jr.	retired general; allied Commander during the Gulf War	speech delivered via satellite from the deck of the USS New Jersey, marking the 10th anniversary of the Iraqi invasion of Kuwait which spurred Operation Desert Storm as a response	
Bob Dole	former U.S. Senator from Kansas (1969–1996) and former senate majority leader; 1996 presidential nominee; 1976 vice presidential nominee	speech saluting American veterans	
Frank Ellis	community leader in Kansas City, Missouri	speech on neighborhood safety	
Patricia Funderburk Ware	president of Preserving Family Well-Being Foundation	speech on promiscuous lifestyles as a cause of teenage pregnancy and the spread of sexually transmitted disease	
Condoleezza Rice	professor of political science; former provost of Stanford University; member of Bush campaign's foreign policy team		
Elizabeth Dole	former U.S. secretary of labor (1989–1990); former U.S. secretary of transportation (1983–1987); unsuccessful 2000 presidential candidate; wife of 1996 nominee Bob Dole	speech centered on theme of "strength through compassion"	
John McCain	U.S. Senator of Arizona (1987–2018); unsuccessful 2000 Republican presidential candidate	keynote address (2nd of 2)	

=== Performers on day two ===
- Everett Alvererz Jr. (Note: the first United States aviator shot-down during the Vietnam War) performing the Pledge of Allegiance
- Olivia Lalewicz performing "The Star Spangled Banner"
- Jimmie Vaughan and his Tilt-a-Whirl Band

== Day three: Wednesday, August 2 ==
=== Speakers on day three ===
In order of speech:

Speaker	Position/Notability	Notes	Cite
Steve Young	former NFL quarterback	invocation	
Kenny Gamble	soul singer	speech on urban renewal and revitalization	
Leilani Durante	single mother from Beaver Dam, Wisconsin		
Kim Jennings	single mother from Rodgers, Arkansas		
Christina Jones	business owner from Austin, Texas		
Jim Gilmore	governor of Virginia		
Raul J. Fernandez	chairman and chief executive of Proxicom		
Hector V. Barreto	president of Barreto Insurance and Financial Services in Glendale, California; founder of the United States Hispanic Chamber of Commerce		
continuation of roll call			
Marvin Hier	rabbi and dean of the Museum of Tolerance		
Richard Riordan	mayor of Los Angeles		
Jim Gilmore	governor of Virginia		
Trent Lott	senate majority leader from Mississippi		
Lynne Cheney	former chair of the National Endowment for the Humanities (1986–1993)	speech by wife of VP nominee	
Dick Cheney	U.S. secretary of defense (1989–1993)	acceptance speech by vice presidential nominee	

=== Performers on day three ===
- Joe Guerra leading the "Pledge of Allegiance"
- Rebecca King performing "The Star Spangled Banner"
- Harold Melvin & the Blue Notes
- The Delfonics
- Congressman Joe Scarborough and his band Regular Joe
- Jon Secada
- Lee Greenwood

=== Videos shown on day three ===
- Video on Republican governors
- Video highlighting the Center for Training Employment in Cleveland

== Day four: Thursday, August 3 ==
=== Speakers on day four ===
In order of speech:

Speaker	Position/Notability	Notes	Citation
Mark Craig	pastor of the Highland Park United Methodist Church	invocation	
Nancy Brinker	breast cancer awareness advocate	speech on Bush's efforts to combat breast cancer	
Bill Frist	senator from Tennessee	speech on Patient's Bill of Rights	
Phyllis C. Hunter		speech on Texas Reading Initiatives	
Mike Rantilla	union member from Courtland, Ohio	speech on Social Security and taxes	
Dave Wenzel	former mayor of Scranton, Pennsylvania; decorated veteran of the Vietnam War	speech on initiatives to assist those with disabilities	
Bo Derek	actress	speech introducing Abel Maldonado	
Abel Maldonado	member of the California State Assembly	Spanish language remarks	
Heather Whitestone McCallum	winner of the 1995 Miss America pageant	remarks introducting a video tribune to Laura Bush	
George P. Bush	nephew of presidential nominee	bilingual (English and Spanish) address focused on issues impacting young Americans	
Vito Fossella	congressman from New York	speech on Social Security reform	
Sally Brenner and Amy Knutsen	grandmother and granddaughter pair from New Jersey	speech on Social Security	
Rudy Bradley	member of the Florida House of Representatives	speech on his reasons for switching parties from a Democrat to a Republican	
Tom Ridge	governor of Pennsylvania (1995–2001)	speech formally nominating Bush	
Jan Bullock	widow of the late Texas lieutenant governor Bob Bullock		
Kibyjon Caldwell	reverend and longtime friend of Bush	introducing a video biography of Bush	
George W. Bush	governor of Texas (1995–2000)	presidential nomination acceptance speech	
Anthony Bevilacqua	cardinal and archbishop of the Archdiocese of Philadelphia (1988–2003)	benediction	

=== Performers on day four ===
- Presentation of colors by Korean War veterans of the Maryland Honor Guard
- Nic Lott performing the "Pledge of Allegiance"
- Lorrie Morgan performing "The Star Spangled Banner"
- Philadelphia Boy's Choir
- Chaka Khan –closing performance

=== Videos shown on day four ===
- Video tribute to Laura Bush
- Video biography of Bush

=== Balloon drop ===
After the acceptance speech by Bush, a traditional convention-closing balloon drop took place. The 2000 balloon drop was orchestrated by Treb Heining, who had orchestrated balloon drops at the previous three Republican National Conventions. In 2000, Heining also orchestrated the Democratic National Convention balloon drop.

== See also ==
- Schedule of the 2000 Democratic National Convention
