= Balloonfest '86 =

Fundraising event in Cleveland, Ohio, U.S.

- Date: September 27, 1986; 40 years ago
- Time: Around 1:50 PM EDT
- Location: Public Square, Cleveland, Ohio, U.S.; 41°29′59″N 81°41′38″W
- Organized by: United Way of Cleveland (sponsor); Treb Heining (coordinator)
- Outcome: World record for simultaneous release of balloons
- Injuries: Multiple horses
- Property damage: Multiple traffic collisions
- Litigation: 2 lawsuits

Balloonfest '86 was a fundraising event in Cleveland, Ohio, United States, held on September 27, 1986, in which the local chapter of United Way set a world record by releasing almost 1.5 million balloons. The event was intended to be a harmless publicity stunt. However, the released balloons drifted back over the city and Lake Erie and landed in the surrounding area, causing problems for traffic and a nearby airport. In consequence, the organizers faced lawsuits seeking millions of dollars in damages, and cost overruns put the event at a net loss. The event also interfered with a United States Coast Guard search for two boaters who were later found drowned.

== Preparations ==
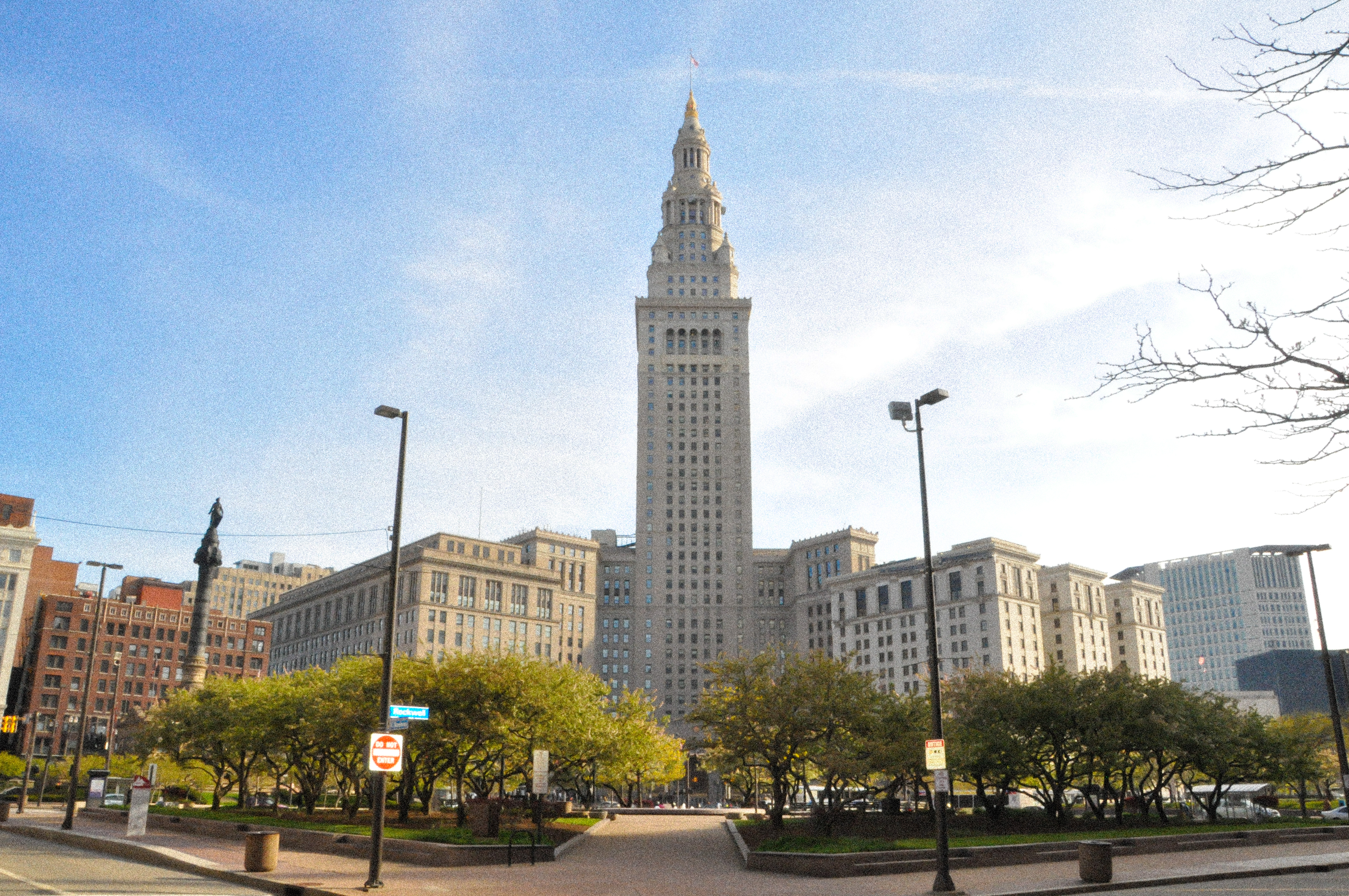
Terminal Tower overlooking Public Square

Balloonfest '86 was coordinated by a Los Angeles-based company headed by Treb Heining, Balloonart by Treb, which spent six months preparing for the event. A rectangular structure the size of a city block was set up to hold the balloons on the southwest quadrant of Cleveland's Public Square. It measured 250 by 150 feet (76 by 46 m), was three stories high and was covered with a one-piece net of woven mesh material. Inside, 2,500 volunteers, consisting largely of high school students, spent many hours filling the balloons with helium. One described the preparations as "like an assembly line, non-stop." Volunteers received free T-shirts.

United Way originally planned to release two million balloons, but eventually stopped at over 1.4 million. Children sold sponsorships to benefit United Way at the price of $1 ($2.94 in 2025) for every two balloons.

== Launch ==
On Saturday, September 27, 1986, with a rainstorm approaching, organizers decided on an early release of the balloons at about 1:50 p.m. EDT. A crowd of over 100,000 gathered in downtown Cleveland for the event. Close to 1.5 million balloons rose up from Public Square, surrounding Terminal Tower and surpassing a world record set the previous year on the 30th anniversary of Disneyland.

== Consequences ==
Typically, a helium-filled latex balloon that is released outdoors will stay aloft long enough to be almost fully deflated before it descends to Earth. However, the Balloonfest balloons collided with a front of cool air and rain, which caused them to drop towards the ground while still inflated. The descending balloons clogged the land and waterways of Northeast Ohio. In the days following the event, many balloons were reported washed ashore on the Canadian side of Lake Erie, causing water pollution. Some people had misconceptions about the environmental impact of balloon releases, thinking that "the balloons would reach an altitude where they popped and disintegrated."

Burke Lakefront Airport had to shut down a runway for half an hour after balloons landed there. Traffic collisions were also reported "as drivers swerved to avoid slow motion blizzards of multicolored orbs or took their eyes off the road to gawk at the overhead spectacle."

Two fishermen, Raymond Broderick and Bernard Sulzer (also reported as Skip Sullivan by some publications), who had gone out on September 26, were reported missing by their families on the day of the event. Rescuers spotted their 16-foot (4.9 m) boat anchored west of the Edgewater Park breakwall. A Coast Guard search and rescue helicopter crew had difficulties reaching the area because of the balloons landing in the lake. A search-and-rescue boat crew tried to spot the fishermen floating in the lake, but Guard officials said balloons in the water made it impossible to see whether anyone was in the lake. On September 29, the Coast Guard suspended its search. The fishermen's bodies subsequently washed ashore. The wife of one of the fishermen sued the United Way of Cleveland and the company that organized the balloon release for $3.2 million, and later settled on undisclosed terms. Roger Rice, Search and Rescue Program Manager for Coast Guard District 9, said in a 2024 interview that "Balloonfest did not have anything to do with the unfortunate deaths of both these men".

Balloons landing on a pasture in Geauga County, Ohio, spooked Louise Nowakowski's Arabian horses, which allegedly suffered permanent injuries as a result. Nowakowski sued the United Way of Cleveland for $100,000 in damages and settled for undisclosed terms.

The fundraiser lost money due to cost overruns.

== Legacy ==
The 1988 edition of The Guinness Book of World Records recognizes the event as a world record "largest ever mass balloon release", with 1,429,643 balloons launched. Guinness no longer measures balloon releases.

Balloonfest '86 was the subject of Nathan Truesdell's 2017 short documentary film Balloonfest, which explores the balloon launch via archival footage. The editor of Cleveland newspaper The Plain Dealer noted that after its release, reporting on the Balloonfest became more negative.
