= Statue of John Plankinton =

Artwork by Richard Henry Park

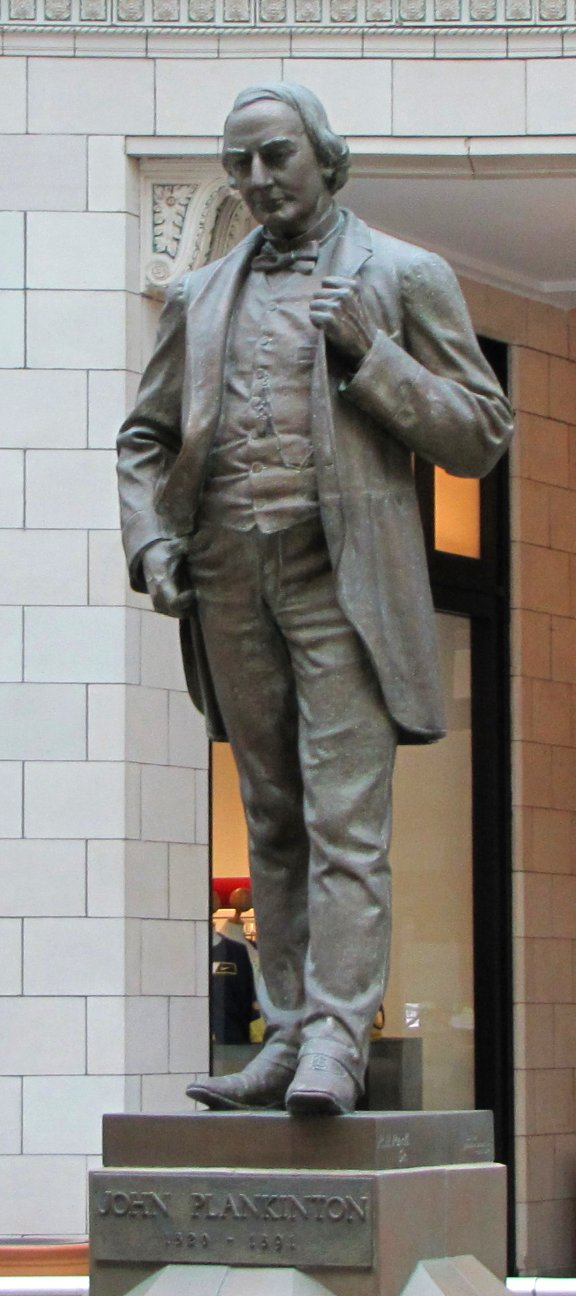
- John Plankinton bronze statue Milwaukee Grand Plankinton Arcade
- Artist: Richard Henry Park
- Year: 1892
- Medium: Bronze
- Subject: John Plankinton
- Dimensions: 1.8 m (6 ft)
- Location: Shops of Grand Avenue, Milwaukee; 43°02′18.2″N 87°54′43.6″W

The John Plankinton statue is a six foot (1.8 m) lifelike representation of the businessman and industrialist. It took the sculptor Richard Henry Park six months to make and was initially placed in the Plankinton House Hotel in downtown Milwaukee in 1892. The property in 1916 was redeveloped into the Plankinton Arcade shopping plaza. The property was again redeveloped in the 1970s into the John Plankinton Mall at the same location where the hotel once stood. The latest redevelopment of the property occurred in 1980 to 1982 and renamed the Shops of Grand Avenue. The statue was restored in 2012 and placed on a 15 foot (4.6 m) pedestal becoming a permanent part of the shopping plaza.

== Description and history ==
The background history of the bronze statue starts shortly after businessman John Plankinton's death in March 1891. The idea for a statue or bust was proposed seven months later in October 1891. Richard Henry Park, known as the Florentine sculptor, had already done statues for the Plankinton family, so was commissioned by his son William to make the bronze statue in 1892. Park, who spent six months in Chicago working on the John Plankinton bronze statue, was perhaps a surprising choice as Park had betrayed Elizabeth Plankinton (John's daughter) and married another woman in 1887, leaving her disappointed and distraught.

Park made the six foot (1.8 m) bronze statue with a realistic lifelike representation of John Plankinton standing at ease. It was initially placed in the rotunda of the Plankinton House Hotel in downtown Milwaukee on March 28, 1892. The statue remained there until a redevelopment into a shopping district in 1916 took place on the property and the hotel taken down. The redeveloped shopping district was called the Plankinton Arcade was originally promoted by businessman Charles Somers. It had billiard tables and bowling alleys in the basement of the facilities.

The property was again remodeled in the 1970s and then called the John Plankinton Mall. The latest redesign of the property between 1980 and 1982 incorporated a circular atrium specifically for the statue. The property was again renamed and called Shops of Grand Avenue or sometimes shortened to The Grand shopping plaza. Grand Avenue was the name of a 19th-century prestigious street and is now called Wisconsin Avenue. In 2012 restoration work was done to the bronze statue that took several months. Afterwards it was returned to its base made by the American Bronze Company. This base at the foot of the bronze statue is titled John Plankinton 1820 – 1891. The statue on its 15 foot (4.6 m) pedestal is now a permanent part of the shopping plaza.

== Bronze statue views ==
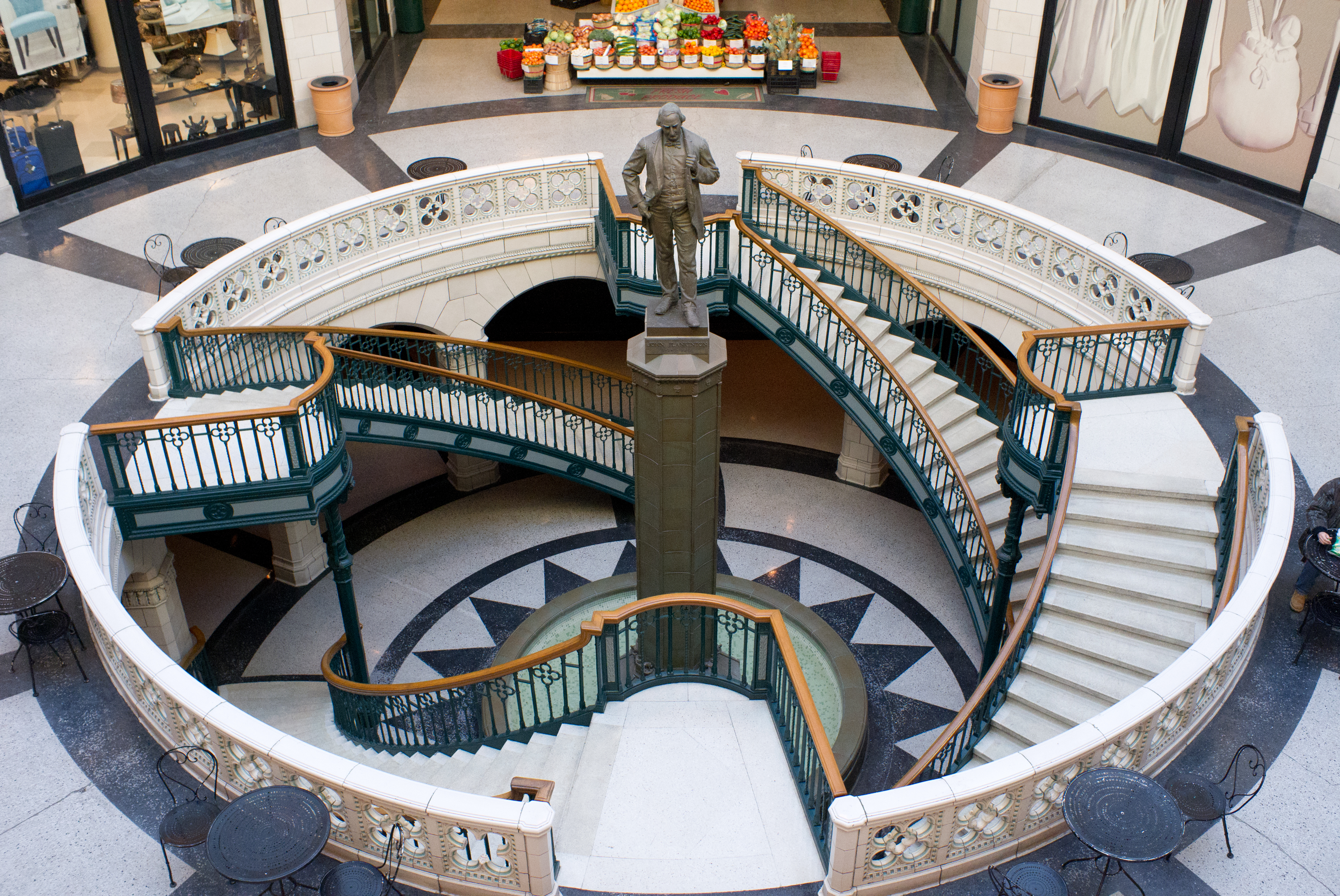

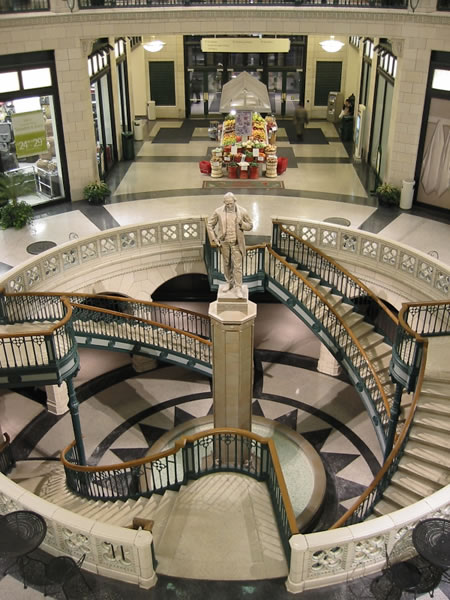

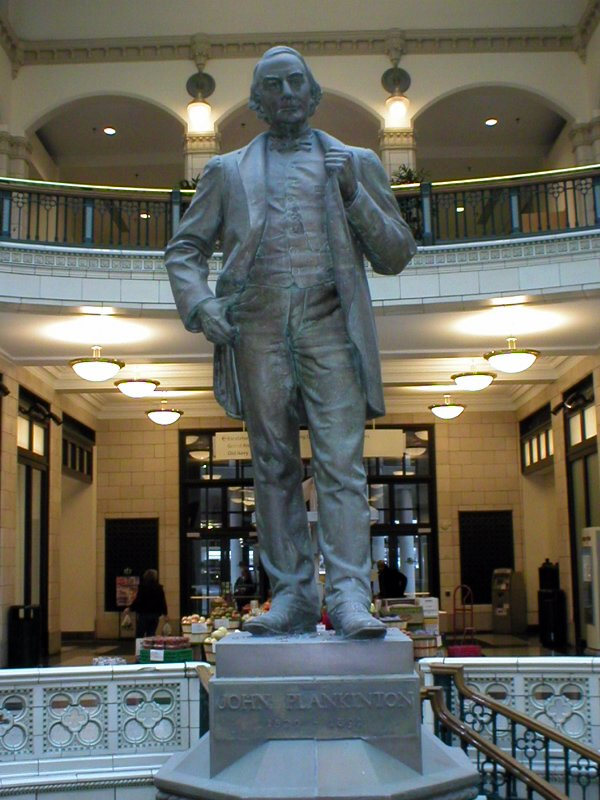

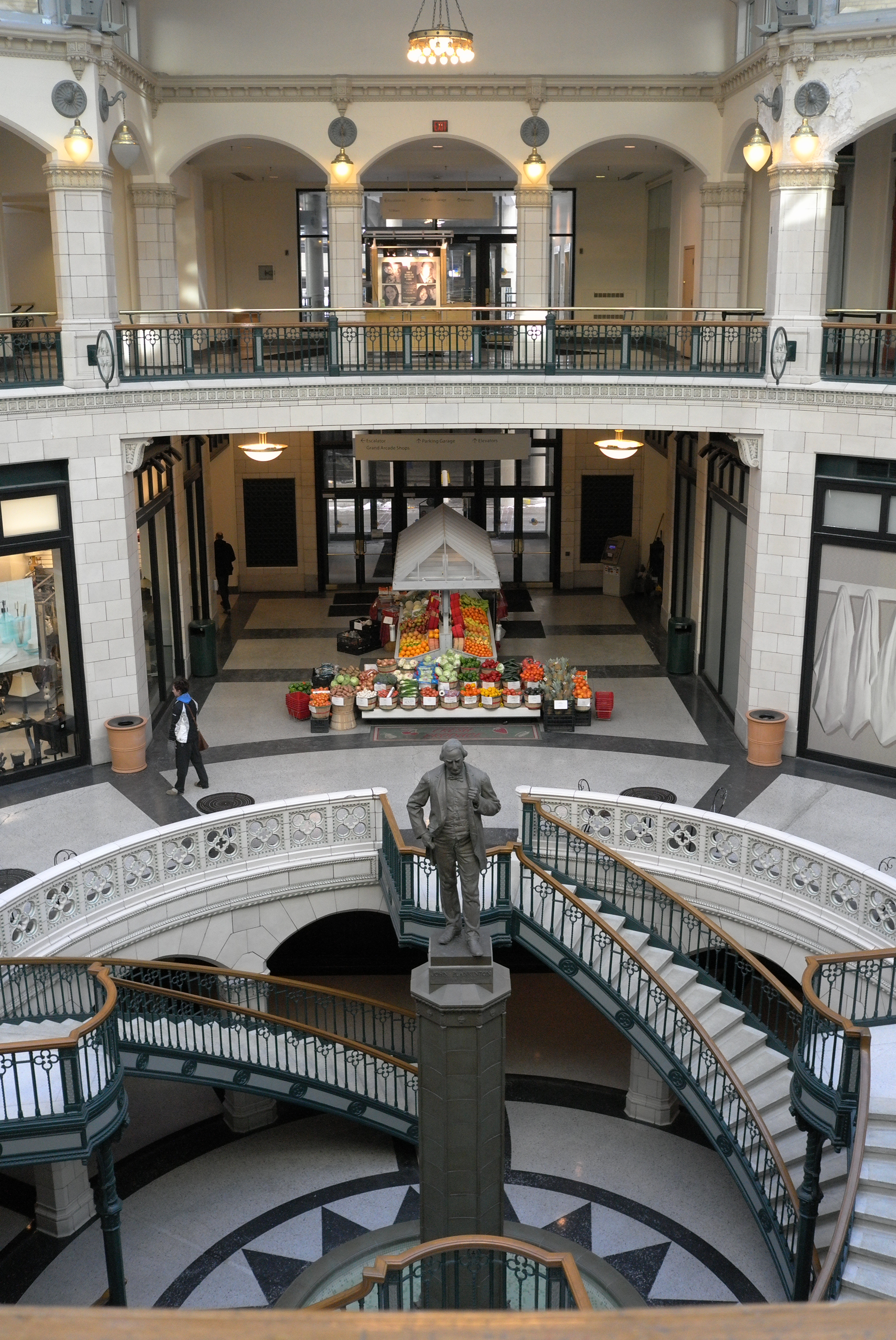

== Renovation work ==
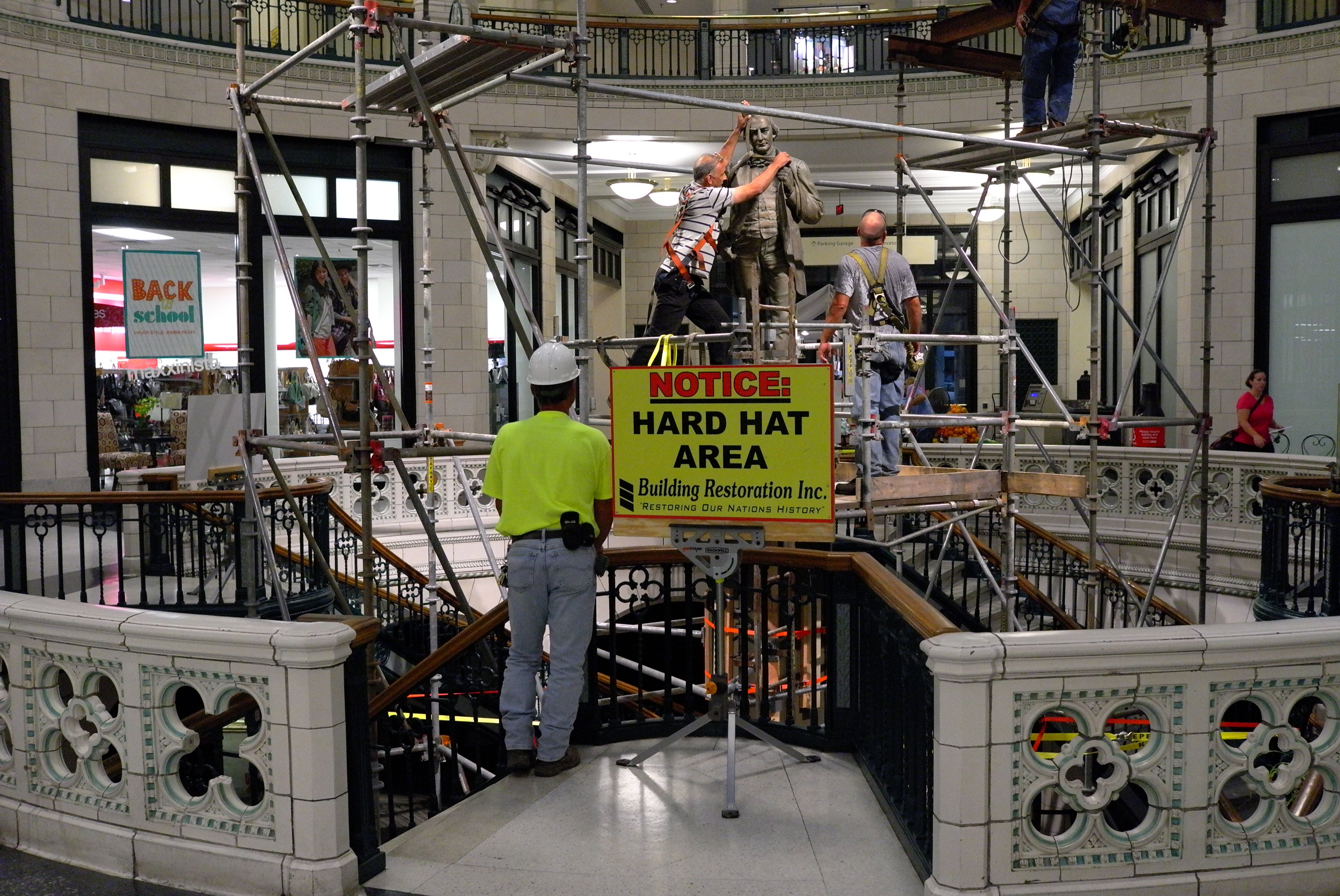

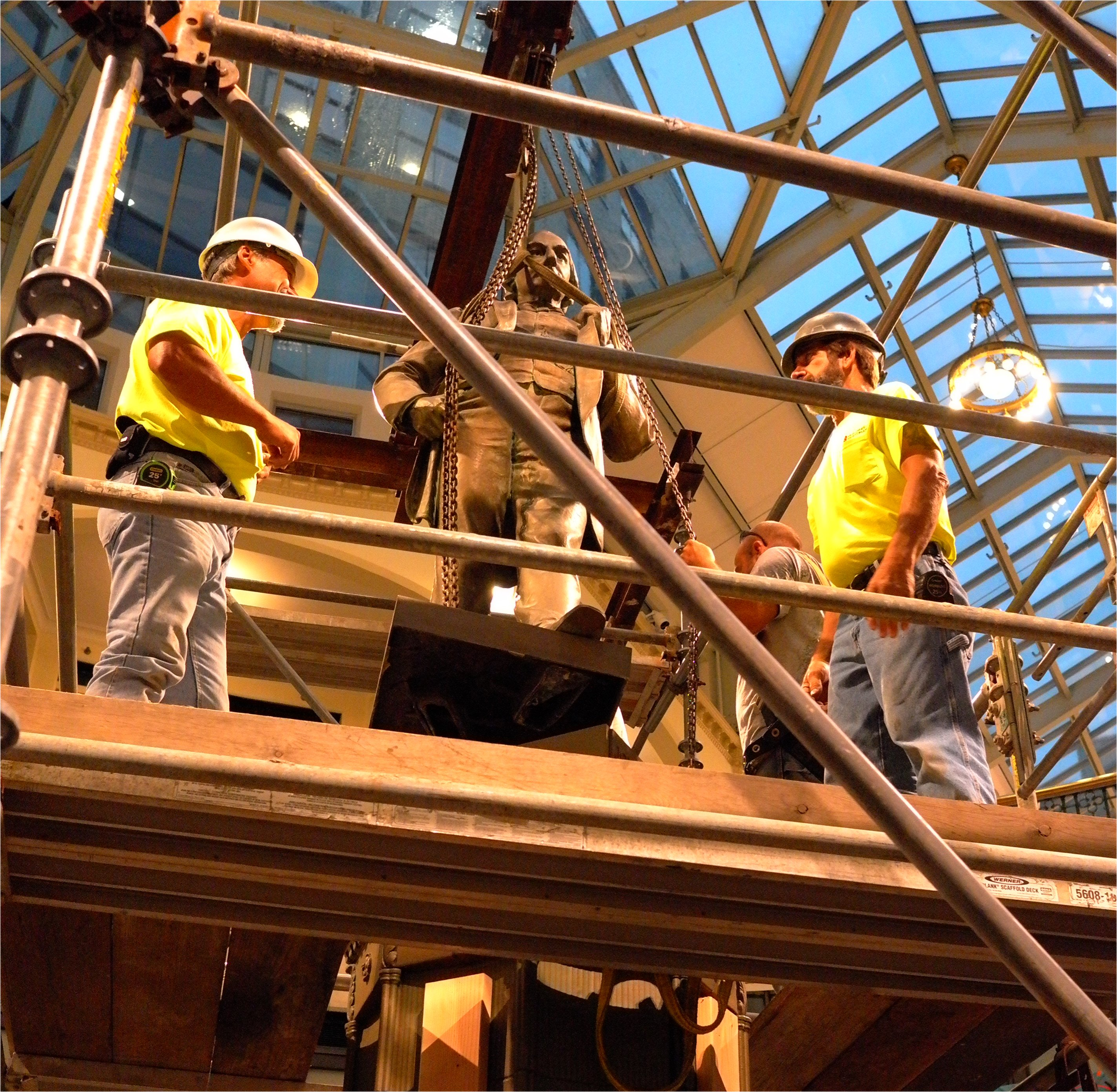

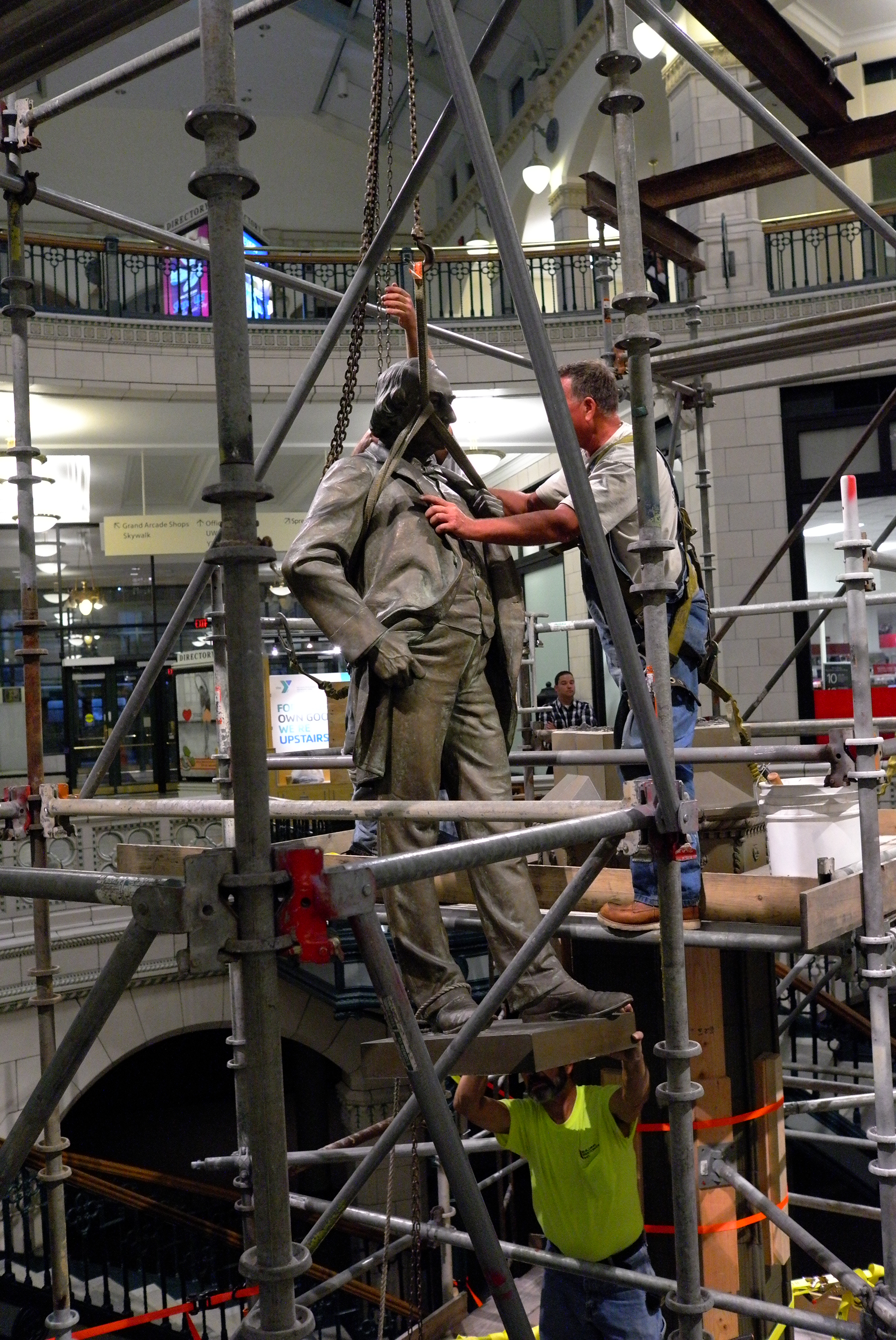

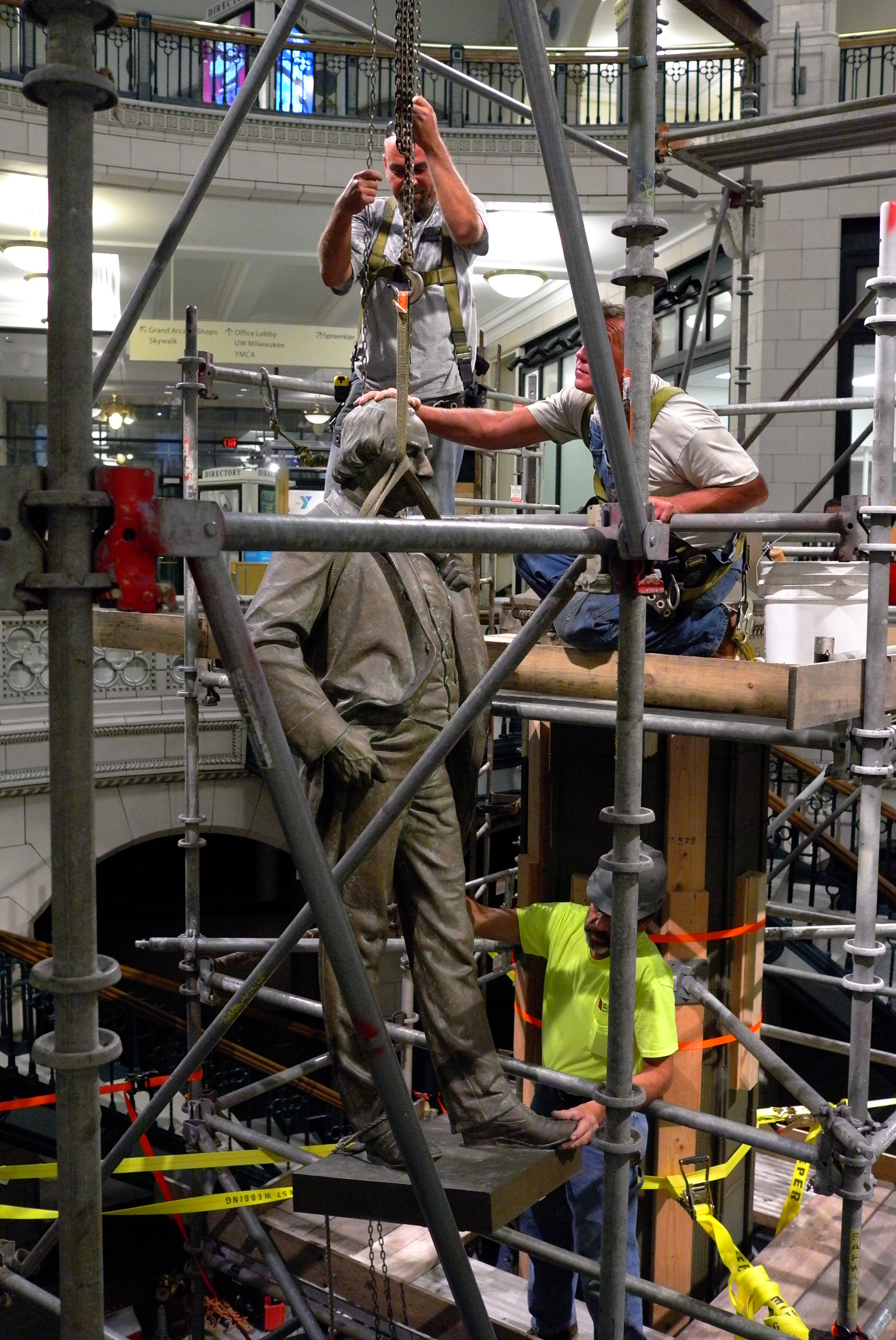
