= Clark, Missouri =

- City
- Location of Clark, Missouri
- Coordinates: 39°16′11″N 92°20′34″W
- Country: United States
- State: Missouri
- County: Randolph

Area
  - Total: 0.60 sq mi (1.55 km^{2})
  - Land: 0.60 sq mi (1.55 km^{2})
  - Water: 0 sq mi (0.00 km^{2})
- Elevation: 866 ft (264 m)

Population (2020)
  - Total: 254
  - Density: 424.4/sq mi (163.88/km^{2})
- Time zone: UTC-6 (Central (CST))
  - Summer (DST): UTC-5 (CDT)
- ZIP code: 65243
- Area code: 573
- FIPS code: 29-14068
- GNIS feature ID: 2393537

Clark is a city in Randolph County, Missouri, United States. As of the 2020 census, Clark had a population of 254.

== History ==
A post office called Clark has been in operation since 1887. The community has the name of John Bullock Clark Jr., a five-term U.S. Congressman from Missouri.

== Geography ==
According to the United States Census Bureau, the city has a total area of 0.58 square miles (1.50 km^{2}), all land.

== Demographics ==
Historical population
Census	Pop.	Note	%±
1890	194		—
1900	223		14.9%
1910	300		34.5%
1920	315		5.0%
1930	334		6.0%
1940	273		−18.3%
1950	276		1.1%
1960	260		−5.8%
1970	271		4.2%
1980	304		12.2%
1990	257		−15.5%
2000	275		7.0%
2010	298		8.4%
2020	254		−14.8%
U.S. Decennial Census

=== 2010 census ===
As of the census of 2010, there were 298 people, 105 households, and 71 families residing in the city. The population density was 513.8 inhabitants per square mile (198.4/km^{2}). There were 120 housing units at an average density of 206.9 per square mile (79.9/km^{2}). The racial makeup of the city was 97.7% White, 0.3% African American, 0.3% Native American, 0.3% Asian, and 1.3% from two or more races. Hispanic or Latino of any race were 1.3% of the population.

There were 105 households, of which 45.7% had children under the age of 18 living with them, 44.8% were married couples living together, 18.1% had a female householder with no husband present, 4.8% had a male householder with no wife present, and 32.4% were non-families. 22.9% of all households were made up of individuals, and 8.6% had someone living alone who was 65 years of age or older. The average household size was 2.84 and the average family size was 3.35.

The median age in the city was 30 years. 32.6% of residents were under the age of 18; 12.1% were between the ages of 18 and 24; 23.8% were from 25 to 44; 22.4% were from 45 to 64; and 9.1% were 65 years of age or older. The gender makeup of the city was 49.7% male and 50.3% female.

=== 2000 census ===
As of the census of 2000, there were 275 people, 103 households, and 71 families residing in the city. The population density was 1,176.0 inhabitants per square mile (454.1/km^{2}). There were 117 housing units at an average density of 500.3 per square mile (193.2/km^{2}). The racial makeup of the city was 97.82% White, 0.36% Native American, and 1.82% from two or more races. Hispanic or Latino of any race were 1.09% of the population.

There were 103 households, out of which 37.9% had children under the age of 18 living with them, 59.2% were married couples living together, 8.7% had a female householder with no husband present, and 30.1% were non-families. 27.2% of all households were made up of individuals, and 10.7% had someone living alone who was 65 years of age or older. The average household size was 2.67 and the average family size was 3.22.

In the city the population was spread out, with 29.8% under the age of 18, 9.8% from 18 to 24, 29.8% from 25 to 44, 19.6% from 45 to 64, and 10.9% who were 65 years of age or older. The median age was 33 years. For every 100 females there were 83.3 males. For every 100 females age 18 and over, there were 83.8 males.

The median income for a household in the city was $31,875, and the median income for a family was $34,167. Males had a median income of $25,500 versus $17,500 for females. The per capita income for the city was $11,704. About 14.3% of families and 18.8% of the population were below the poverty line, including 32.6% of those under the age of eighteen and 8.0% of those 65 or over.

== Speed trap history ==
From 2009 to 2012 The City of Clark Police Department (CPD) operated almost constant traffic enforcement on US Highway 63 and Missouri Highway 22. In Spring of 2012, the entire police department was suspended due to complaints, then in May 2012 the City Council disbanded the CPD due to a pending investigation by the Missouri State Highway Patrol to which the department was cleared and given an excellent rating by the Missouri Auditors Office and reinstated.

== Notable people ==
- Omar Bradley (February 12, 1893 - August 8, 1981) One of the main U.S. Army field commanders in North Africa and Europe during World War II and a General of the United States Army.
- Nathan Truesdell Documentary filmmaker, born and raised in Clark.
