= Balloon drops at United States presidential nominating conventions =

Balloon drop at the 2008 Republican Convention

In modern practice, both major party United States presidential nominating conventions (the Democratic National Convention and the Republican National Convention) typically end with a large balloon drop upon the conclusion of their presidential nominee's acceptance speech. This is a display created by releasing a large array of balloons from nets in the convention hall rafters. The first balloon drop at a presidential convention was at the 1932 Republican National Convention.

== History ==
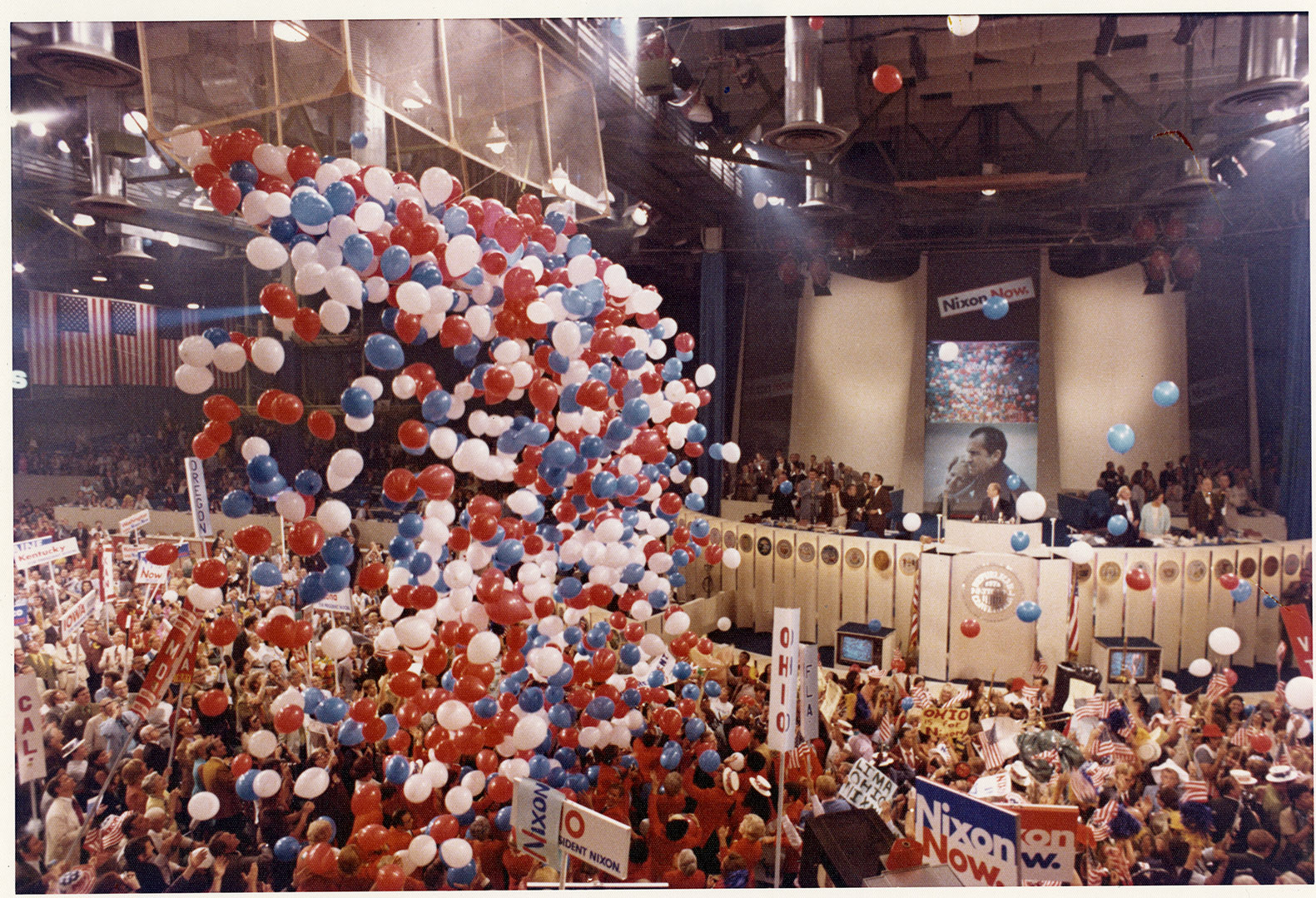
Balloon drop at the 1972 Republican Convention

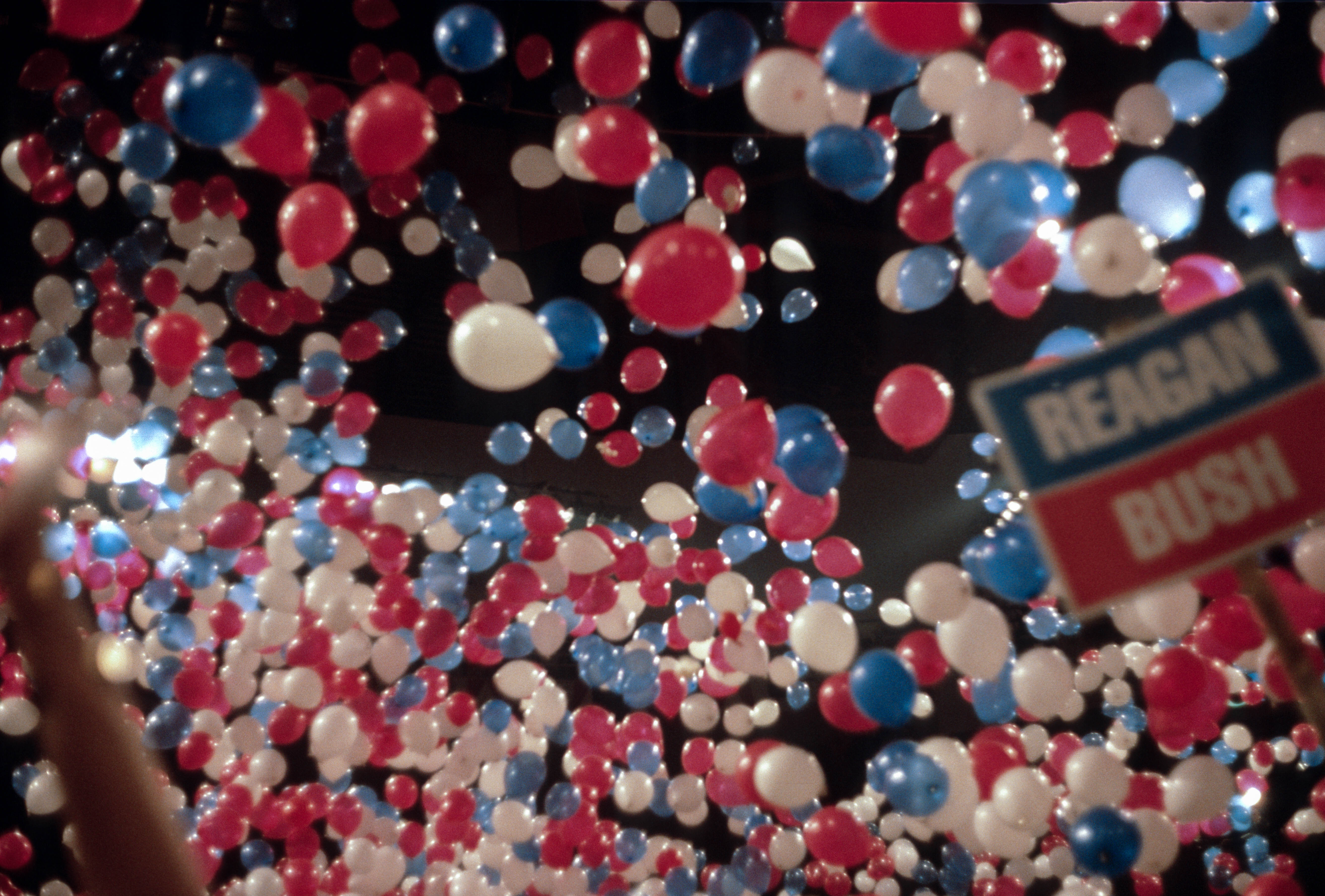
Balloon drop at the 1980 Republican Convention

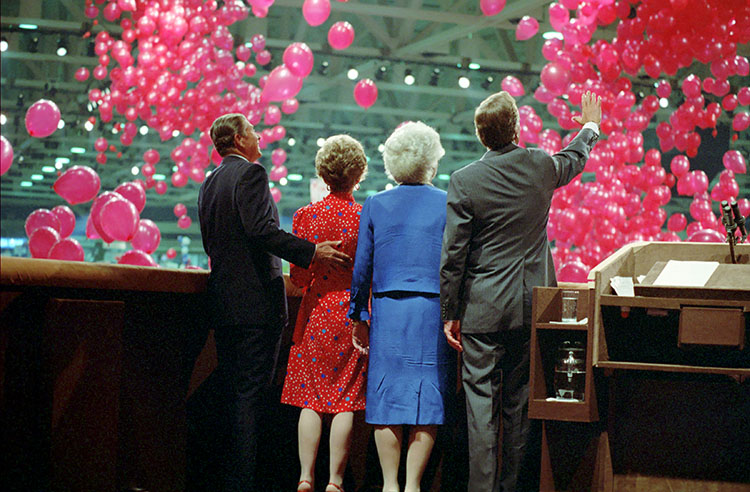
Nominees Ronald Reagan and George H. W. Bush and their wives stand on stage during the balloon drop at the 1984 Republican Convention

Balloon drop at the 2008 Republican Convention

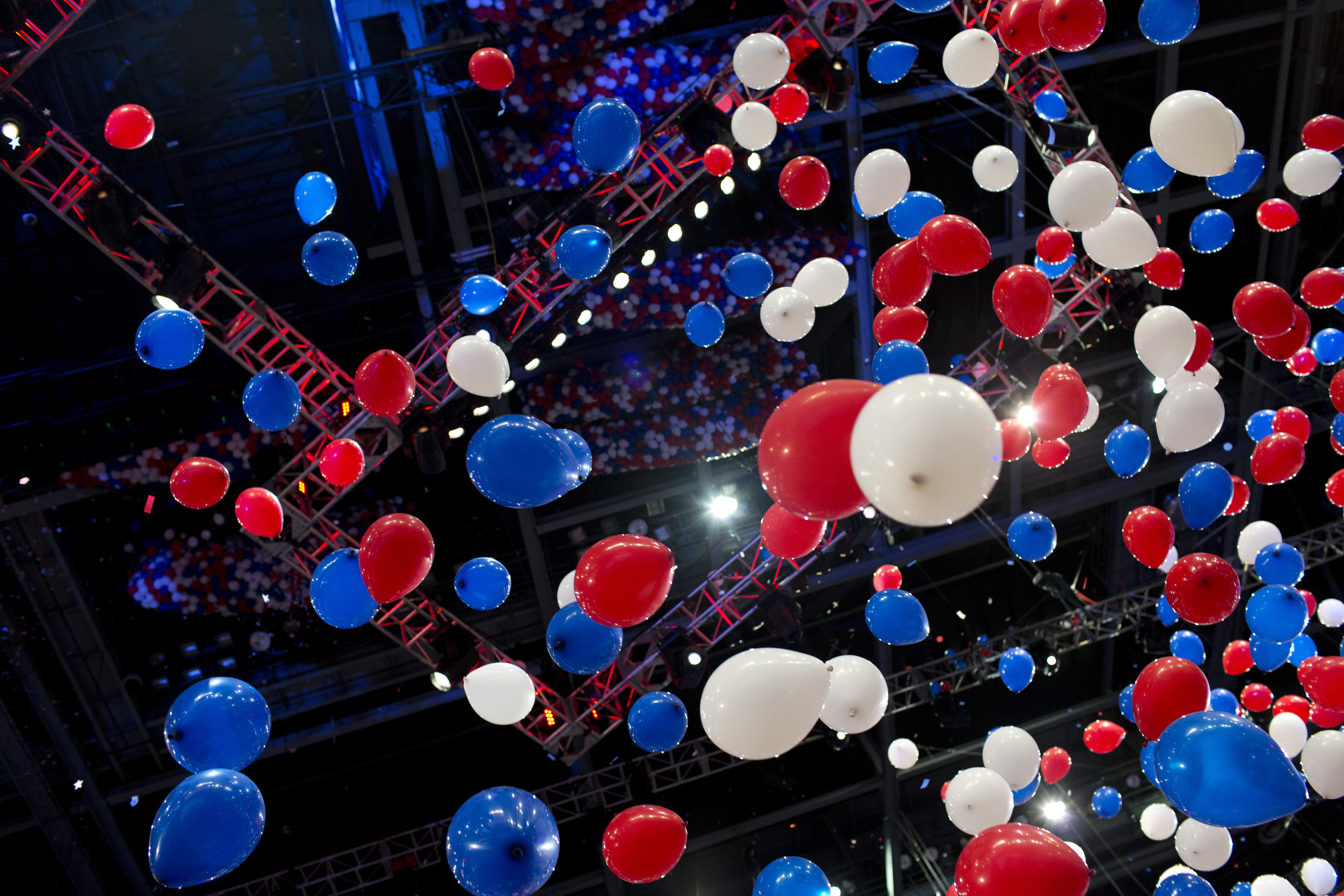
Balloon drop at the 2012 Republican Convention

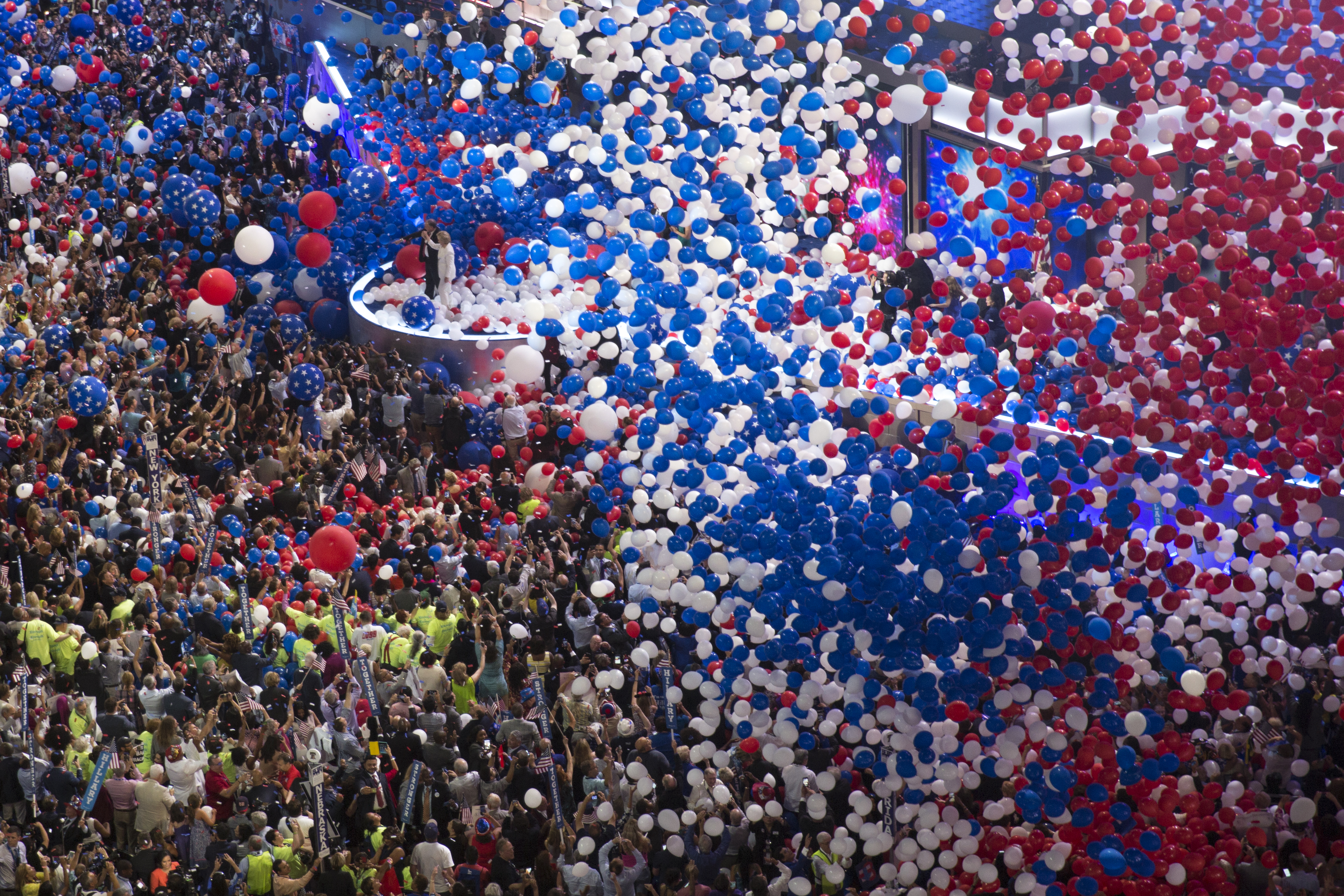
Balloon drop at the 2016 Democratic Convention

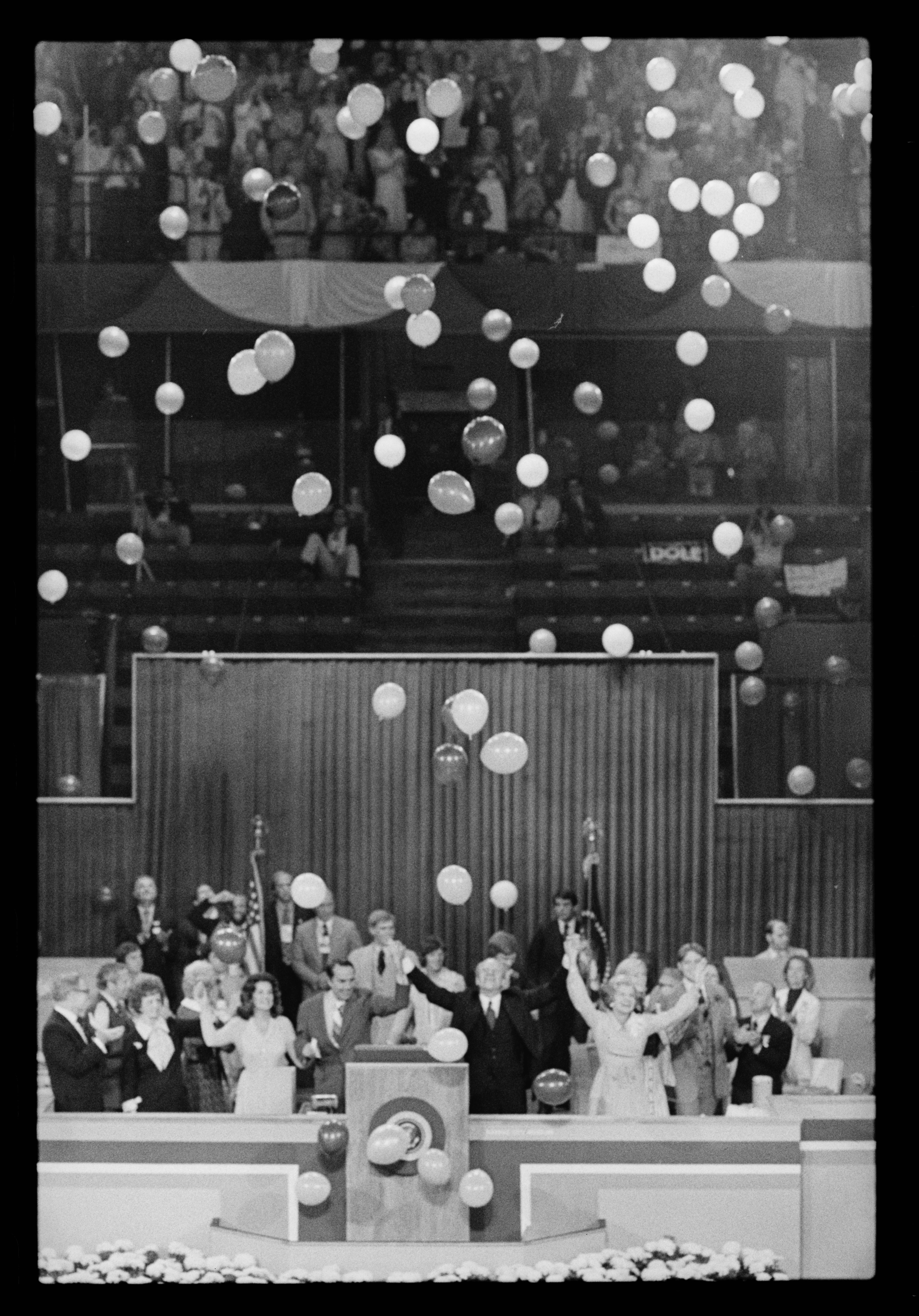
Nominees Gerald Ford and Bob Dole, their wives, and others stand on stage during the balloon drop at the 1976 Republican Convention

The first convention balloon drop occurred at the 1932 Republican National Convention. It was intended to insert pomp and spontaneity to what was otherwise a formality gathering to renominate an unpopular president (Herbert Hoover) amid the onslaught of the Great Depression), in hopes of livening the convention and enthusing delegates of a Republican Party that was heading into what was poised to be a very tough election for that party.

Balloon drop at the 2016 Republican Convention

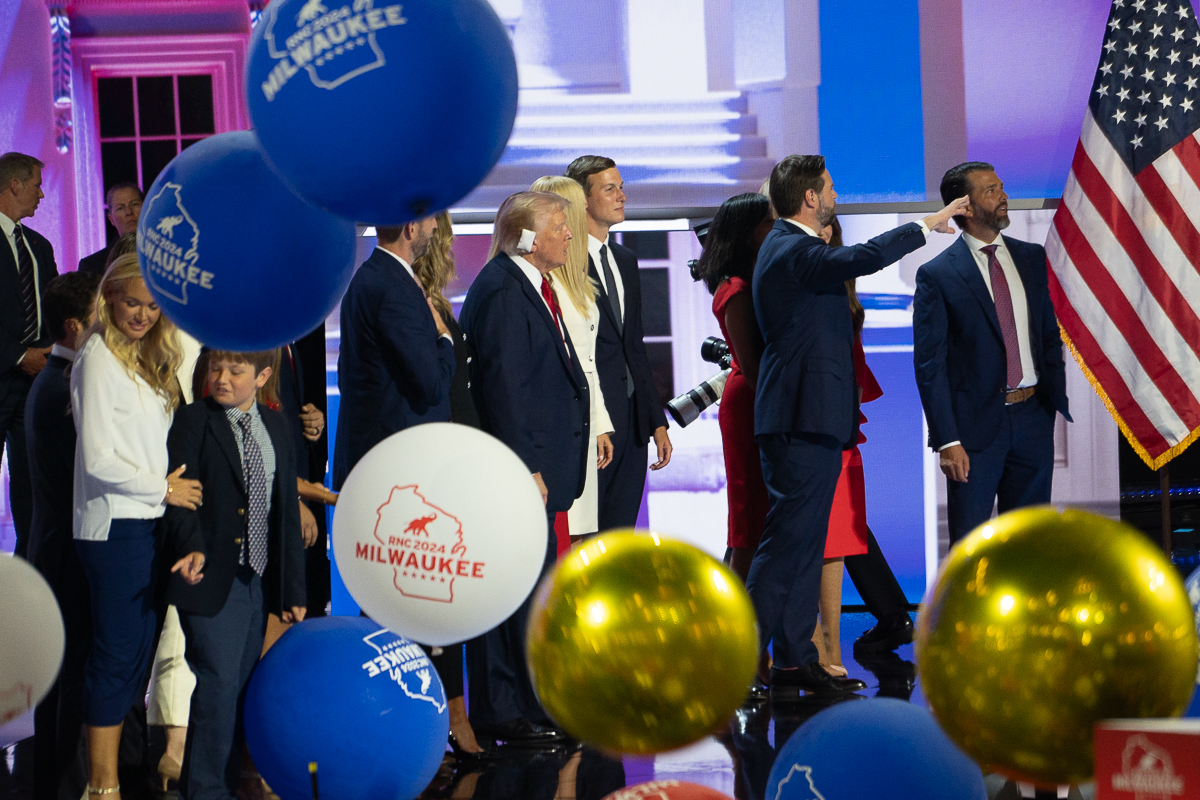
Nominees Donald Trump and JD Vance and their families on stage during the balloon drop at the 2024 Republican Convention

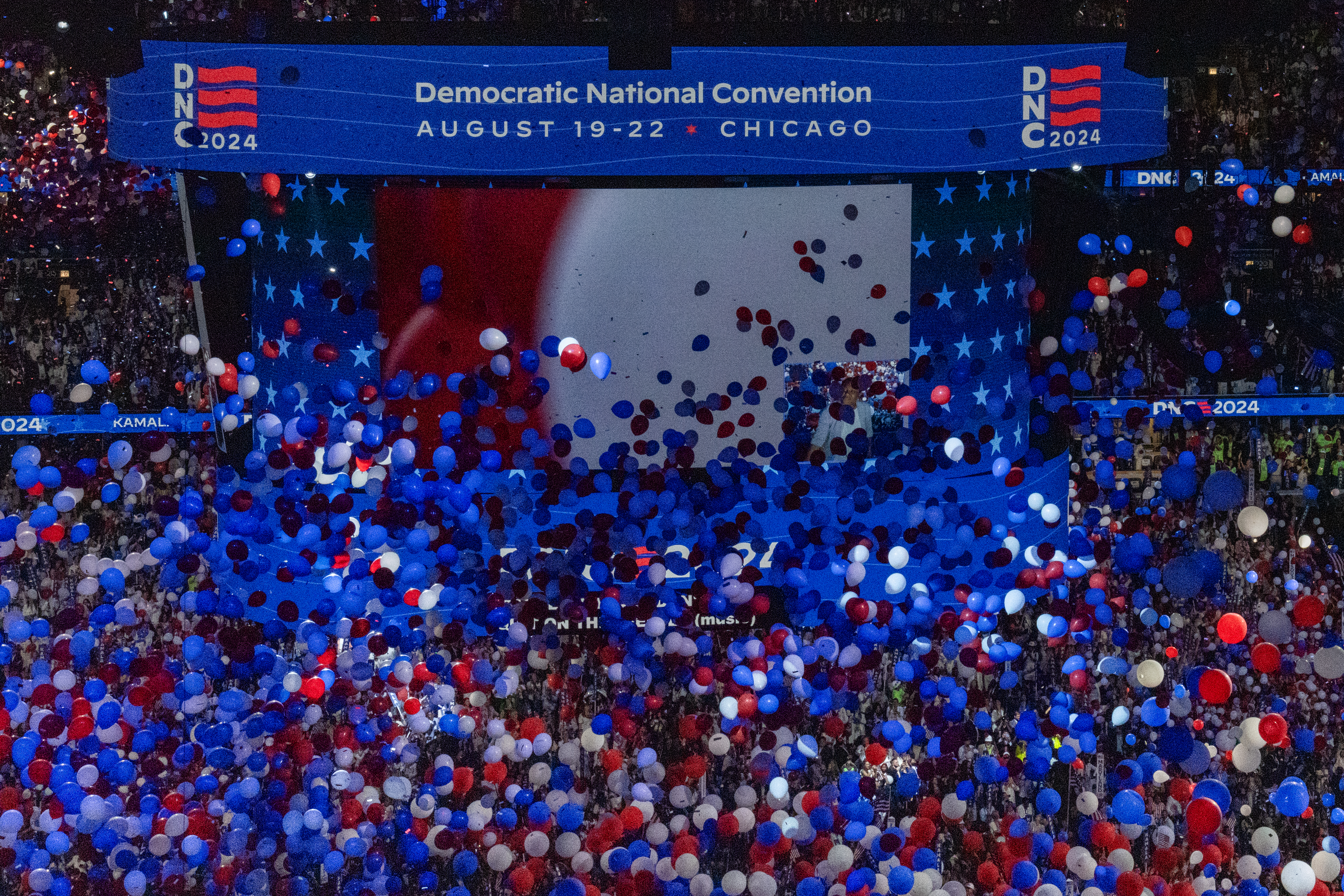
Balloon drop at the 2024 Democratic Convention

In modern practice, most major party conventions conclude with a balloon drop. There have been exceptions, though. Democrats did not include balloon drops at their 1984 or 1988 conventions. Democrats also did not have a balloon drop at their 2008, 2012, and 2020 conventions due to logistical reasons. Their 2008 convention's final evening was held at outdoor venue (with no rafters in which to place balloons), thus a fireworks display was substituted. Their 2012 convention was initially planned similarly have its final evening held at an outdoor venue. While the evening was ultimately shifted the same indoor venue as the rest of the convention, this shift came too late for a balloon drop to be set up. The party's 2020 convention was downsized due to the COVID-19 pandemic, with the balloon drop being a casualty of the pandemic downsizing. Instead, a post-speech fireworks display in the parking lot outside the venue used for the acceptance speech was substituted. Similarly, the 2020 Republican National Convention also lacked a balloon drop. With the 2020 Republican convention also altered due to the pandemic, the acceptance speech was instead held on the South Lawn (of the White House) with a fireworks display on the National Mall being held as a substitute for a balloon drop.

A balloon drop was staged to conclude the 2026 Republican National Convention, an unusual instance of a major party staging a national convention in a year without a presidential election.

== Logistics involved ==
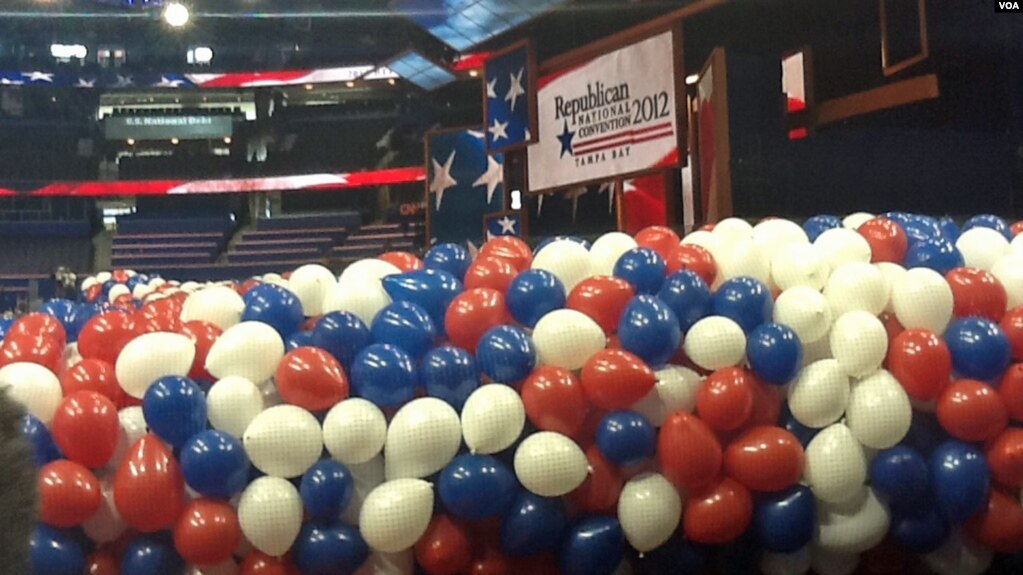
Balloon nets being prepared ahead of the 2012 Republican Convention

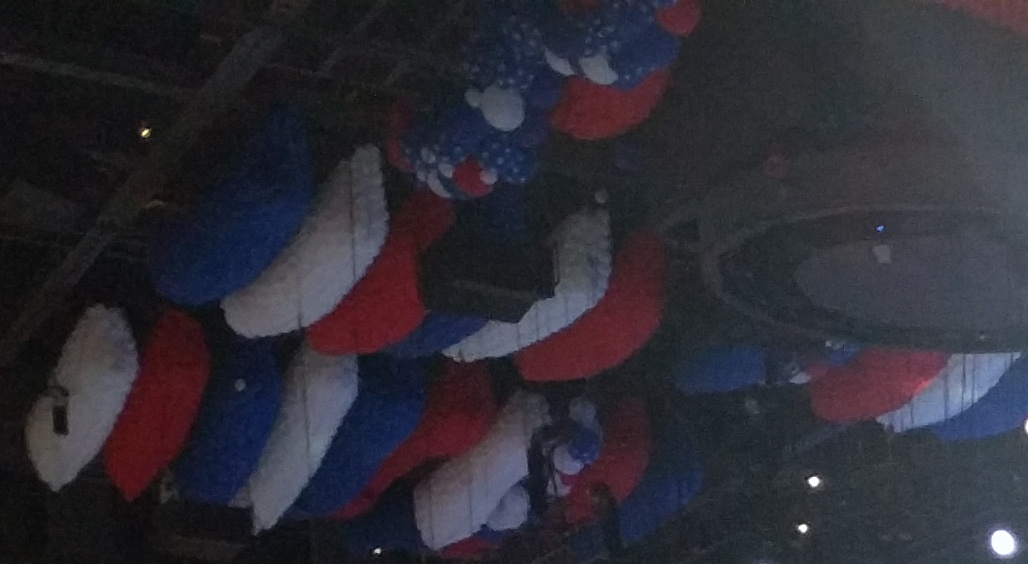
Nets filled with balloons in the rafters of the convention hall for the 2016 Democratic Convention

Ahead of conventions, many thousands of balloons will be filled by local volunteers (regularly school students) and raised to the ceiling in nets. These nets hold the balloons in place until the balloon drop. For the 2012 Republican National Convention, between 16 and 20 laborers were needed on the closing evening to carry out the tasks to carry out the balloon drop.

A major name in convention balloon drops is Treb Heining. He began orchestrating Republican balloon drops at the 1988 Republican National Convention, and has thus far been in charge of every Republican National Convention ballon drop since (most recently orchestrating the balloon drop at the 2024 and 2026 Republican conventions). He also orchestrated the balloon drops at the 2000, 2016, and 2024 Democratic National Conventions. He also acted as a consultant for balloon drops at other Democratic conventions.

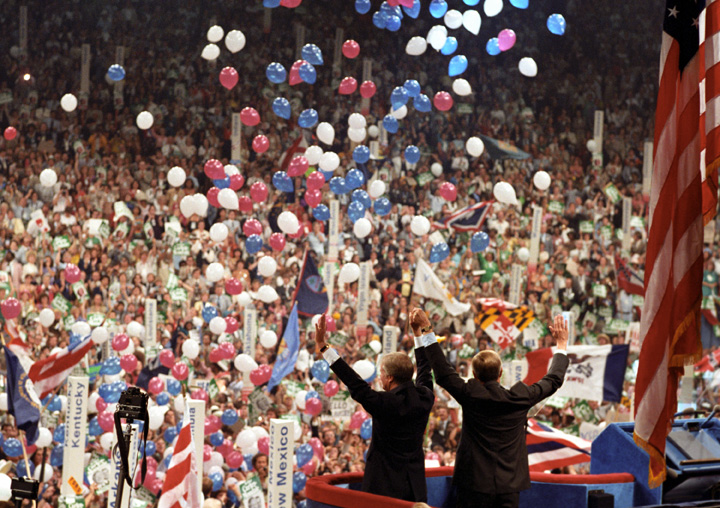
Nominees Jimmy Carter and Walter Mondale on stage during the balloon drop at the 1980 Democratic Convention, an example of a convention balloon drop that did not go as planned

The balloon drops at the 1980 and 2004 Democratic National Conventions were both considered poorly executed, with many balloons failing to fall as planned creating an unimpressive display that caused embarrassment for convention organizers. In 1980, very few balloons fell when then were intended to, except for certain pockets of the arena floor that saw too many balloons falling upon them. In 2004, many of the 100,000 balloons remained stuck in the nets with only a small number of balloons falling. During its broadcast of the 2004 Democratic National Convention, CNN notoriously aired live control room audio of convention producer Don Mischer reacting to the lack of balloons falling from the venue's rafters, in which Mishear was heard shouting, "Jesus, we need more balloons. I want all balloons to go.... No confetti. No confetti. No confetti. I want more balloons. What’s happening to the balloons? All balloons -- where the hell -- there’s nothing falling.... What the fuck are you guys doing up there?" The 2004 convention blunder has remained notorious.

Before the drop of 250,000 balloons at the 1988 Republican National Convention, balloon drops at conventions had hardly exceeded quantities of 50,000 balloons.

The low ceiling height of the venue for the 1996 Republican National Convention (the last major convention held in a convention hall, as opposed to a sports arena (other than the 2020 COVID conventions) created concerns about the ability to stage an adequate balloon drop. The balloon drop ultimately involved only one-third the amount of balloons as the drop at the 1996 Democratic National Convention.

Convention balloon drops by approximate number of balloons used
| Convention | Number of balloons | Note(s) | Cite |
|---|---|---|---|
| 1992 Republican | 250,000 | | |
| 1988 Republican | 200,000 | | |
| 2000 Democratic | 150,000–200,000 | | |
| 1996 Democratic | 150,000 | | |
| 2000 Republican | 150,000 | | |
| 2016 Republican | 125,000 | | |
| 2012 Republican | 100,000–120,000 | | |
| 2016 Democratic | 100,000–110,000 | | |
| 2004 Democratic | 100,000 | drop regarded as poorly-executed | |
| 2024 Republican | 100,000 | | |
| 2026 Republican | 100,000 | midterm-year (non-presidential) national convention | |
| 2024 Democratic | 100,000 | | |
| 1992 Democratic | 60,000 | | |
| 1996 Republican | 50,000 | low ceiling of the venue limited size of balloon drop | |
