= The Water Slide =

American documentary short film

The Water Slide is a 2018 documentary short film by Nathan Truesdell.

== Summary ==
A chilling look at the 2016 Verrückt water slide tragedy via news coverage and promotional footage.

== See also ==
- Class Action Park
