= A Derailment =

2026 documentary short film by Nathan Truesdell

- Directed by: Nathan Truesdell
- Produced by: Kat Nguyen; Will Lennon
- Edited by: Nathan Truesdell
- Music by: Longmont Potion Castle
- Distributed by: POV Shorts
- Release date: February 2026 (Big Sky Documentary Film Festival)
- Running time: 26 minutes
- Country: United States
- Language: English

A Derailment is a 2026 documentary short film by Nathan Truesdell about the 2023 East Palestine, Ohio train derailment.

== Synopsis ==
An examination of said derailment carrying toxic materials and it's aftermath (e.g. more derailments involving Norfolk Southern freight trains at other states like Alabama; Donald Trump's and Joe Biden's visits to East Palestine) via local news coverage and other publicly available footage.

== Production ==
The film is executive produced by fellow documentary filmmaker John Wilson while the music is performed by the metal group Longmont Potion Castle.

It is also part of Time Studios's collaboration with PBS's docuseries P.O.V..
