= Nathan Truesdell =

American film director

- Born: Clark, Missouri, U.S
- Occupations: Director, Cinematographer, Editor and Producer
- Years active: 2005–present

Nathan Truesdell is an Academy Award nominated independent filmmaker. He is best known for his work on the documentary films Balloonfest, Ascension, and The Water Slide.

== Life and career ==
Truesdell comes from Clark, Missouri where he spent the first 18 years of his life. He then realized the practicality of college and, nevertheless, attended the University of Missouri. He obtained his degree in computer science with a minor in mathematics.

His second documentary short film Balloonfest, premiered at American Film Institute and San Francisco International Film Festival. His documentary short film The Water Slide, premiered at American Film Institute and San Francisco International Film Festival.

In 2021, Truesdell produced and photographed Ascension, which went on to be nominated for the Academy Award for Best Documentary Feature Film at the 94th Academy Awards.

== Personal life ==
Truesdell is married to filmmaker Jessica Kingdon.

== Filmography ==
As Director

- 2026 - A Derailment
- 2025 - Mystery Seeds
- 2022 - When the LAPD Blows Up Your Neighborhood
- 2020 - It's Coming!
- 2019 - Lightning vs. Thunder
- 2019 - The Art of Making Money
- 2018 - The Water Slide
- 2017 - Balloonfest
- 2014 - Time to Talk About Jobs
- 2011 - Cinema Eye Honors

As Cinematographer

- 2026 - Art & Science Collide
- 2025 - Flood
- 2021 - Ascension
- 2020 - It's Coming!
- 2019 - Landing on Airwaves
- 2019 - The Art of Making Money
- 2017 - Chasing AllieCat
- 2017 - The Experimental City
- 2016 - Primaries
- 2016 - Speaking Is Difficult
- 2015 - Deprogrammed
- 2015 - Killing Them Safely
- 2014 - PFlat Black
- 2014 - Midterms
- 2013 - Caucus
- 2013 - We Always Lie to Strangers
- 2013 - Threshold
- 2013 - Dear Valued Guests
- 2012 - X-Ray Man
- 2012 - The Body of Richard Baker
- 2011 - Light the Water
- 2011 - Red Cloud
- 2011 - Lost & Found
- 2011 - Cinema Eye Honors
- 2010 - Big Birding Day
- 2009 - Real Super Heroes: Real Vigilantes
- 2009 - Convention
- 2007 - Steppin' Frat
- 2006 - Wrastlin
- 2006 - Midwest Muslim
- 2006 - Bio-Town

As Editor

- 2026 - A Derailment
- 2025 - Mystery Seeds
- 2022 - When the LAPD Blows Up Your Neighborhood
- 2020 - It's Coming!
- 2019 - Lightning vs. Thunder
- 2019 - The Art of Making Money
- 2018 - The Water Slide
- 2017 - Balloonfest
- 2015 - Killing Them Safely
- 2014 - Time to Talk About Jobs
- 2012 - X-Ray Man
- 2011 - Cinema Eye Honors
- 2010 - Big Birding Day
- 2009 - Convention
- 2007 - Steppin' Frat
- 2006 - Wrastlin
- 2006 - Midwest Muslim
- 2006 - Bio-Town

As Producer

- 2025 - Mystery Seeds
- 2023 - Balloon Boy
- 2022 - When the LAPD Blows Up Your Neighborhood
- 2021 - Ascension
- 2020 - It's Coming!
- 2019 - Lightning vs. Thunder
- 2019 - 8:08 - How We Respond
- 2019 - The Art of Making Money
- 2018 - How We Respond
- 2018 - The Gospel of Eureka
- 2017 - Balloonfest
- 2016 - Primaries
- 2016 - Peace in the Valley
- 2013 - Caucus
- 2013 - We Always Lie to Strangers
- 2013 - Dear Valued Guests
- 2012 - The Body of Richard Baker
- 2011 - Cinema Eye Honors
- 2009 - Convention
- 2005 - Song of the Dead
- 2024 - Balloon Boy

== Awards and nominations ==
Year	Result	Award	Category	Work	Ref.
2026	Won	Big Sky Documentary Film Festival	Best Short Documentary	A Derailment	
2026	Won	Independent Film Festival Boston	Best Documentary Short	A Derailment	
2025	Won	Tallgrass Film Festival	Outstanding Editing	Mystery Seeds	
2023	Nominated	Slamdance Film Festival	Best Documentary Short	When the LAPD Blows Up Your Neighborhood	
2023	Nominated	Florida Film Festival	Best Documentary Short	When the LAPD Blows Up Your Neighborhood	
2023	Won	San Diego Underground Film Festival	Jury Award	When the LAPD Blows Up Your Neighborhood	
2022	Won	Hamptons International Film Festival	Golden Starfish Award	When the LAPD Blows Up Your Neighborhood	
2022	Nominated	Academy Awards	Best Documentary Feature Film	Ascension	
2022	Won	Cinema Eye Honors	Outstanding Achievement in Cinematography	Ascension	
2022	Nominated	Cinema Eye Honors	Outstanding Achievement in Nonfiction Feature Filmmaking	Ascension	
2022	Nominated	Independent Spirit Awards	Best Documentary	Ascension	
2022	Nominated	International Documentary Association	Best Cinematography	Ascension	
2022	Nominated	Producers Guild of America Awards	Outstanding Producer of Documentary Motion Pictures	Ascension	
2021	Nominated	Critics' Choice Documentary Awards	Best Cinematography	Ascension	
2021	Nominated	Gotham Awards	Best Documentary	Ascension	
2019	Won	Tallgrass Film Festival	Outstanding Documentary Short	8:08 - How We Respond	
2018	Nominated	Chicago International Film Festival	Best Documentary Short	The Water Slide	
2017	Nominated	San Francisco International Film Festival	Best Documentary Short	Balloonfest	
