= Treb Heining =

American businessman and special effects artist

Treb Heining (born c. 1954) is an American businessman, inventor, and special effects artist best-known for creating large-scale balloon displays, large-scale confetti displays, and inventing designs for balloon-based decorations. He founded his company, BalloonArt by Treb, in 1979, and has been dubbed the "father of the balloon industry" and "the balloon guy". Heining has been responsible for orchestrating balloon drops at many major events in the United States (including Super Bowls, the Academy Awards, and those at presidential nominating conventions). He also has overseen the confetti displays at the annual Times Square ball drop since the ceremony held to ring in the year 1993.

== Biography ==
Heining is considered a pioneer in the ballon industry, even being dubbed "the father of the balloon industry" and "The Balloon Man". His career began with his first job the age of fifteen in the year 1969, with the humble start of a job selling balloons to parkgoers at Disneyland. In the 1970s, Heining ventured into inventing designs for balloon decorations, including inventing the balloon column. In 1979, he established BalloonArt by Treb, a company initially specializing in the creation balloon decorations for events and parties. That same year, he invented the balloon arch. Heining worked events for many celebrities. A large balloon arch he built for a party hosted by Elijah Blue Allman resulted in a photo of Allman's mother, Cher, underneath the arch. This photo of Cher brought Heining's arch design great attention, and resulted in an influx of costumer inquiries to his company.

Heining's company's work in large special events initially focused on event decoration for events such as shopping mall grand openings (one such example being the 1982 grand opening of the Grand Avenue Mall in Milwaukee, Wisconsin). However, as the 1980s progressed, Heining and his company ventured into designing balloon spectacles for major events. Heining oversaw a large scale balloon spectacle featured in the opening ceremony of the 1984 Summer Olympics. In December 1985, Heining and Tom Holowach arranged "Skyfest" at Disneyland, an event that was part of the park's 30th anniversary celebrations. The event set a Guinness World Record for largest number of balloons simultaneously released.

Heining provided his expertise to oversee Balloonfest '86 in Cleveland, an event which broke that same record he had earlier set at Disneyland. Balloonfest had unforeseen complications which marred it, as the released balloons drifted back over the city and Lake Erie and landed in the surrounding area, causing problems for traffic and a nearby airport. As a result, organizers faced lawsuits seeking millions of dollars in damages, and cost overruns put the event at a net loss. The event also interfered with a United States Coast Guard search for two boaters who were later found drowned.

Heining orchestrated a balloon release for the 200th anniversary celebration of the United States Constitution, held at Independence Hall in Philadelphia. He also orchestrated a ballon drop for the 200th anniversary celebration that year of the first inauguration of George Washington. That same year he orchestrated a balloon display in New York City for the 200th anniversary of the first inauguration of George Washington.

A fervent supporter of the presidency of Ronald Reagan, Heining published an op-ed in 2011 in which he recounted an experience in 1981 where he had erected an American flag balloon display across the street from Century Plaza hotel when Reagan was staying there to express his support for the president. At the time, Reagan's stay was attracting protests from those opposing him over his firing of air traffic controllers in response to the PATCO Strike. Heining recounted that his flag display expressed his support for the president's leadership. Heining created balloon displays for Reagan's second inauguration in 1985 and Reagan's vice president George H.W. Bush's own presidential inauguration in 1991.

In the 1980s, Heining also expanded his business into orchestrating large-scale balloon drops at special events. He has become a particularly noted expert for balloon drops, especially the balloon drops at major party United States presidential nominating conventions. He began orchestrating Republican National Convention balloon drops at the 1988 Republican National Convention, and has thus far been in charge of every Republican National Convention ballon drop since (most recently orchestrating the balloon drop at the 2024 Republican National Convention). He also orchestrated the balloon drops at the Democratic National Conventions of 2000, 2016, and 2024. He also acted as a consultant for balloon drops at other Democratic conventions.

Heining began working with organizers of the Times Square ball drop in 1991. At the end of the year 1992 (and start of the year 1993), Heining's company introduced a confetti effect to the Times Square ball drop that has continued to be used in the decades since, continuing to be supervised him as of New Years Eve 2025. In the 1990s, his in the balloon and special events industry landed him an interview slot in 1990s on the Late Show with David Letterman.

Disney Parks has contracted Heining to design balloon displays for events such as the grand opening of new attractions. In the 1990s, the company had Heining design the so-called "Glasshouse Balloon". A high-selling product, the balloon featured as a clear balloon containing a smaller big-eared Mickey Mouse shaped balloon inside of it. He has continued, in the decades since, to design balloons for Disney's theme park resorts. Other balloon designs Heining has invented include illuminated balloons.

=== Examples of spectacles at major events ===
Events Heining created balloon displays for include:

- balloon drops at Super Bowls (having done 18 of them by 2012)
- balloon drops at Academy Awards ceremonies (having done 5 of them by 2012)
- balloon drops at Republican National Conventions (1988, 1992, 1996, 2000, 2004, 2008, 2012, 2016, 2024, 2026)
- balloon drops at Democratic National Conventions (2000, 2016, 2024)
- 1984 Summer Olympics opening ceremony
- Balloonfest '86
- displays for United States presidential inaugurations

He has also orchestrated:

- Times Square ball drop confetti display (annually since 1992)
