= The Avenue (Milwaukee) =

Shopping plaza in Milwaukee, Wisconsin, U.S.

Coordinates: 43.0388°N 87.9142°W

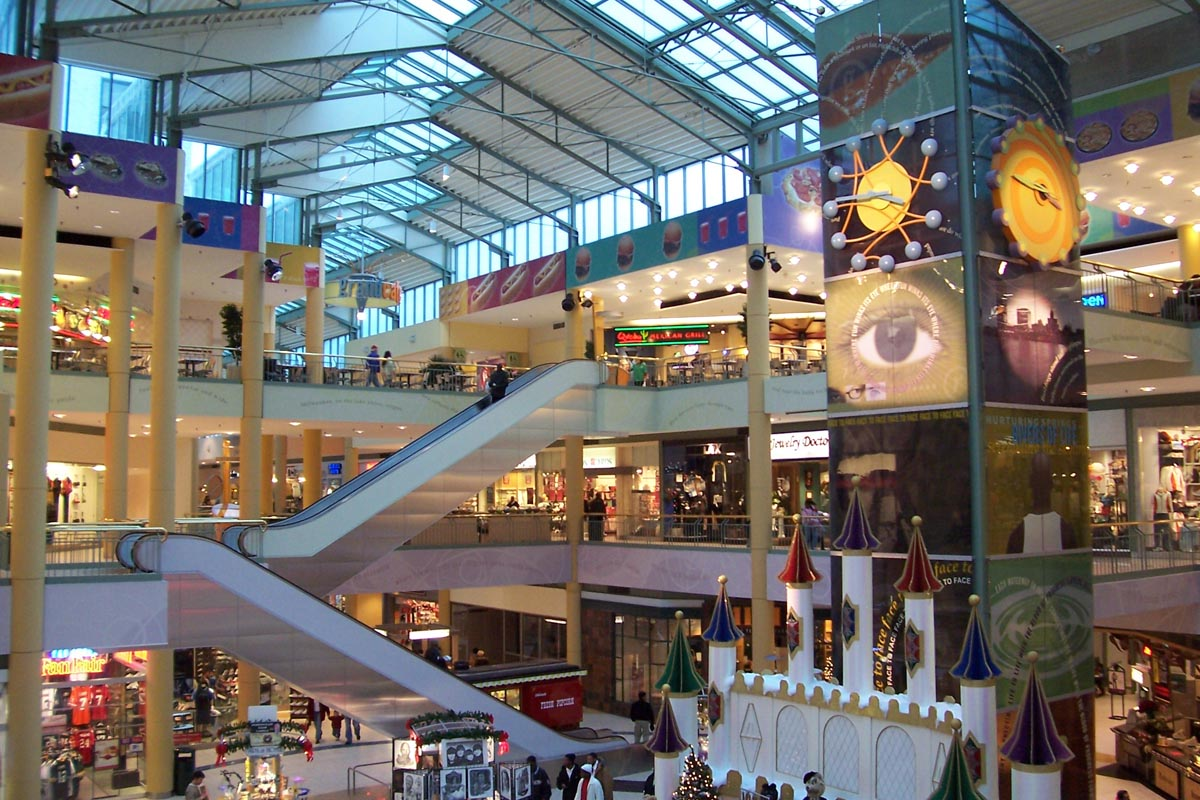
- Interior view (December 2005)
- Location: Milwaukee, Wisconsin, United States
- Address: 275 West Wisconsin Ave
- Opened: 1982; 44 years ago
- Previous names: Grand Avenue Mall (1982–2002); The Shops of Grand Avenue (2002–2017)
- Developer: The Rouse Company
- Manager: Hines & Irgens
- Owner: Interstate Development Partners and Hempel Companies
- Num. of stores: 80+
- Num. of anchor tenants: 5 (2 open, 3 vacant)
- Floor area: 367,968 sq ft (34,185.3 m^{2})
- Floors: 3
- Public transit: Milwaukee County Transit System
- Website: avenuemke.com

The Avenue (previously known as Grand Avenue Mall and The Shops of Grand Avenue) is an urban shopping center that spans three city blocks in the downtown neighborhood of Westown in Milwaukee, Wisconsin. There is one store anchored by T.J. Maxx and GRAEF-USA Incorporated, and three vacant spaces last occupied by Old Navy, OfficeMax, and Linens 'n Things.

The Avenue has been the only major indoor shopping facility in the city of Milwaukee proper with the closing of Capitol Court in 2000 and the Northridge Mall in 2003 due to competition from newly renovated malls in nearby suburbs.

== History ==
Grand Avenue opened in 1982 and hosted over 80 specialty stores, along with what was at one time the largest food court in Wisconsin. It was developed by Rouse Co. affiliate Rouse-Milwaukee, LLC.

The shopping center was named after a bustling merchant street during the 19th century, Grand Avenue (the portion of the present day Wisconsin Avenue west of the Milwaukee River). A main portion of The Shops of Grand Avenue encompasses the former Plankinton Arcade with many of its original features still intact including the statue of John Plankinton in the center of the circular atrium. The Arcade replaced the Plankinton House Hotel on the same site.

Grand Avenue was opened during a time when many downtown retail centers in major cities were shutting down. It sought to avoid these problems by relying on locally owned shops that cater to the "urban" tastes of the nearby populace, in addition to the national chain-stores it houses such as the anchor T.J. Maxx. Because of limited street/surface parking, an adjacent south ramp provides hourly fee parking, costs heavily offset by mall purchase validation.

At one time, the mall also featured Marshall Field's (Gimbels until 1986) on the east edge of the mall, but the location closed in 1997. The building that housed it, now ASQ Center, is still connected to The Avenue by a skywalk and features a Residence Inn, although it is not technically part of The Avenue. With the east addition of the downtown YMCA, their circling walking track has views down to Grand Plankinton Concourse through skylights.

On September 24th 1990 the famous serial killer, Jeffrey Dahmer, found one of his victims here.

TJ Maxx and Linens 'n Things were added in 2002.

In 2005, New York-based Ashkenazy Acquisition Corporation purchased The Shops of Grand Avenue for $31.7 million. Due to the economic downfall and its impact on the Milwaukee metropolitan area, by 2009 the mall had lost many key tenants. In 2012 the mall was foreclosed upon and was put up for auction in October 2013. New York based real estate firm Alliance Capital Invest won with a final bid of $16.5 million. After struggling to improve performance, the mall was sold to a local ownership group for $24.6 million in December 2015.

On December 6, 2018, new plans for the existing space were announced as well as the space's new name, The Avenue. The former third floor food court will become office space for GRAEF-USA Incorporated. A new food hall will open on the ground floor named 3rd Street Market Hall, late in 2019. In addition, the 52 unit Plankinton Clover Apartments will replace some of the former retail space.

== See also ==
- Statue of John Plankinton

== Gallery ==
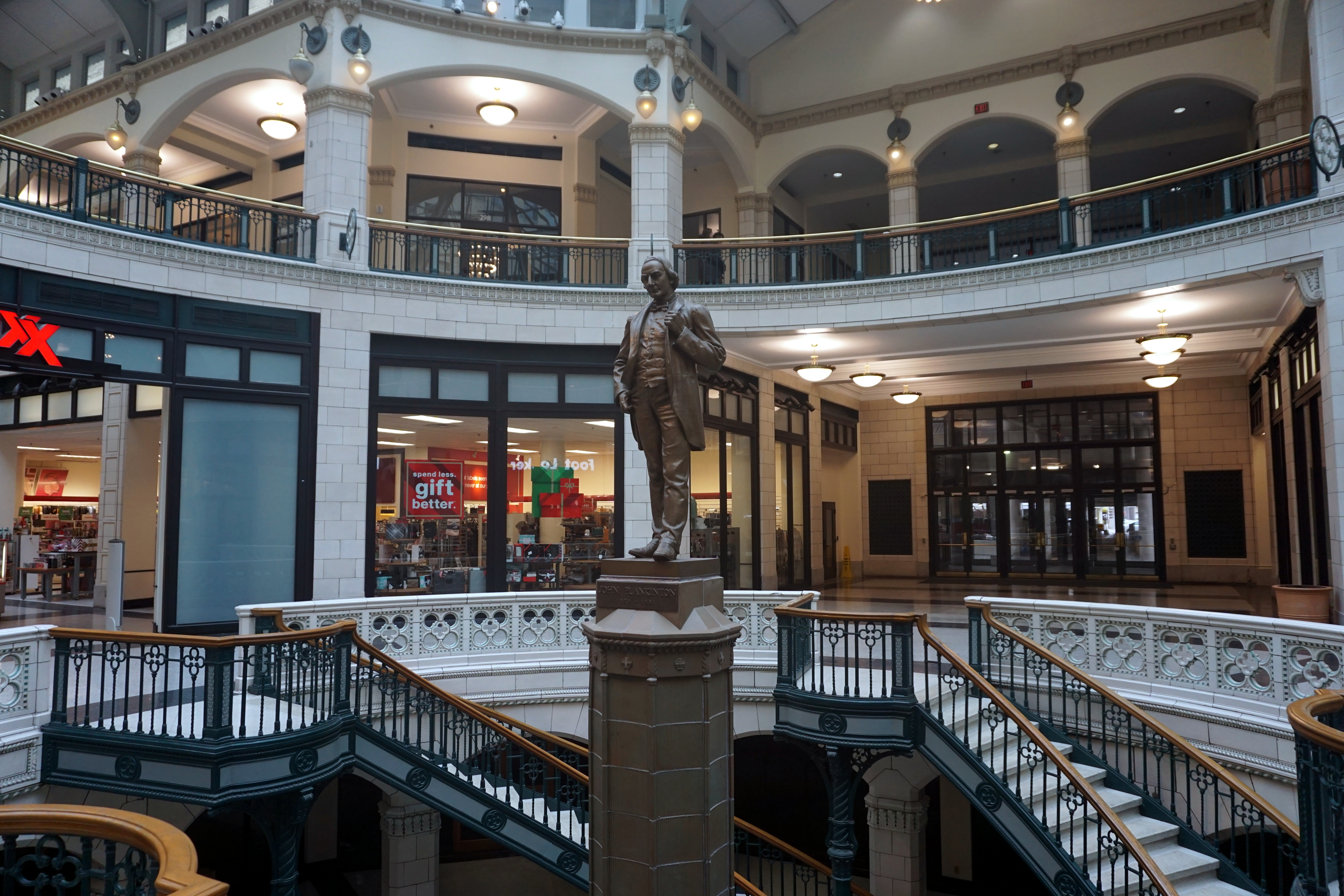
The rotunda of the Plankinton Arcade

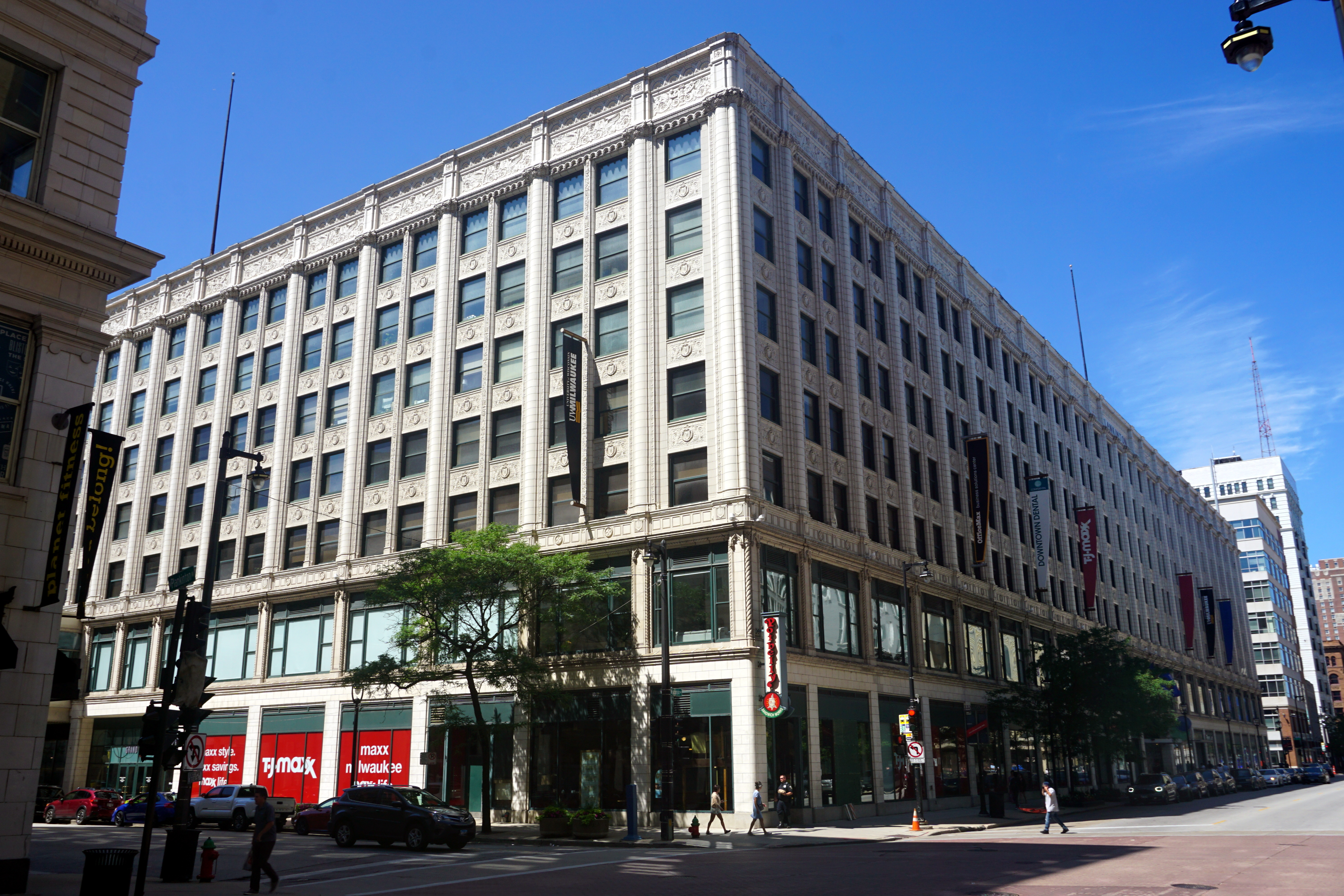
Exterior of the Plankinton Arcade

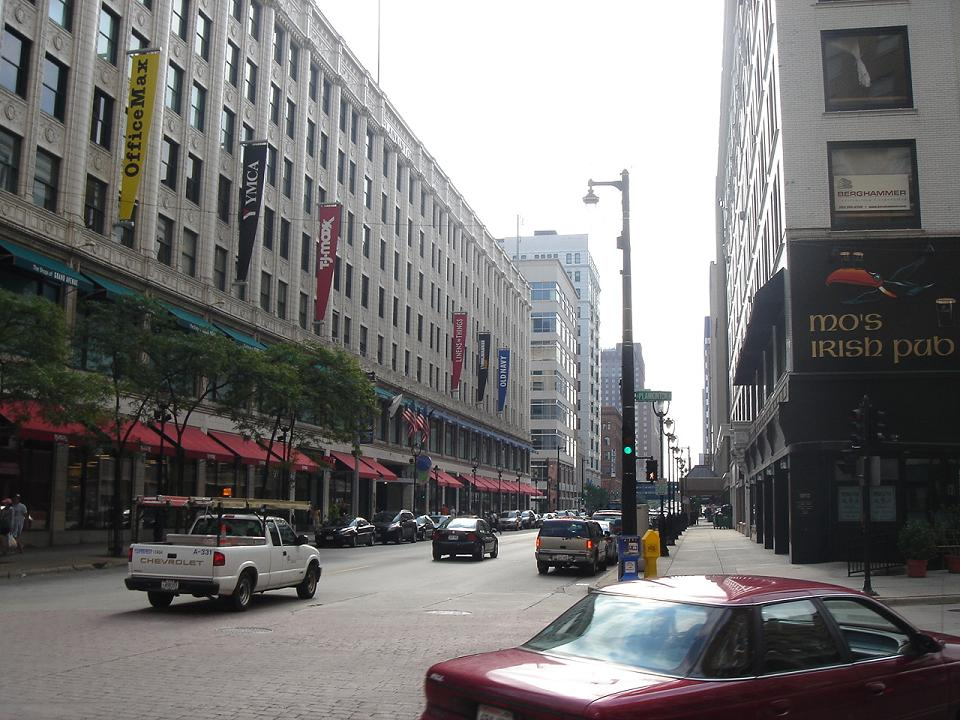
Outside of the Shops of Grand Avenue on Wisconsin Avenue

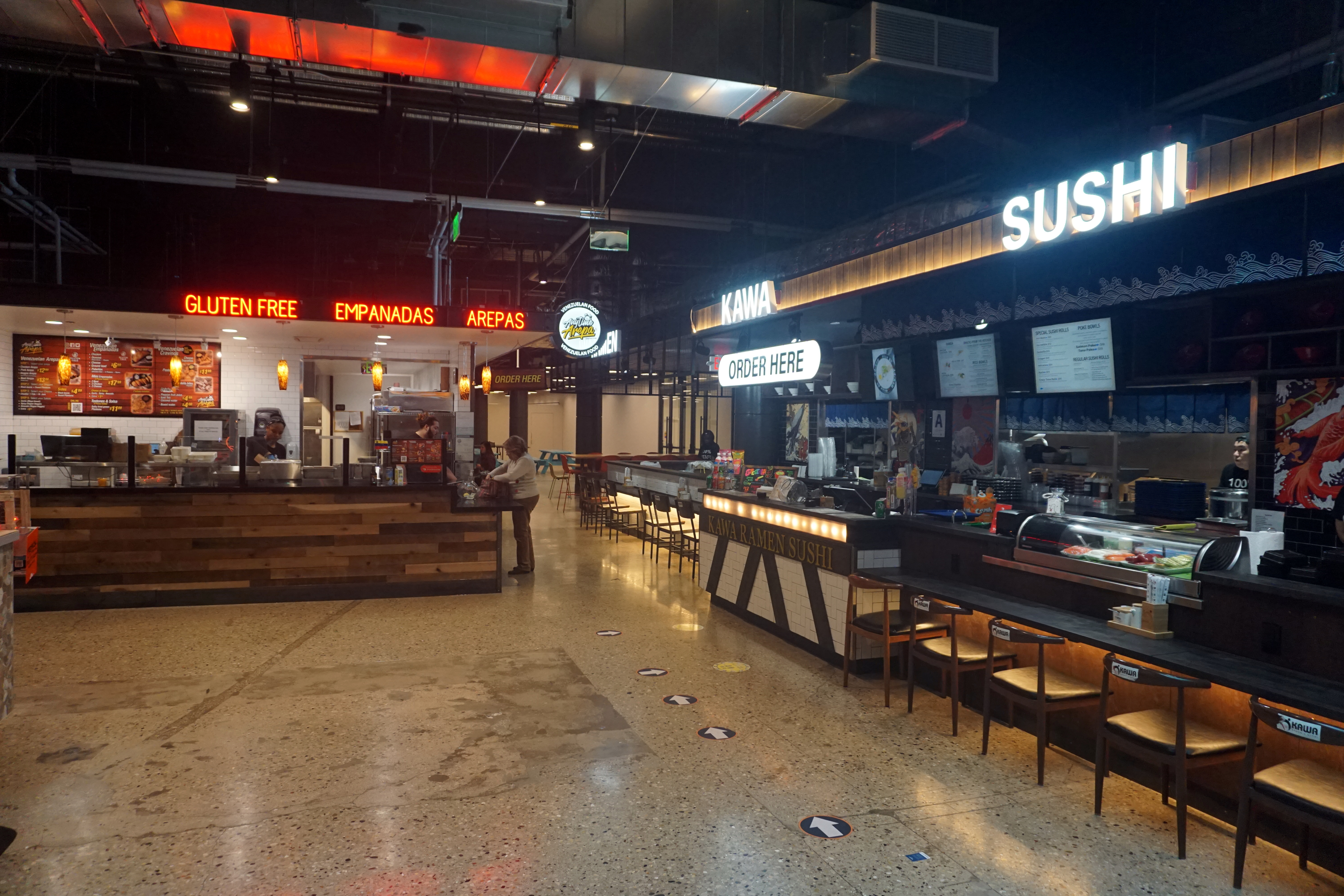
Interior of the 3rd Street Market Hall

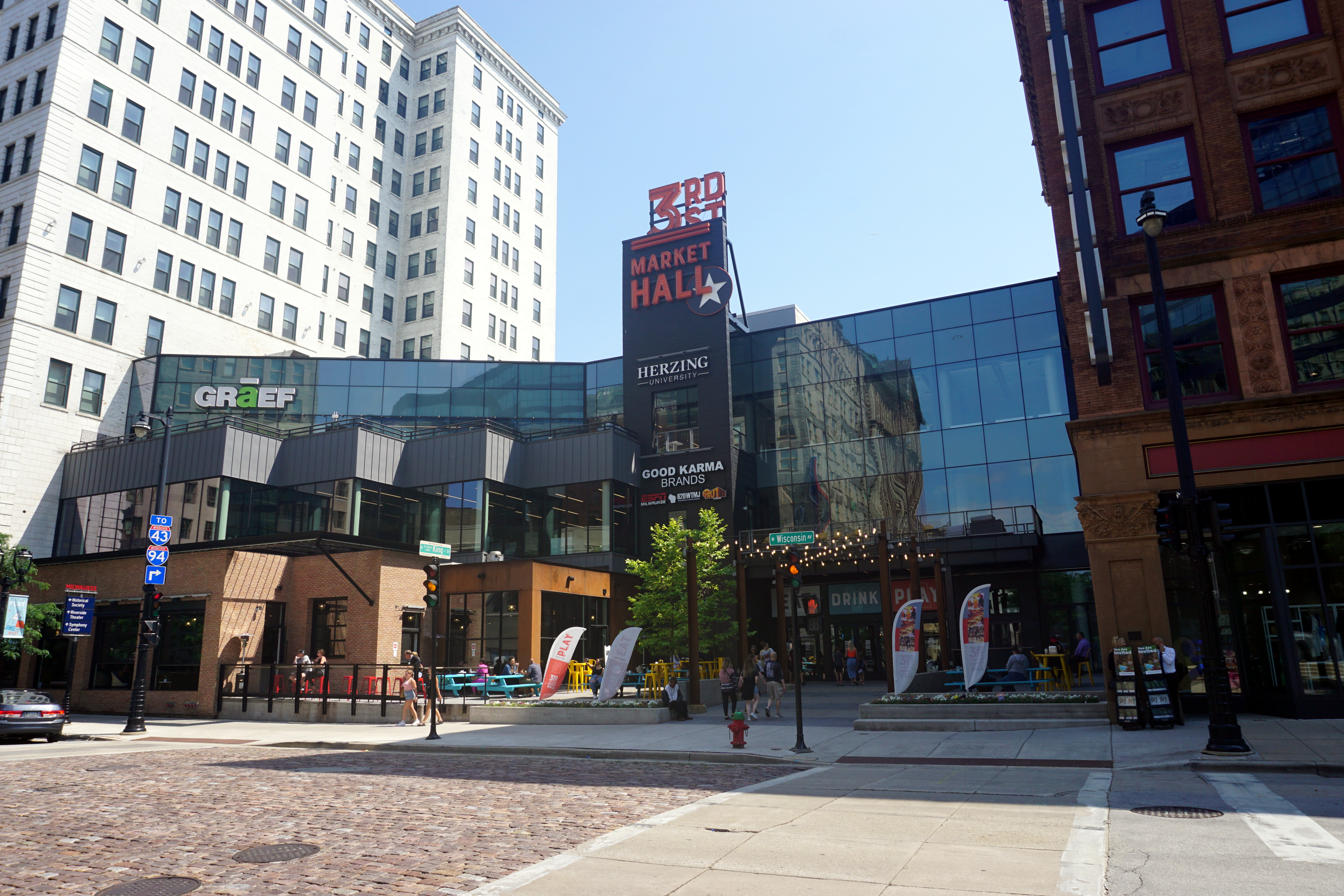
Exterior of the 3rd Street Market Hall
