= Children of Blood and Bone (film) =

Upcoming film directed by Gina Prince-Bythewood

- Theatrical release poster
- Directed by: Gina Prince-Bythewood
- Screenplay by: Gina Prince-Bythewood; Tomi Adeyemi
- Based on: Children of Blood and Bone by Tomi Adeyemi
- Produced by: Wyck Godfrey; Marty Bowen; Karen Rosenfelt; Matt Jackson
- Starring: Thuso Mbedu; Damson Idris; Amandla Stenberg; Tosin Cole; Cynthia Erivo; Lashana Lynch; Zackary Momoh; Richard Mofe-Damijo; Chiwetel Ejiofor; Regina King; Idris Elba; Viola Davis
- Cinematography: Polly Morgan
- Edited by: Terilyn A. Shropshire
- Music by: Terence Blanchard
- Production companies: Temple Hill Entertainment; Sunswept Entertainment; Jackson Pictures
- Distributed by: Paramount Pictures
- Release date: January 15, 2027
- Running time: 146 minutes
- Country: United States
- Language: English

Children of Blood and Bone is an upcoming American fantasy film directed by Gina Prince-Bythewood, who co-wrote the screenplay with Tomi Adeyemi, based on the 2018 novel by Adeyemi. The film stars Thuso Mbedu, Damson Idris, Amandla Stenberg, Tosin Cole, Cynthia Erivo, Lashana Lynch, Zackary Momoh, Richard Mofe-Damijo, Chiwetel Ejiofor, Regina King, Idris Elba, and Viola Davis.

Children of Blood and Bone is scheduled to be released by Paramount Pictures in the United States on January 15, 2027.

== Cast ==
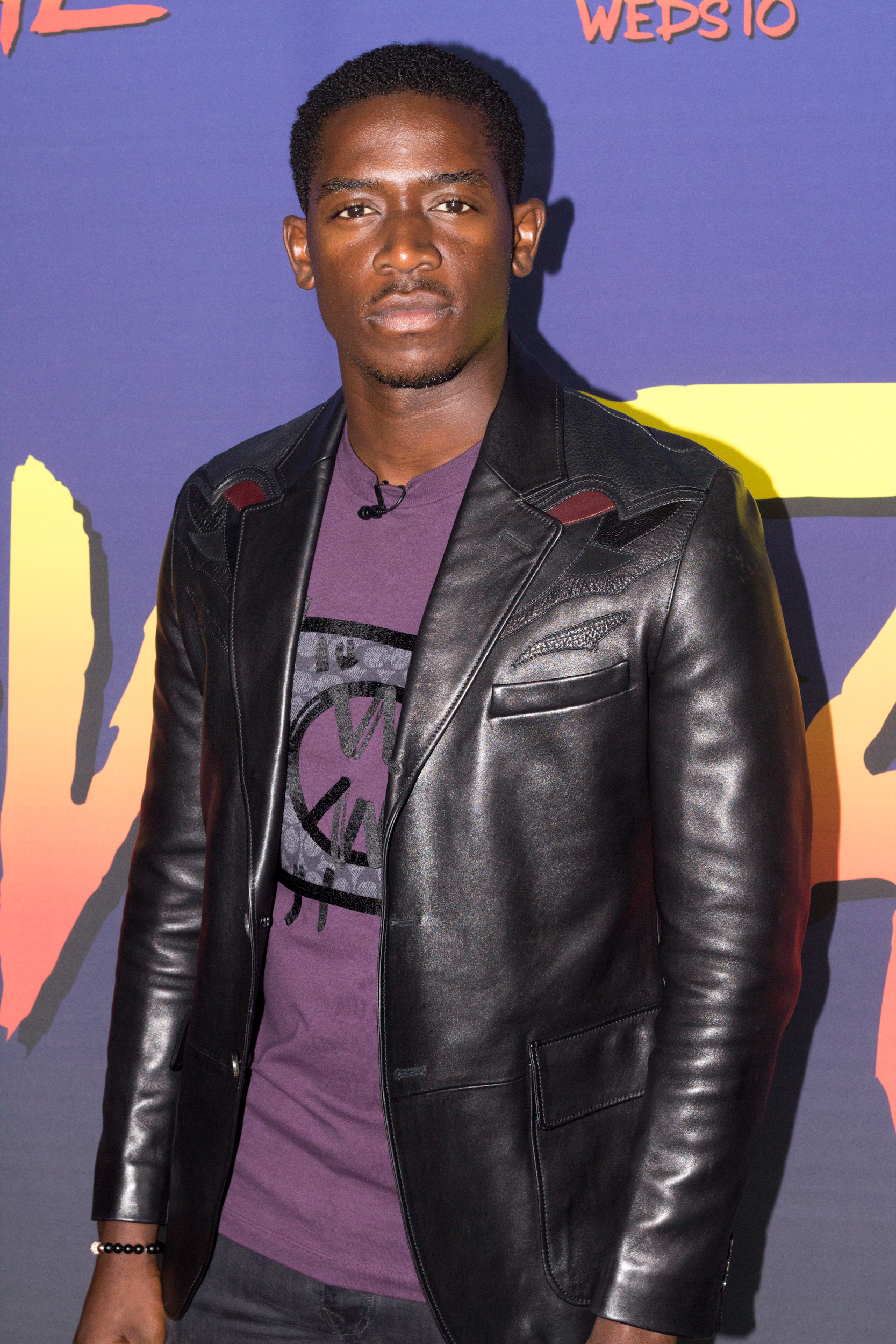
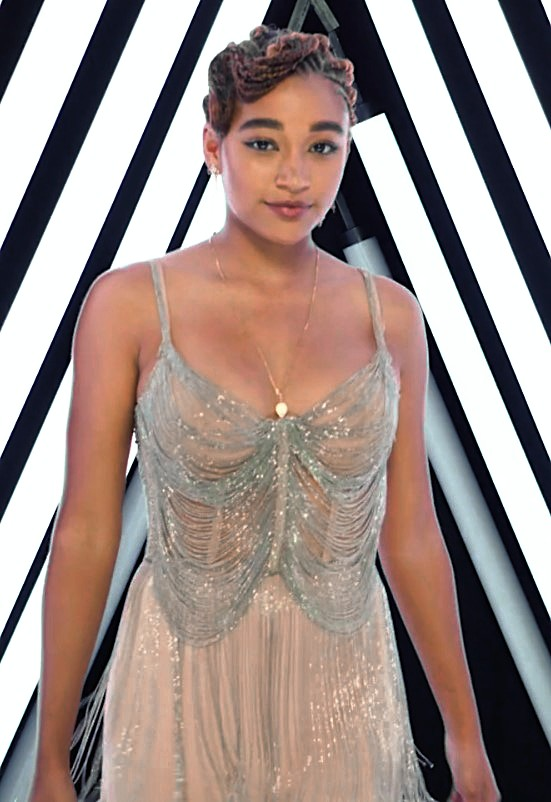
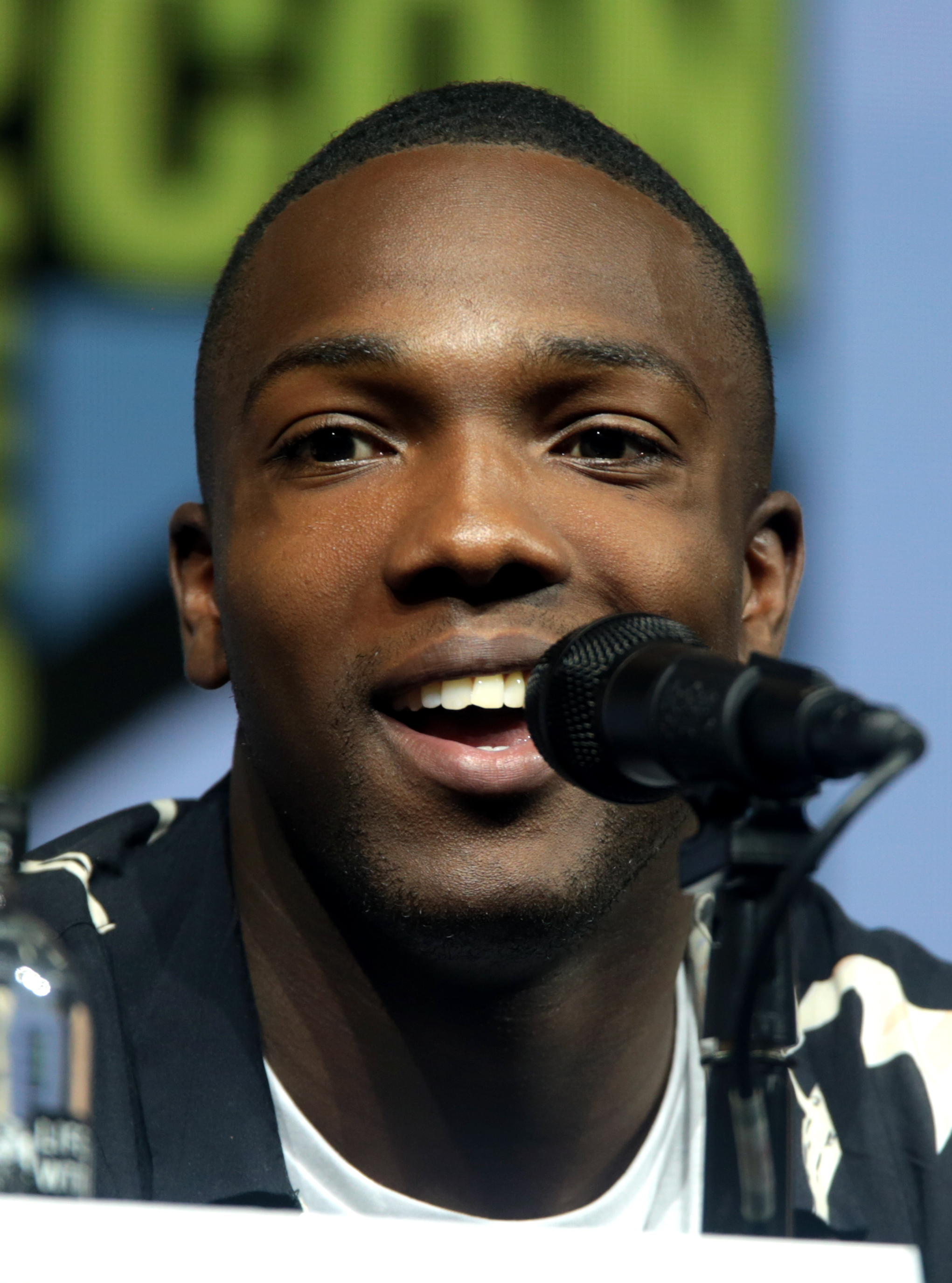
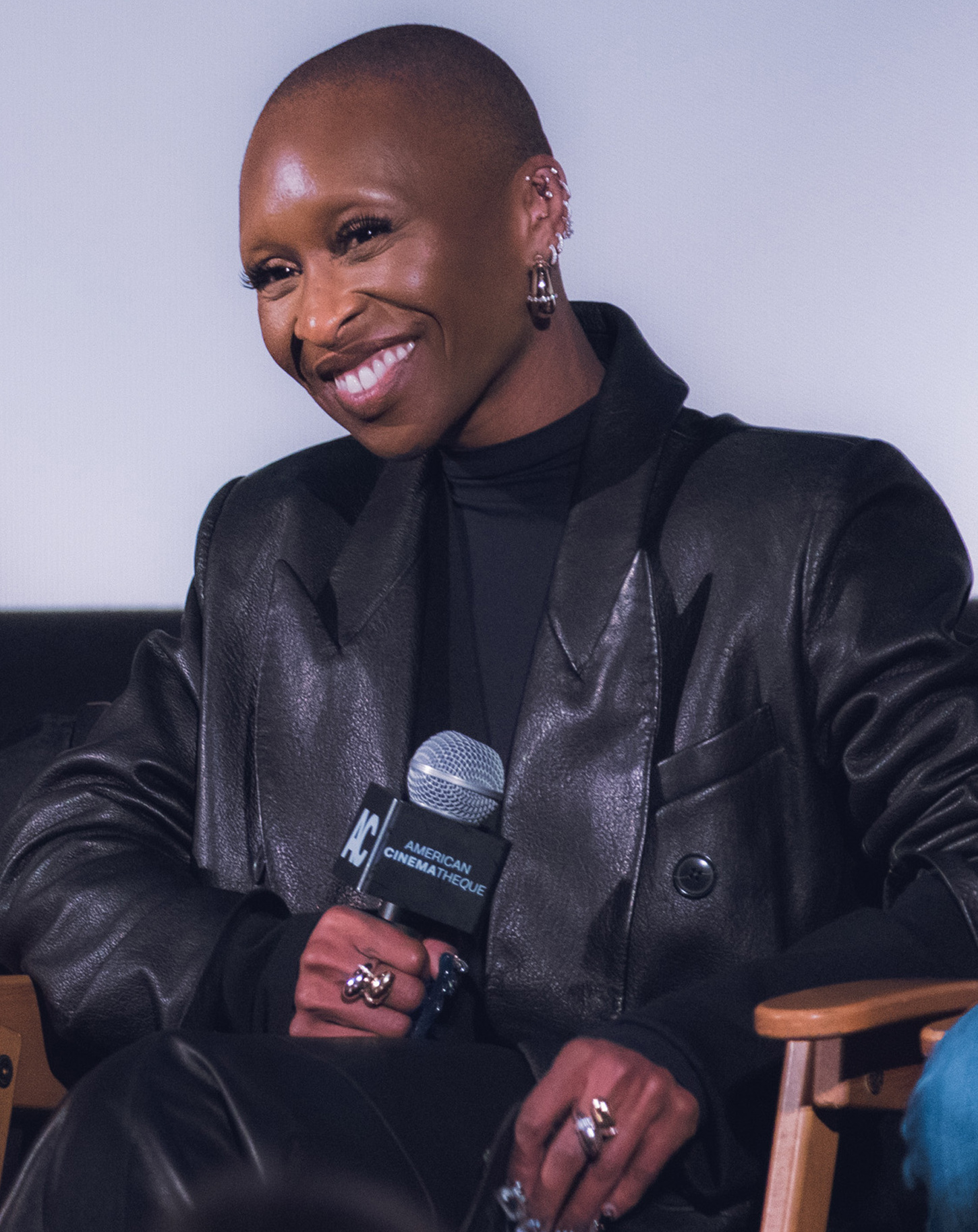
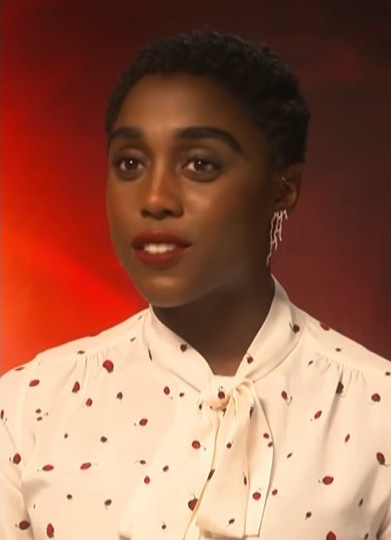
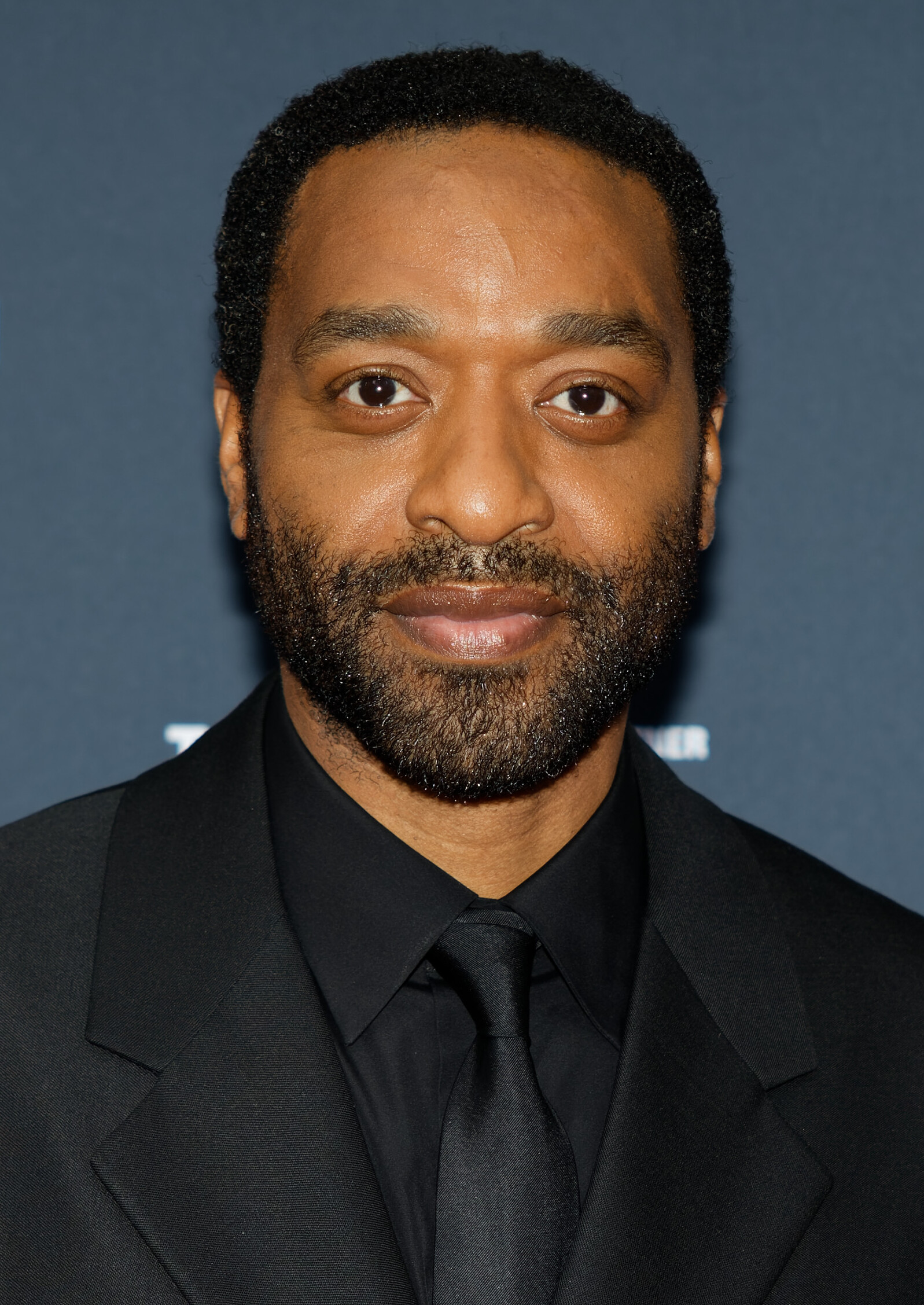
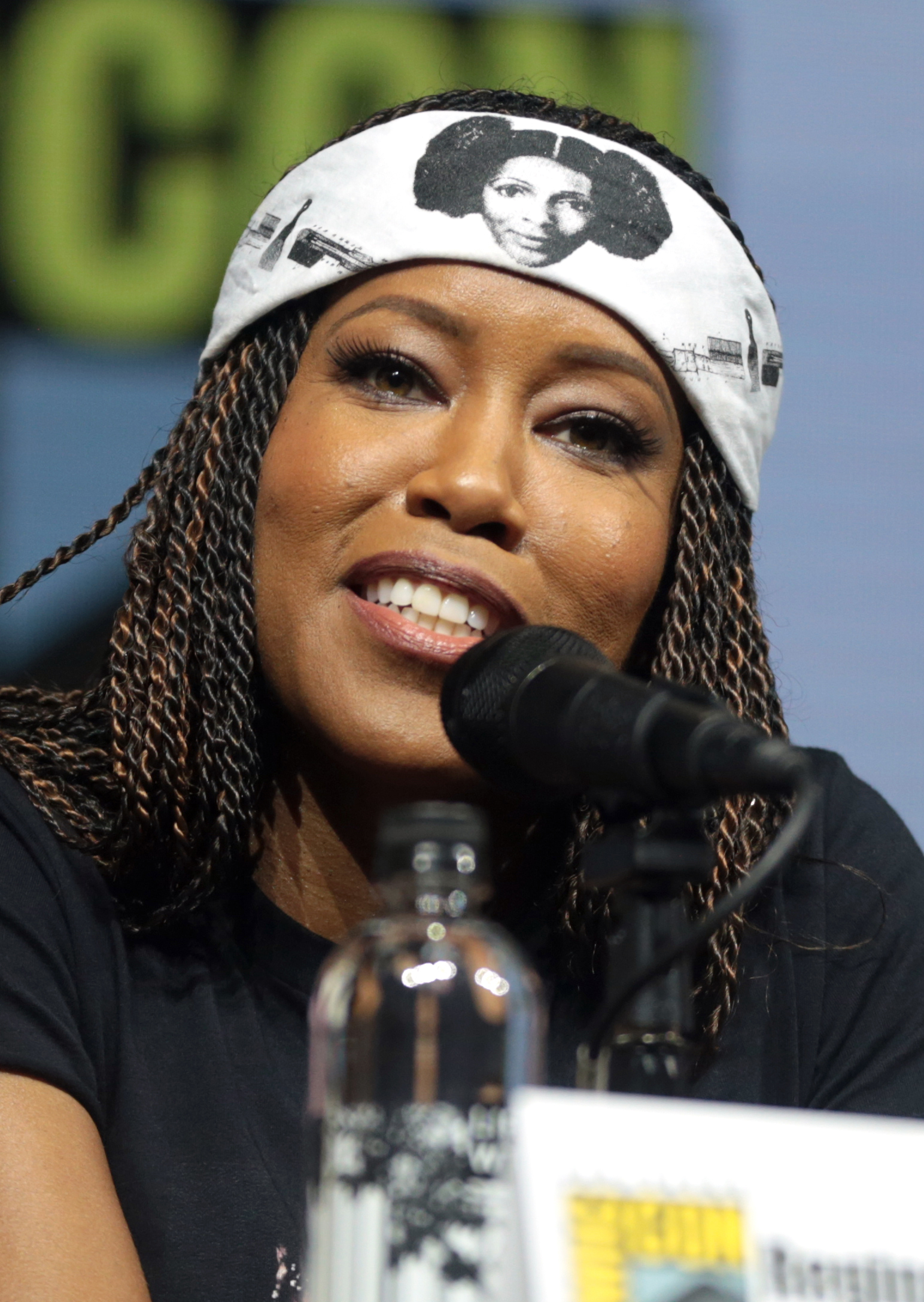
The ensemble cast of Children Of Blood and Bones includes Thuso Mbedu, Damson Idris, Amandla Stenberg, Tosin Cole, Cynthia Erivo, Lashana Lynch, Chiwetel Ejiofor, Regina King and Viola Davis.
- Thuso Mbedu as Zélie
- Damson Idris as Prince Inan
- Amandla Stenberg as Princess Amari
- Tosin Cole as Tzain
- Cynthia Erivo as Admiral Kaea
- Lashana Lynch as Jumoke
- Zackary Momoh as Adetayo
- Richard Mofe-Damijo
- Chiwetel Ejiofor as King Saran
- Regina King as Queen Nehanda
- Idris Elba as Lekan
- Viola Davis as Mama Agba
- Saniyya Sidney
- Diaana Babnicova as Folake
- Bukky Bakray as Binta
- Ayra Starr
- Shamz Garuba
- Kola Bodunde
- Pamilerin Ayodeji
- Temi Fagbenle

== Production ==
=== Development ===
Prior to publication, Tomi Adeyemi's novel Children of Blood and Bone was optioned for a film adaptation produced by Fox 2000 Pictures and Temple Hill Entertainment in March 2017. In February 2019, Rick Famuyiwa was announced as the director.

After the Walt Disney Company completed its acquisition of 21st Century Fox in March 2019, which resulted in shuttering Fox 2000, the project was transferred to Lucasfilm, marking the studio's first original live-action project since its acquisition by Disney in 2012. Kay Oyegun was announced to write the script for the film in August 2019. In September 2019, while talking to The Hollywood Reporter, Walt Disney Studios president Alan Horn confirmed Lucasfilm president Kathleen Kennedy was working with sister studio 20th Century Fox's chairwoman Emma Watts in developing the film. In the fourth quarter of 2021, however, Lucasfilm put the project in turnaround. According to The Hollywood Reporter, Adeyemi had become dissatisfied with the pace of Lucasfilm's adaptation efforts and asked to serve as scriptwriter, a request that Lucasfilm had declined. Since Lucasfilm had wanted to focus on its own intellectual properties like Star Wars, Indiana Jones and Willow, it allowed the film rights to Children of Blood and Bone to lapse.

By January 2022, Paramount Pictures had acquired the rights for a guaranteed exclusive theatrical release, with Temple Hill Entertainment producing alongside Sunswept Entertainment; Adeyemi would write the script and serve as executive producer. In December 2023, Gina Prince-Bythewood was hired to direct the film and further develop the script.

=== Casting ===
In September 2024, Thuso Mbedu was cast in the lead role. In January 2025, Amandla Stenberg, Damson Idris, Tosin Cole, Viola Davis, Cynthia Erivo, Idris Elba, Lashana Lynch and Chiwetel Ejiofor were added to the cast, with Regina King, Diaana Babnicova and Bukky Bakray in negotiations to join. In March, Saniyya Sidney, Zackary Momoh, Richard Mofe-Damijo, Ayra Starr, Pamilerin Ayodeji, Shamz Garuba, Kola Bodunde, and Temi Fagbenle rounded out the cast.

=== Filming ===
Principal photography began in Lagos in February 2025 and concluded on June 2, 2025.

=== Music ===
Terence Blanchard composed the score for the film.

== Controversy ==
The casting of Stenberg and Mbedu sparked online backlash over colorism, as they are lighter-skinned than the characters from the novel. In response to these criticisms, Stenberg posted an eight-minute TikTok video in February 2025, saying that Adeyemi wanted her in the role and that she "would never go after a role that [she] didn't feel like was right for [her] to chase."

In July 2026, Adeyemi revealed that she had distanced herself from the adaptation for unspecified reasons and that she had blocked Stenberg on social media, adding that, although she did not mind people seeing the film, she would not watch it and could not continue "being hurt and attacked behind the scenes". In a subsequent video in the same month, although she did not elaborate further on the behind-the-scenes fallout, she stated that she left the film's set "hyperventilating and sobbing", with many witnesses present, and called the experience "the worst thing I have ever had to live through".

In August 2026, Vanity Fair reported that Adeyemi's distancing was due to her strained relationship with Stenberg, stemming from her not approving of Stenberg's TikTok video response, culminating into tensions on the set when Adeyemi arrived to film her cameo appearance. The report noted that Adeyemi's recent statements were in stark contrast to previous statements in which she spoke positively about the film.

== Release ==
Children of Blood and Bone is scheduled to be released in the United States on January 15, 2027, including engagements in IMAX.
