= Tomi Adeyemi =

Nigerian-American novelist (born 1993)

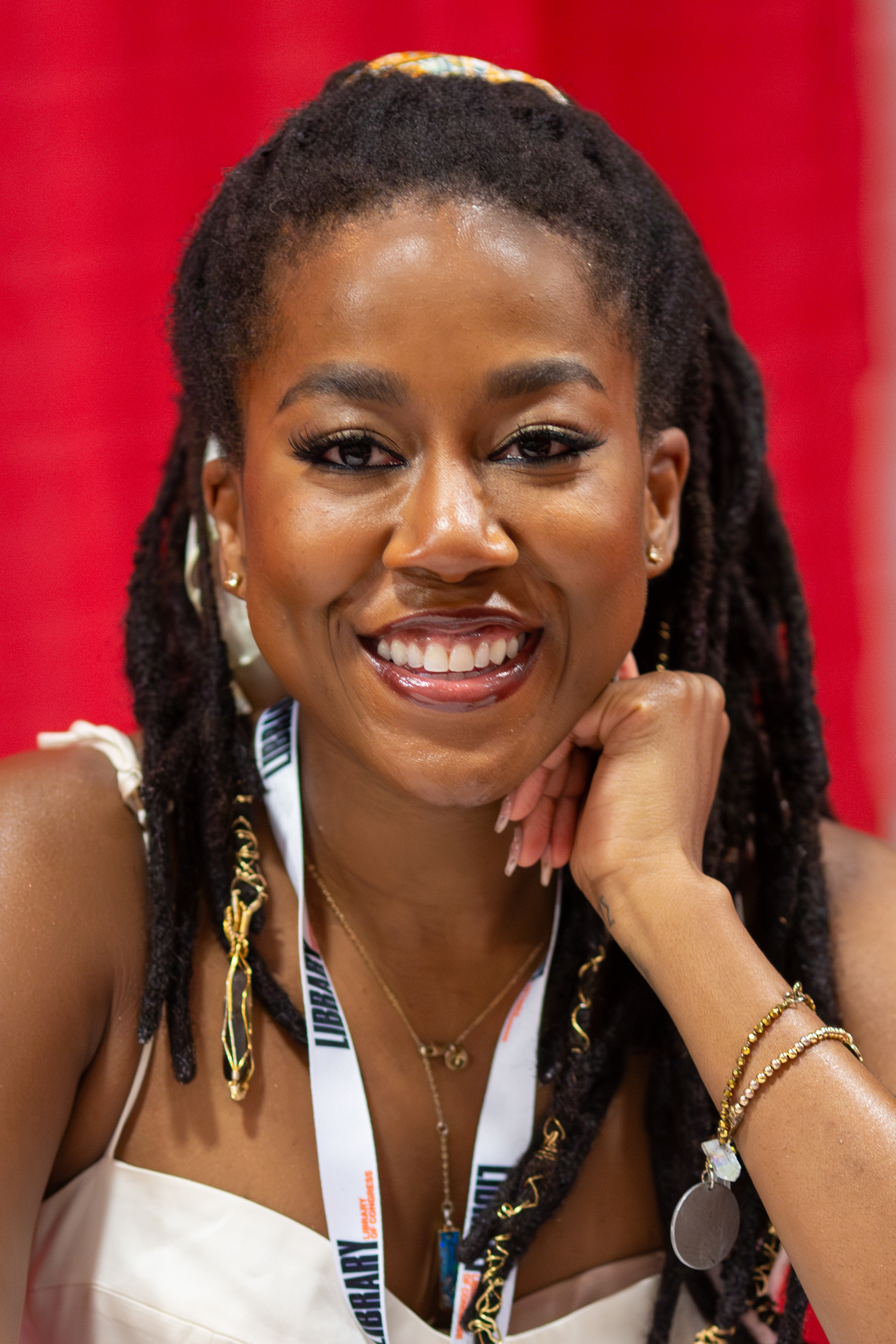
- Adeyemi at the 2024 National Book Festival
- Born: August 1, 1993 (age 33)
- Education: Harvard University (BA)
- Writing career
- Genres: Young adult fiction; Fantasy
- Notable works: Children of Blood and Bone (2018); Children of Virtue and Vengeance (2019)
- Notable awards: Andre Norton Award (2018); Lodestar Award (2019); Waterstones Children's Book Prize (2019); Time 100 (2020)
- Website: Official website

Tomi Adeyemi (born August 1, 1993) is an American writer and creative writing coach. She is best known for her novel Children of Blood and Bone, the first in the Legacy of Orïsha trilogy published by Henry Holt Books for Young Readers, which debuted #1 on The New York Times Best Sellers List, and won the 2018 Andre Norton Award for Young Adult Science Fiction and Fantasy, the 2019 Waterstones Book Prize, and the 2019 Lodestar Award for Best Young Adult Book. In 2019, she was named to the Forbes 30 Under 30 list and in 2020, she was named to the TIME 100 Most Influential People of 2020 in the "Pioneers" category. In 2022, Paramount Pictures was developing Children of Blood and Bone into a major motion picture with Gina Prince-Bythewood attached to direct.

== Early life ==
Adeyemi was born on August 1, 1993 in the United States to parents who emigrated from Nigeria. She is Yoruba. Her father was a physician in Nigeria but found employment as a taxi driver while he waited to transfer his qualifications. Adeyemi's mother worked as a cleaning woman. Adeyemi grew up in Chicago and was not exposed to her Nigerian heritage or Yoruba language as her parents decided not to teach her or her siblings their native tongue. She would later embrace her heritage as an adult, explaining, "I didn't think too much of it and I think that is the kind of an experience of the first generation. You're just trying to fit in. You don't realize how cool your culture is until you get out of that phase of trying to fit in." She would later describe one of her novels as a love letter to her culture.

Adeyemi wrote her first story when she was five years old, and continued to write throughout her teenage years. She graduated from Hinsdale Central High School in Hinsdale, Illinois in 2011. Adeyemi was qualified into the Hinsdale Central High School Foundation's Young Scholar Program in 2008 and went on to win their "Young Scholars" scholarship in 2010–2011. During her senior year, Adeyemi also received the Rani Sharma scholarship. She went on to graduate from Harvard University with an honors degree in English Literature, then studied West African mythology and culture in Salvador, Brazil, on a fellowship. It was this experience that inspired her to write Children of Blood and Bone, the breakthrough novel that would launch her career.

== Career ==
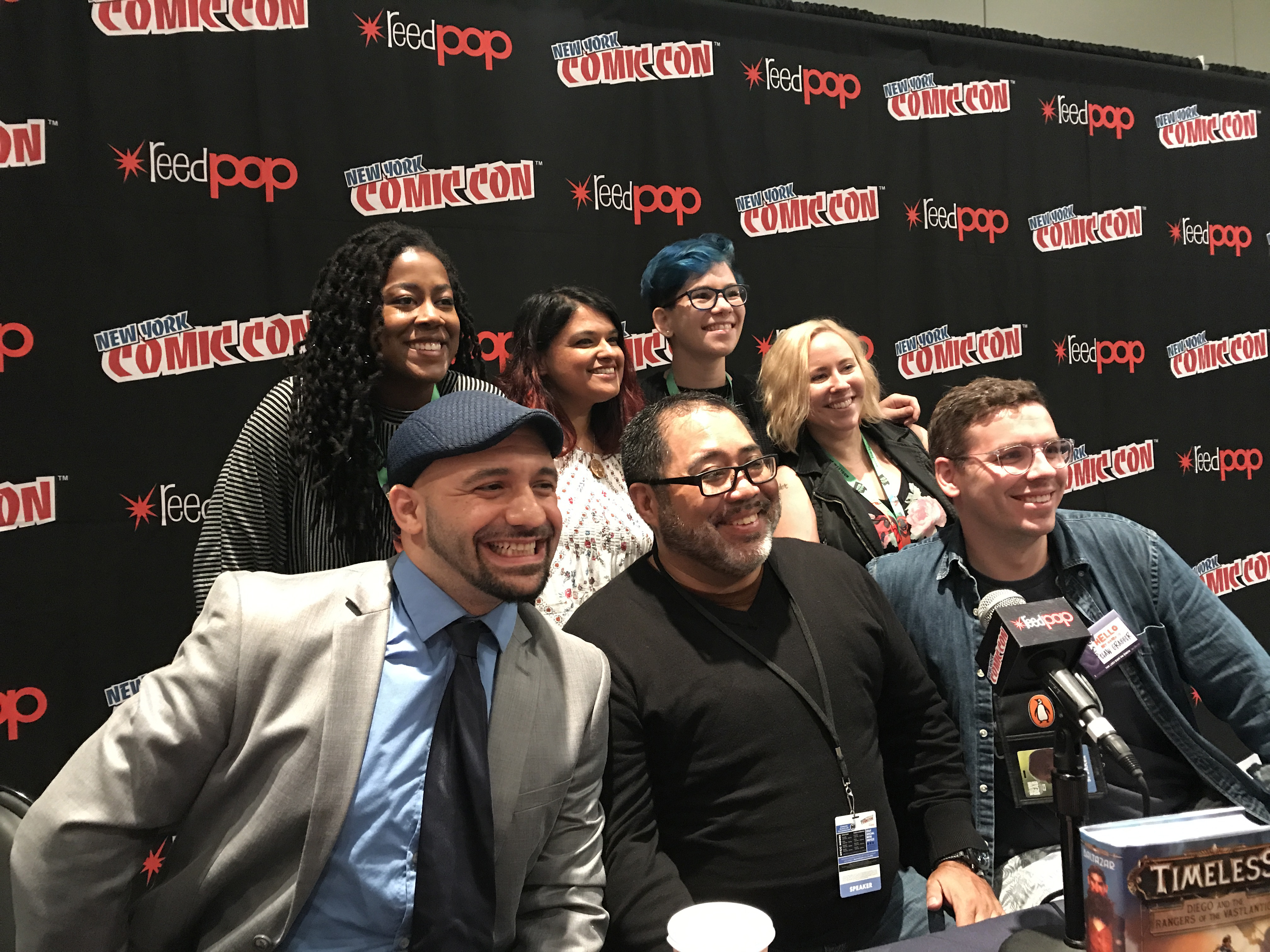
Adeyemi, top left, with other fantasy authors at a panel discussion at the 2017 New York Comic Con

After Adeyemi moved to California, she worked at a Los Angeles film production company. When she decided to reduce her hours there to write a book, her parents were not entirely accepting of this idea. Adeyemi said, "I'm first-generation Nigerian so I came out of my mother's womb and I was supposed to be a doctor, a lawyer or engineer, and I was like 'oh hey, I'm quitting my very well-paying job at a very stable company that has many future job opportunities for me' ... I'm so lucky that my parents were like, 'obviously we're not crazy about this but we love you'."

Adeyemi's first written novel did not yield positive feedback. She instead set herself a year to write another book that became Children of Blood and Bone, and she entered it into Pitch Wars, a competition program in which emerging writers are matched with editors and authors to revise their work before they submit it to a literary agent.

=== Legacy of Orïsha trilogy ===
Her debut novel, Children of Blood and Bone, was released in March 2018, and debuted at number 1 on The New York Times Young Adult Hardcover Bestseller List. It is a young-adult (YA) fantasy novel, featuring protagonist Zélie Adebola, who fights a monarchy to return magic to her people. Adeyemi has said she wanted to write a fantasy novel set in West Africa so that "a little Black girl [could] pick up my book one day and see herself as the star...I want her to know that she's beautiful and she matters and she can have a crazy, magical adventure even if an ignorant part of the world tells her she can never be Hermione Granger." Children of Blood and Bone was awarded the 2018 Andre Norton Award for Young Adult Science Fiction and Fantasy and is a finalist for the 2019 Lodestar Award for Best Young Adult Book.

In late March 2017, Fox 2000 Pictures purchased the film adaptation rights to the book. Reportedly the deals for the publishing and film rights were approximately seven figures. Deadline described it as "one of the biggest YA debut novel publishing deals ever."

In November 2018, Adeyemi accused Nora Roberts of plagiarizing the title of her novel, Of Blood and Bone from Children of Blood and Bone. Adeyemi later retracted the accusation saying "after talking to her, I believe our titles were created in isolation". Roberts later clarified that her book had been titled and submitted to her publisher one year before Adeyemi's. She also criticised Adeyemi's lack of fact checking and the fact that Adeyemi had not deleted the accusation a day later.

Adeyemi's second novel, Children of Virtue and Vengeance was pushed back from its initial release date of March 2019 to June 2019. Adeyemi later stated on her Instagram that her publisher offered her two choices: June 2019 and December 2019, but she chose the former so fans would not have to wait. The workload was too much and the author, editor, and publisher agreed to give the second book more time. Children of Virtue and Vengeance became a #1 New York Times Bestseller in December 2019.

In December 2020, Fox's new parent company Disney announced that its two subsidiaries Lucasfilm and 20th Century Studios would be adapting Children of Blood and Bone into a movie. By 2021, Adeyemi had become frustrated with the pace of Lucasfilm's film adaptation process. She asked to serve as scriptwriter, a request that Lucasfilm had declined. Since Lucasfilm had wanted to focus on its own intellectual properties Star Wars, Indiana Jones, and Willow, the company and 20th Century Studios had allowed their film rights to Children of Blood and Bone to lapse in late 2021. In mid–January 2022, Paramount Pictures acquired the rights for a guaranteed exclusive theatrical release, with Temple Hill Entertainment producing alongside Sunswept Entertainment. As part of the agreement, Adeyemi will write the script and also serve as executive producer. In mid–December 2023, it was announced that Gina Prince-Bythewood would direct the Paramount Pictures adaptation with Wyck Godfrey, Marty Bowen, Karen Rosenfelt, and Matt Jackson as executive producers.

In June 2024, Adeyemi released the final installment of the trilogy, Children of Anguish and Anarchy. The book debuted at #1 on the New York Times bestsellers list.

The film adaptation of Children of Blood and Bone, the first novel in the Legacy of Orïsha series, is scheduled to be released by Paramount pictures in the United States on January 15, 2027. The film is directed by Gina Prince-Bythewood (The Woman King) and stars Thuso Mbedu, Amandla Stenberg, Tosin Cole, Lashana Lynch, Regina King, Damson Idris, Cynthia Erivo, Idris Elba, Chiwetel Ejiofor and Viola Davis. In a TikTok posted on July 4, 2026, Adeyemi distanced herself from the upcoming film adaptation of Children of Blood and Bone, stating in a comment: "I’m just laying down my sword and officially separating my name because I can’t keep being hurt and attacked behind the scenes.” On July 29, 2026, Adeyemi further commented on the situation, calling the adaptation "the worst thing I’ve ever had to live through".

On September 29, Adeyemi's next YA novel The Siren was published. It follows a Dartmouth College freshman named Emery, who joins a mysterious group at the school called The Sirens. Adeyemi posed as Emery for its cover. The Guardian recognized that an author modeling as a novel's main character was "highly unusual"; she explained that it was her way of establishing "ownership" over her work. She also narrated the audiobook, which she called "the most fulfilling experience of my career".

== Other activities ==
While working on her debut novel Children of Blood and Bone, Adeyemi worked as a creative writing coach. In addition to her success as a novelist, Adeyemi teaches creative writing through her online course, The Writer's Roadmap. Her website has been named one of the "101 Best Websites for Writers" by Writer's Digest.

Adeyemi made a guest appearance in the final episode of Hermione Granger and the Quarter Life Crisis. In 2026, she made a cameo appearance in the comedy drama film The Devil Wears Prada 2.

Patrick Harpin and Everett Downing, Jr., creators of My Dad the Bounty Hunter, hired Adeyemi to work on the animated all-ages series, which had a majority-Black writers room.

== Personal life ==
Tomi Adeyemi lives in New York City, New York. She has two siblings. Her mother manages hospices just outside Chicago, her father is a doctor, and her brother is the musician Tobi Lou.

== Works ==
=== Legacy of Orïsha trilogy ===
- Children of Blood and Bone (March 6, 2018)
- Children of Virtue and Vengeance (December 3, 2019)
- Children of Anguish and Anarchy (June 25, 2024)

Companion books

- Awaken the Magic (journal) (April 7, 2020)

=== Standalone works ===
- The Siren (September 29, 2026)
