= Gotham Independent Film Award for Outstanding Performance in a New Series =

Annual US film award

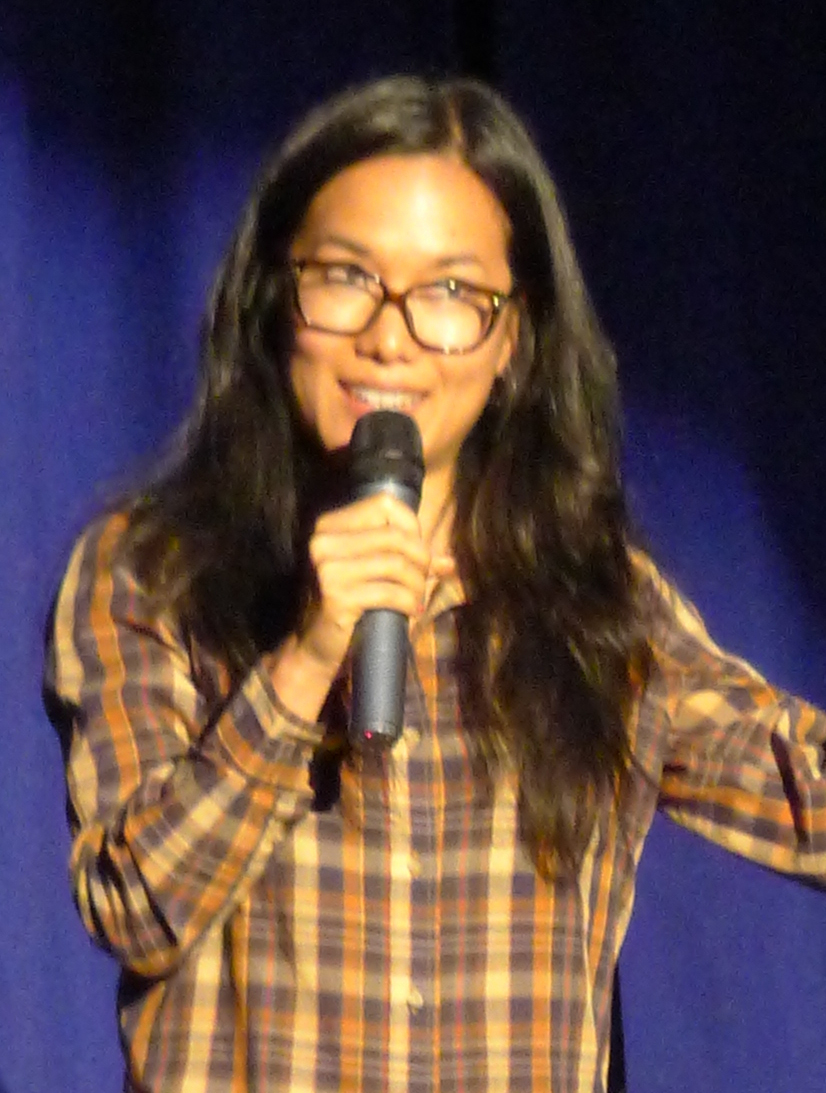
- Country: United States
- Presented by: The Gotham Film & Media Institute
- First award: 2021
- Currently held by: Ali Wong for Beef (2023)
- Website: awards.thegotham.org

The Gotham Independent Film Award for Outstanding Performance in a New Series is one of the annual Gotham Awards and was first awarded in 2021.

It is a gender neutral award honoring performances in new television series.

== Winners and nominees ==
=== 2020s ===
Year	Winner and nominees	Series	Role	Network	Ref.
2021	Ethan Hawke	The Good Lord Bird	John Brown	Showtime	
2021	Thuso Mbedu	The Underground Railroad	Cora Randall	Prime Video	
2021	Jennifer Coolidge	The White Lotus	Tanya McQuoid	HBO	
2021	Michael Greyeyes	Rutherford Falls	Terry Thomas	Peacock	
2021	Devery Jacobs	Reservation Dogs	Elora Danan Postoak	FX	
2021	Lee Jung-jae	Squid Game	Seong Gi-hun	Netflix	
2021	Jean Smart	Hacks	Deborah Vance	HBO Max	
2021	Omar Sy	Lupin	Assane Diop	Netflix	
2021	Anya Taylor-Joy	The Queen’s Gambit	Beth Harmon	Netflix	
2021	Anjana Vasan	We Are Lady Parts	Amina	Peacock	
2022	Ben Whishaw	This Is Going to Hurt	Adam Kay	AMC+	
2022	Bilal Baig	Sort Of	Sabi Mehboob	HBO Max	
2022	Ayo Edebiri	The Bear	Sydney Adamu	FX on Hulu	
2022	Janelle James	Abbott Elementary	Ava Coleman	ABC	
2022	Kim Min-ha	Pachinko	Teenage Kim Sunja	Apple TV+	
2022	Matilda Lawler	Station Eleven	Young Kirsten Raymonde	HBO Max	
2022	Britt Lower	Severance	Helly R.	Apple TV+	
2022	Melanie Lynskey	Yellowjackets	Shauna Shipman	Showtime	
2022	Zahn McClarnon	Dark Winds	Joe Leaphorn	AMC/AMC+	
2022	Sue Ann Pien	As We See It	Violet Wu	Prime Video	
2023	Ali Wong	Beef	Amy Lau	Netflix	
2023	Jacob Anderson	Anne Rice's Interview with the Vampire	Louis de Pointe du Lac	AMC	
2023	Dominique Fishback	Swarm	Andrea "Dre" Greene	Prime Video	
2023	Jharrel Jerome	I'm a Virgo	Cootie	Prime Video	
2023	Natasha Lyonne	Poker Face	Charlie Cale	Peacock	
2023	Bel Powley	A Small Light	Miep Gies	National Geographic	
2023	Bella Ramsey	The Last of Us	Ellie	HBO	
2023	Chaske Spencer	The English	Sgt. Eli Whipp / Wounded Wolf	Prime Video	
2023	Rachel Weisz	Dead Ringers	Beverly and Elliot Mantle	Prime Video	
2023	Steven Yeun	Beef	Danny Cho	Netflix	

== See also ==
- Independent Spirit Award for Best Female Performance in a New Scripted Series
