= Children of Blood and Bone =

2018 young adult Afro-fantasy novel by Tomi Adeyemi

- The cover art of Children of Blood and Bone
- Author: Tomi Adeyemi
- Cover artist: Rich Deas
- Language: English
- Series: Legacy of Orïsha
- Genre: Young adult, Romantic fantasy, Afro-fantasy
- Publisher: Henry Holt Books for Young Readers
- Publication date: March 6, 2018
- Publication place: Nigeria
- Media type: Print (hardcover and paperback), audiobook, e-book
- Pages: 525
- ISBN: 978-1-250-17097-2
- Followed by: Children of Virtue and Vengeance

Children of Blood and Bone is a 2018 young adult romantic fantasy novel by Nigerian-American novelist Tomi Adeyemi. The book, Adeyemi's debut novel and the first in her Legacy of Orïsha trilogy, follows heroine Zélie Adebola as she attempts to restore magic to the kingdom of Orïsha, following the ruling class kosidáns' brutal suppression of the class of magic practitioners Zélie belongs to, the maji.

Writing the book over 18 months and 45 drafts, Adeyemi drew inspiration from novels like Harry Potter and An Ember in the Ashes as well as West African mythology and the Yoruba culture and language. The hopelessness she felt at police shootings of black Americans also motivated her to develop the story. The book received one of the largest young adult publishing deals ever, including preemptive sale of film rights to Fox 2000 Pictures. Debuting at number one on The New York Times Best Seller list for young adult books, the novel received mostly positive reviews. Critics wrote about its examination of oppression, racism, and slavery, with the kosidán and maji serving as stand-ins for real-world groups. It is also a coming-of-age story as the characters discover their abilities to help shape the world through their actions.

== Plot ==
The novel takes place in the fictional country of Orïsha, presumably somewhere in an alternate pre-colonial Nigeria and inhabited by two distinct people: divîners (who can become magical maji and who manifest white hair) and non-magical kosidán. Eleven years prior to the events of the book, King Saran figured out how to switch off magic and ordered the slaying of many defenseless divîners, including the mother of Zélie Adebola. Since that time, divîners have experienced severe oppression. After visiting the capital city, Lagos, to make enough money to pay off an increased tax on divîners, Zélie and her brother Tzain help a noble girl flee the clutches of local guards. This girl, who turns out to be Princess Amari, the daughter of King Saran, has stolen a magical scroll that can restore the magical powers of any divîner who touches it. Amari stole the scroll because after her servant and best friend, Binta, touched it and her powers came to life, King Saran killed her. Like her mother before her, Zélie can awaken her magical powers as a Reaper, giving her the power to command undead spirits.

Pursued by a contingent of guards led by Amari's brother Prince Inan and Admiral Kaea, the three travel to the temple of the maji, Chândomblé. The temple's remaining priest, Lekan, tells them that they must use the scroll, the bone dagger that he gives them, and an artifact called the sunstone to perform a ritual to renew the connection between the maji and the gods, who are the source of all magic. He performs a rite on Zélie so she can complete the connection, and then he sacrifices himself to hold off the guards as the trio escapes. Unknown to anyone else, contact with the scroll has given Prince Inan magical abilities to detect the feelings and memories of others. Kaea catches Inan using these abilities to track the trio, and Inan accidentally uses his magic to kill her.

The trio finds themselves in Ibeji, where the sunstone is used as a prize for deadly aquatic arena games. They agree to compete, and Zélie uses her powers to win the sunstone. Now in possession of all three artifacts, the group continues moving until Inan catches up. In the chaos that follows, Tzain and Amari are captured in the forest by an unknown group. Inan agrees to help Zélie rescue their siblings. During the rescue, they learn that the group is a settlement of divîners, some of whom have had their powers reawakened when they were exposed to the scroll before the King's forces took it.

Upon hearing of the group's mission, the divîners decide to hold a festival for the Sky Mother where the remaining divîners can touch the scroll. By this time, Inan, who has developed romantic feelings for Zélie, has agreed to help restore magic. However, Saran and his guards find and destroy the camp, capturing Zélie. During the fight between the guards and the divîners, Kwame, a maji able to control fire, uses his magic to self-immolate and takes out guards with him. This display of powerful magic scares Inan, who changes his mind again and wants to repress his magic, knowing that his father would kill him should he ever reveal that he is a maji. Saran tortures Zélie to learn how to destroy the scroll, removing her magical ability in the process.

Tzain and Amari assemble a team and break Zélie out of prison. Zélie does not reveal her power loss, and they hire a group of mercenaries, commanded by Roen, who allow them to infiltrate the secret island and temple to perform the ceremony. Once inside, however, they are ambushed by Saran and Inan, who are holding Zélie and Tzain's father. Feeling helpless, Zélie agrees to give the artifacts up in exchange for her and her father's lives. As Zélie leaves the temple, Saran orders her father to be killed anyway. The spirit and blood magic of her father reawakens Zélie's magic and she uses her restored powers to attack the kosidán. Inan uses her rage and magic to his advantage as he provokes an attack that destroys the scroll. Without thinking, Inan uses his magic to stop an attack on Saran. Saran then attempts to kill his son for being a secret maji, but is instead killed by a furious Amari.

Unable to repair the scroll, Zélie uses blood magic and an incantation of her own devising to complete the ritual, which kills her in the process. Zélie can then speak with her mother on behalf of the gods in the afterlife, who praise her and send her back. The book concludes as Zélie learns that Amari now has magic.

== Characters ==
- Zélie Adebola: A fierce and determined young woman from the floating village of Ilorin. As the daughter of a powerful sorceress, she inherited an aptitude for magic, but her innate connection to forbidden diviner spirits sets her apart and draws the attention of the tyrannical King Saran. Despite the risks, Zélie refuses to turn a blind eye to the injustices her people face and embarks on a perilous journey to overthrow the oppressive regime.
- Tzain Adebola: Zélie's older brother, is a skilled warrior and a loyal protector. He shares his sister's passion for justice and stands by her side throughout their adventure. Tzain's unwavering belief in Zélie's abilities and his willingness to sacrifice everything for her cause make him a formidable force in their quest.
- Princess Amari: A strong-willed and compassionate young woman. Despite being raised in the lap of luxury, she harbors a deep sense of empathy for the oppressed. When she crosses paths with Zélie and Tzain, she is drawn to their cause and offers her support. Amari's knowledge of the royal court and her ability to navigate the treacherous waters of politics prove invaluable to the resistance.
- Prince Inan: Amari's enigmatic brother. He is a skilled swordsman and a charismatic leader. However, he harbors a secret that weighs heavily on his mind. As Zélie's quest unfolds, Inan's conflicted loyalties force him to make difficult choices that will shape the fate of both his kingdom and the revolution.
- King Saran: Ruler of Orïsha, is a cruel and ruthless tyrant. Driven by an insatiable lust for power, he has established a reign of terror over the land. Saran's immense hate for the maji makes him a formidable foe. Zélie and her comrades must find a way to defeat Saran's tyranny and restore balance to Orïsha.
- Admiral Kaea Roen: is a skilled naval commander. She joins forces with Zélie and her allies, bringing with her a powerful fleet and a deep understanding of the sea's secrets. Kaea's strategic brilliance and unwavering determination make her a valuable asset in the fight against King Saran.

== Development and inspiration ==
Tomi Adeyemi had worked unsuccessfully on a manuscript for three years before beginning Children of Blood and Bone. The idea for the novel came after a trip to Brazil: "I was in a gift shop there and the African gods and goddesses were depicted in such a beautiful and sacred way ... it really made me think about all the beautiful images we never see featuring black people". Her desire to write an epic tale with roots in West Africa was matched by her desire to respond to police brutality. The spate of police violence against black Americans had a large impact on Adeyemi; she wanted to escape the helplessness and fear she felt: "What is the point if my life ends at the barrel of a police officer's gun?" In the author's note at the end of the novel, Adeyemi makes a call to emotion, telling the reader that "if [they] cried for Zulaikha ... cry for innocent children like Jordan Edwards, Tamir Rice, and Aiyana Stanley-Jones."

Adeyemi drew inspiration from Yoruba culture and Western fantasy fiction like Harry Potter and Avatar: The Last Airbender and from both West African mythology and the Black Lives Matter movement. She has also cited the books Shadowshaper and An Ember in the Ashes as primary inspirations. Finally, Adeyemi was also affected by the backlash against the black characters in the film The Hunger Games: she wanted to write a story so good even racists would want to read it.

Adeyemi worked as a creative writing coach while she wrote the novel. While her first draft had major sections of the story omitted, the second draft, which she was ultimately forced to complete in a month to enter it in a writing competition, was where she felt it needed to meet her expectations. For Adeyemi there was no option but for the book to be successful and perfect, given the pressures placed on black creators: "I'm not going to put Zélie's face on the cover of this book and give you anything less than an incredible story, because for the kids who have never seen themselves, they need to see that, and they need to know that they are beautiful and that they are powerful". She wrote the book while bingeing the television show The Good Wife in the background. She became so exhausted through the non-stop work of the writing that she became disoriented, even at one point thinking she was a lawyer. The entire editing process took eighteen months to complete, going through 45 drafts.

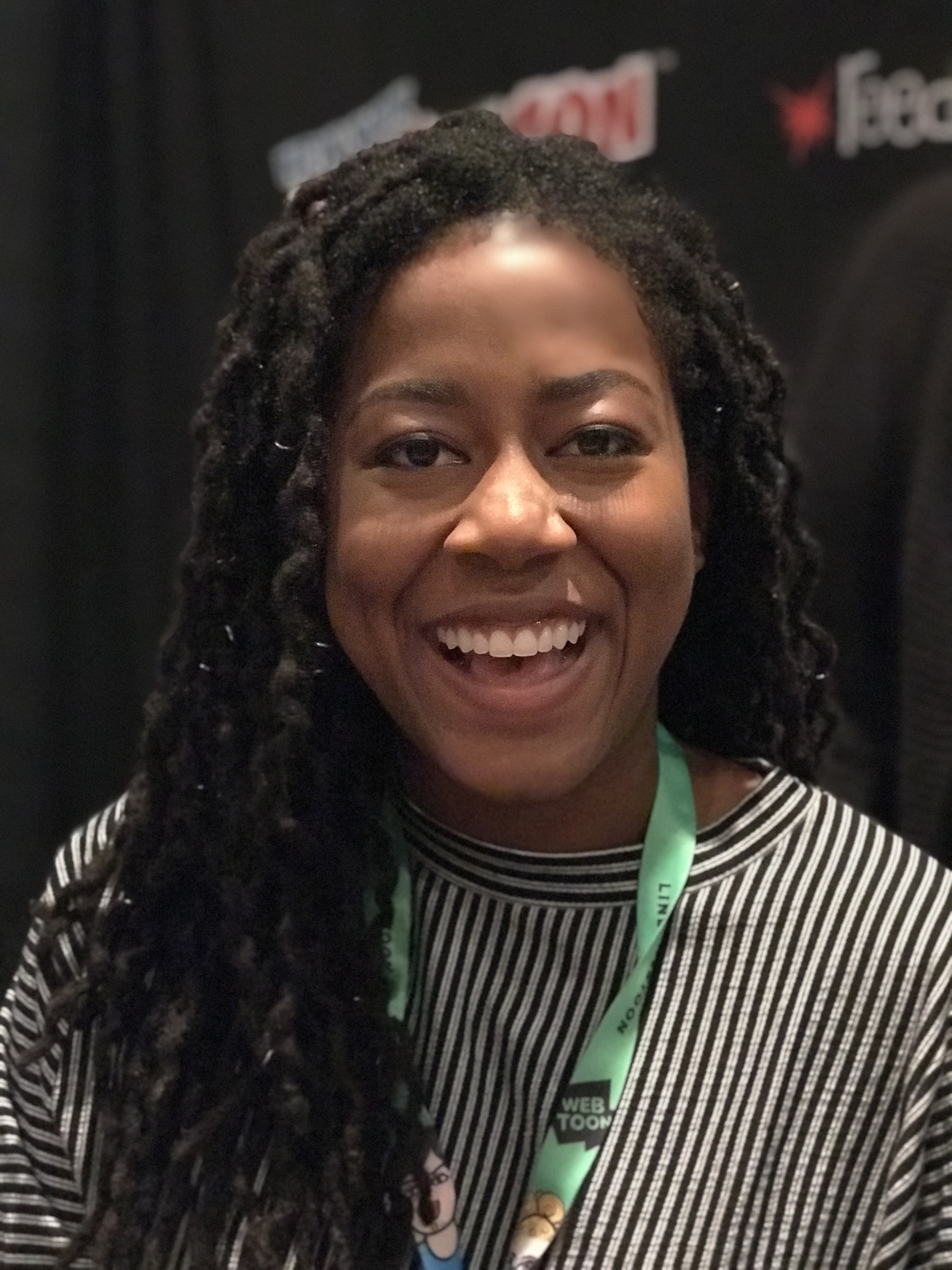
Author Tomi Adeyemi in 2017

As in J. K. Rowling' Harry Potter series, Adeyemi wanted to build a complete world, though she did not like when she was called the "black J.K. Rowling", preferring instead phrases like "the new J.K. Rowling". She worked hard to map the distances between cities and the time it would take a horse and lion to travel between them, as well as reasoning through the logical implications of her creative choices, such as having characters ride big cats. She also had to figure out parallels in her imagined world to issues like skin bleaching, which would not exist in a world without white people. She got help from her Nigerian mother at times for things like naming the spells that involved use of the Yoruba language.

== Publication history ==
Adeyemi entered Pitch Wars, a competition that matches emerging writers with mentor editors and authors to revise their work before submitting them to literary agents. She came to be represented by Alexandra Machinist and Hillary Jacobson of ICM Partners. In 2017, publishing rights to The Children of Blood and Bone sold as a trilogy to Tiffany Liao at Henry Holt Books for Young Readers, and rights to the film adaptation sold to Fox 2000 Pictures. Reportedly these deals came to seven figures, with Deadline describing it as "one of the biggest YA debut novel publishing deals ever." Adeyemi was 23 at the time.

Children of Blood and Bone was published on March 6, 2018, by Henry Holt Books for Young Readers after being called "the biggest fantasy debut novel of 2018" and one of the most anticipated books of the year. A sequel, Children of Virtue and Vengeance, was published in December 2019.

== Themes ==
The conflict between the kosidán and maji, with the kosidán possessing lighter skin and having enslaved segments of the maji, raises issues of race and class and how these can be used to divide a nation. Class ultimately becomes a stand-in for race in the book. The story does not shy from showing the way that power can be bound up with brutality. Saran feels that the only way to maintain control both personally as well as for his race is through oppression and enslavement of the minority. For Saran it is not enough to control the maji; he must also extinguish their hope and threaten genocide. Throughout the book, the maji respond to this oppression in different ways. Zélie, who has seen her mother killed, her father beaten, and her own freedom jeopardized at the hands of guards, or the police, offers one reaction with her determination to resist and overthrow the social order, offering a model for real life black activists. Inan, as both a maji and kosidán, has a different reaction, instead, wanting to see the two peoples united. The magic of the maji also serves as a connection between humanity and the gods.

The novel also tells a more intimate story as children struggle to win their parents' approval. Inan wants to fulfill his duty to his father and kingdom in order to be a good prince, but is also a maji himself and has a personal connection to other maji through Zélie. The complexity of teenagers who are eager to jump into the adult world and adult problems is also present in the novel as adolescents attempt to discover themselves. While they struggle with the weight of these obligations, the point-of-view characters in the book are able to demonstrate wisdom, courage and compassion beyond that of the adults they are seeking to please.

Ultimately, it's the female characters who survive trauma and show the way forward. While Zélie initially mistakes Amari as weak, it becomes clear Amari has learned other coping strategies while surviving under her abusive father. There is a great deal of loss in the book, with several characters important to the protagonists dying, but Zélie and Amari continue in their efforts.

== Reception ==
A starred review from Publishers Weekly lauded the novel for its complex characters and kaleidoscopic narrative. Kirkus Reviews, which gave the book a starred review and nominated it for the Kirkus Prize, called it, "Powerful, captivating, and raw." Charisse Jones of USA Today praised the novel, giving it four out of four stars: "While Tomi Adeyemi's Africa-inspired fantasy was written for young adults, readers of all ages will be captivated by this engrossing tale". David Canfield of Entertainment Weekly called the novel a "phenomenon" owing to the success of a first-time author. Author and poet Kiran Millwood Hargrave in The Guardian praised, "the hate-to-love romance [that] comes with high stakes, and the relationship is realistically and passionately realised. All of it is packaged in a tightly plotted, action-packed adventure." Less positively, The A.V. Club said the book failed to live up to its hype, criticising the way magic works in the novel and its length.

In 2018, the viewers of The Tonight Show Starring Jimmy Fallon selected Children of Blood and Bone as the first ever "Tonight Show Summer Read". Adeyemi later appeared as a guest on The Tonight Show on July 24, 2018, to discuss the book.

== Audiobook ==
An 18-hour audiobook narrated by Bahni Turpin was released in March 2018. The audiobook was well received. It won the 2019 Audie Award for best audiobook and was a runner-up for best Young Adult audiobook. "There's something magical about the timbre of Turpin's voice that's perfectly tuned to the fantastical nature of this novel. I felt transported into the world of Children of Blood and Bone," said Ron Charles, a judge for the award.> In a starred review, Hayley Schommer writing for Booklist complemented how the "pacing of the novel is further complemented by Turpin's own, appropriate adjustments in pace." Maggie Knapp in School Library Journal wrote of Turpin's ability to provide unique and distinguishable voices for both the main and supporting characters. Publishers Weekly's starred review also praised Turpin's work, "Turpin's bold reading of Adeyemi's Afro-futurist fantasy solidifies her reputation as one of the best voice actors working today." AudioFile magazine named it one of the best audiobooks of the year, praising Turpin's voices and her abilities to capture other elements of the novel, such as Yoruba incantations.

== Film adaptation ==
Prior to publication, Children of Blood and Bone was optioned for a film adaptation produced by Fox 2000 Pictures and Temple Hill Productions. Adeyemi had appreciated the work Fox 2000 and Temple Hill had done in producing Love, Simon and that they were the studios adapting The Hate U Give to film. In February 2019, Rick Famuyiwa was announced as the director. Adeyemi has said her dream cast would have Idris Elba in the role of Saran and Viola Davis playing Mama Agba.

However, after Disney acquired a majority of 21st Century Fox, which resulted in shuttering Fox 2000, the project was transferred to Lucasfilm, marking the studio's first original live-action project since its acquisition by Disney in 2012. Kay Oyegun (known for her work on the NBC comedy-drama series This Is Us) was also attached to write the script for the film. In September 2019, while talking to The Hollywood Reporter, Alan Horn revealed Kathleen Kennedy was in fact working with sister studio 20th Century Fox's chairman Emma Watts in developing the film. In December 2020, Kennedy announced that Lucasfilm would co-produce the film with 20th Century Studios.

By January 2022, Paramount Pictures had acquired the rights for a guaranteed exclusive theatrical release, with Temple Hill Entertainment producing alongside Sunswept Entertainment; Adeyemi will write the script and serve as executive producer. According to The Hollywood Reporter, Adeyemi had become dissatisfied with the pace of Lucasfilm's adaptation efforts and asked to serve as scriptwriter, a request that Lucasfilm had declined. Since Lucasfilm had wanted to focus on its own intellectual properties Star Wars, Indiana Jones, and Willow, it and 20th Century Studios had allowed the film rights to Children of Blood and Bone to lapse in late 2021. In December 2023, Gina Prince-Bythewood was announced as the director.

In November 2024, a casting call was sent out by Prince-Bythewood for male and female actors between the ages of 10 and mid-20s living in Nigeria. The film is currently set for release on January 15, 2027. In January 2025, Thuso Mbedu, Amandla Stenberg, Damson Idris, Tosin Cole, Cynthia Erivo, Chiwetel Ejiofor, Lashana Lynch, Idris Elba, and Viola Davis joined the cast.
