= Independent Spirit Award for Best Female Performance in a New Scripted Series =

Annual US film award

- Presented by: Film Independent
- First award: Shira Haas; Unorthodox (2020)
- Final award: Thuso Mbedu; The Underground Railroad (2021)
- Website: filmindependent.org

The Independent Spirit Award for Best Female Performance in a New Scripted Series was one of the annual Independent Spirit Awards to honor an actress who has delivered an outstanding performance in a new scripted series. It was first presented in 2020 with Shira Haas being the first recipient of the award for her role as Esther "Esty" Shapiro in miniseries Unorthodox and the last recipient of the award is Thuso Mbedu for her role as Cora Randall in The Underground Railroad.

In 2022, it was announced that the acting categories would be retired and replaced with two gender neutral categories: Best Lead Performance in a New Scripted Series & Best Supporting Performance in a New Scripted Series.

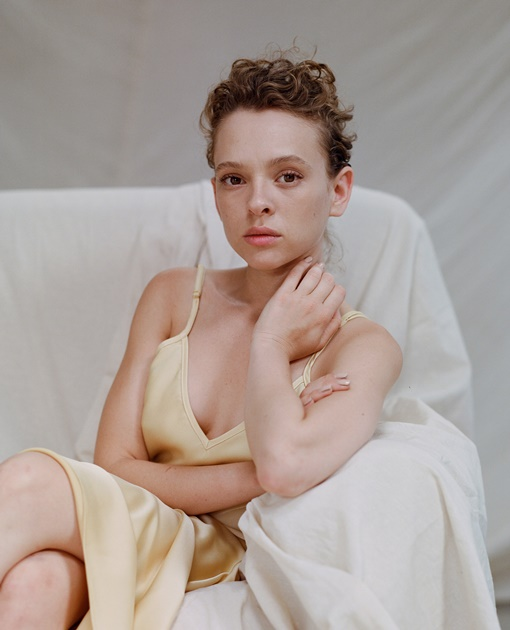
Shira Haas was the first recipient for Unorthodox.

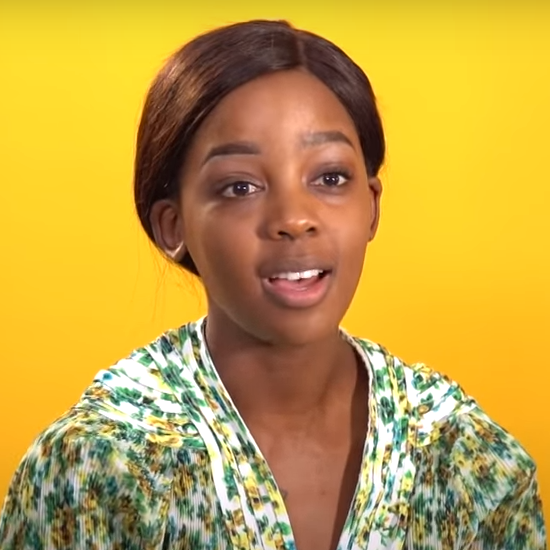
Thuso Mbedu was the final recipient for The Underground Railroad.

== Winners and nominees ==
=== 2020s ===
Year	Nominees	Show	Role	Network
2020	Shira Haas	Unorthodox	Esther "Esty" Shapiro	Netflix
2020	Elle Fanning	The Great	Catherine the Great	Hulu
2020	Abby McEnany	Work in Progress	Abby	Showtime
2020	Maitreyi Ramakrishnan	Never Have I Ever	Devi Vishwakumar	Netflix
2020	Jordan Kristine Seamón	We Are Who We Are	Caitlin Poythress / Harper	HBO
2021	Thuso Mbedu	The Underground Railroad	Cora Randall	Prime Video
2021	Deborah Ayorinde	Them: Covenant	Livia "Lucky" Emory	Prime Video
2021	Jasmine Cephas Jones	Blindspotting	Ashley Rose	Starz
2021	Jana Schmieding	Rutherford Falls	Reagan Wells	Peacock
2021	Anjana Vasan	We Are Lady Parts	Amina	Channel 4
