= Children of Virtue and Vengeance =

2019 young adult fantasy novel by Tomi Adeyemi

- Author: Tomi Adeyemi
- Language: English
- Series: Legacy of Orïsha
- Genre: young adult, romantic fantasy
- Publisher: Henry Holt and Co
- Publication date: December 3, 2019
- Publication place: Nigeria
- Media type: Print (hardcover and paperback), audiobook, e-book
- Pages: 448
- ISBN: 978-1-250-17099-6
- Preceded by: Children of Blood and Bone
- Followed by: Children of Anguish and Anarchy

Children of Virtue and Vengeance is a 2019 young adult fantasy romance novel by Nigerian-American novelist Tomi Adeyemi. It is the sequel to Children of Blood and Bone and the second book in the Legacy of the Orisha series. The novel follows Zélie as she tries to unite the maji, secure Amari's right to the throne and protect the maji from the new monarch's wrath.

== Plot ==
After Baba's death, Tzain and Zélie bury him at sea, with Zélie conducting the ritual to lead his spirit through to the afterlife. Tzain, Zélie, and Amari reach land, and as they are discussing their plans to gain the Queen's blessing and install Amari as ruler of Orïsha, Roën comes aboard. He offers some fish to Nailah, and gives them information on a new band of rebels calling themselves the Iyika, or the "revolution." Roën tells them that when magic came back to Orïsha, they stormed the capital, Lagos, taking hold of the city with their new abilities. Amari's mother, Queen Nehanda, is presumed to be dead, with no one having heard from her since the attack. After learning this, Amari decides to announce her rule, asking for Roën's help in taking control, but is interrupted by the still-alive Queen Nehanda. Nehanda, now an extremely powerful tîtán, a member of the nobility who recently gained magic, is searching for Amari, and calling for her death. Roën abandons them when he realizes they can’t afford to pay for his help, and though the group manages to escape, Zélie’s lionaire throws her against a tree and she is left unconscious.

Zélie wakes up in a dreamscape, where she sees Inan. Remembering his betrayal at the Holy Temple, she attacks him, starting to choke him with black vines. Inan wakes up in the palace, and is told about the current situation. Nehanda has taken control of Orïsha, with Inan’s cousin Ojore as her Admiral. Soon Inan prepares to take the throne, donning the robes of his father, King Saran. Ojore is openly uncomfortable with the fact that Inan is a tîtán, as his parents were killed by a group of Burner maji, but is willing to help Inan. He gives Inan the bronze coin he received from Zélie, saying that, while he doesn’t know why Inan would have had it with him at the temple, it must be important. Inan goes before the advisors, expressing his desire to create peace in Orïsha, and orders the monarchy to hand out rations to the people, who are starving after much of the city and roads were destroyed.

Meanwhile, Zélie wakes up from the dreamscape, immediately telling Amari that Inan is alive, and vowing to kill him. Tzain, Zélie, and Amari, unsure of what to do, decide to free the maji trapped in a nearby fort, but are stopped by Roën. He explains that the Iyika have hired him to fetch them, and he brings them to their camp. When they finally meet the Iyika, Zélie learns that Mama Agba is the founder of the group, and that they have built a sanctuary called Ile Ijosin. Mama Agba leads the group to the sanctuary, where they meet the elders of the Maji Clans. The elder of the Eranko Clan, a Tamer named Na’imah, has received a message from one of their spies in Lagos, Raifa, about Inan’s proposed rations, but Zélie angrily insists that Inan is a liar and will do nothing to help the people of Orïsha. Amari attempts to defend her brother, but is told off by Ramaya, the Èmí Clan elder, who says she is unwelcome.

Back in Lagos, Inan and Nehanda are riding through the city, overseeing the distribution of rations. Nehanda reveals to Inan that she has the ability to absorb the power of others, and that she is planning to annihilate what is left of the maji. They are confronted by Raifa and several Iyika. Acting on Zélie’s claims that Inan can not be trusted, they attempt to burn down the royal food stores, destroying what food is left in Lagos. In retaliation, Inan and Ojore leave the palace at night and search for the Iyika hideout. Along the way, they are ambushed by Burners, and Inan is forced to use his magic, but they find the rebel outpost and take the remaining maji prisoner.

Amari convinces Zélie to teach her how to use magic, but she struggles. Zélie explains to her that tîtán magic is not like the magic of born maji. It is much harder to control, and can result in overwhelming explosions of power. Zélie is later called to a ceremony with Mama Agba and the elders, where she ascends and becomes the elder of the Ikú Clan, with the former elder, Mâzeli, becoming her Second. Zélie receives an ìsípayá, a vision from the gods, that depicts multicolored ribbons of light twisting together. The Iyika learn of what happened in Lagos with Raifa’s outpost, and Ramaya blames Amari, threatening her. Amari challenges Ramaya for the position of Èmí Clan elder, and though she wins, she loses control of her magic and leaves Ramaya in a coma. In the days following the battle, Amari stays in her room, the Healers refuse to treat her injuries, and she feels ostracized by the rest of the maji. Zélie convinces her to attend the elders’ meetings, but she is ignored by the other elders, who agree that Inan can’t be trusted. The elders decide to send maji to retrieve any remaining scrolls with incantations from Chândomblé, but Dakarai, a Seer and Elder of the Aríran Clan, realizes that Inan and Nehanda know about their plans. They enter the temple through a secret tunnel, but are attacked by soldiers before they seal themselves in the scroll room. Zélie and Amari gather the scrolls, but when Zélie touches Amari, she sees a blue ribbon of light coming from her chest. This leads Zélie to realize that Amari, like Nehanda, is a cênter, meaning she can draw power from other maji of her clan. They escape Chândomblé, fighting their way past Inan and the rest of the soldiers, and as they leave Nehanda destroys the temple. Once back at Ile Ijosin, Mama Agba explains that what happened with Amari was a result of the moonstone, which allows maji to join their lifeforces, or create cênters, but at the price of a blood sacrifice. Mama Agba suggests that Amari killing her father, Saran, was the act of sacrifice that made both her and her mother cênters. Zélie asks if the moonstone can be used to join maji of different clans, but Mama Agba tells her it only leads to disaster; the last time it was attempted the combination of magic created majacite.

A few days later, Zélie sees Amari sneaking away from camp, and follows her, finding her with Inan. Amari had created a dreamscape in an attempt to talk with her brother, revealing the Iyika’s location. Inan had initially offered to come and make a treaty with the Iyika, but before they can discuss it royal soldiers, led by General Jokôye, a Winder cênter, attack them. Amari draws on Inan’s power to defeat the guards, and Zélie fights with the other Reapers from her clan. Facing defeat, Zélie and Mâzeli connect their magic through the moonstone, and they manage to drive the soldiers off. Mâzeli, however, is killed from the strain, and Zélie is near death when Mama Agba severs her connection to the stone. Afterwards, at a meeting of the elders, Roën reveals that Inan’s forces are splitting up, dividing themselves between Lagos and Ibadan. While Zélie suggests they use this opportunity to escape Orïsha, Amari insists they stay and fight, as both Inan and the capital city will be vulnerable.

While the Iyika send forces to Lagos, Zélie joins the elders in Ibadan. She, Roën, and the Omi Clan Elder Nâomi travel through underwater caves, but are stopped when bombs planted in the caves by the monarchy are set off. Roën is trapped and nearly drowns, but Zélie drags him to the surface and uses the moonstone to save him, binding their lifeforces together. In Ibadan, Nehanda reveals to Inan that she was responsible for the Raid, as she created the tension between the monarchy and the maji by having Burners attack the nobility. After hearing the bombs go off, Nehanda and Inan escape Ibadan. The other Iyika don’t realize this, and Amari along with Cancers Jahi and Imani send a wave of disease through the village, planning to sacrifice the people of Ibadan to kill Nehanda and Inan. When they realize that the monarchy has left, and learn that their army has captured the Iyika forces in Lagos, Amari is imprisoned. Zélie tries to save the dying villagers, discovering that they can use the moonstone to bind elders’ lifeforces and bring the villagers back to life. Zélie realizes that this is what she saw in her ìsípayá - she and the other elders can use the moonstone to combine the elders’ power and defeat the monarchy. Mama Agba sacrifices herself so they can perform the ceremony, and the remaining Iyika sail to Lagos.

In Lagos, Inan drugs his mother's drink, before going to speak before the nobility. As he speaks to them, explosions are heard outside; Zélie and the elders destroy the monarchy’s defenses and infiltrate the palace. As the elders free the captured Iyika from the dungeons, Zélie hunts down Inan. When she finds him, she begins to kill him, drawing the life from his body, but is stopped when she sees Roën racing down the hallway, a cloud of thick white gas following him. As the cloud hits them, they lose consciousness, and when Zélie eventually wakes up, she is chained in the cell of a ship at sea.

== Characters ==
- Zélie Adebola: The protagonist of the novel and a young woman who possesses the power to control spirits. She is determined to avenge the death of her mother and free her people from the tyranny of the King of Orïsha.
- Tzain Adebola: Zélie's older brother and a skilled warrior. He is protective of his sister and helps her on her quest for vengeance.
- Princess Amari: The King of Orïsha's daughter. She is torn between her loyalty to her father and her desire to help Zélie and her people.
- Prince Inan: Amari's older brother and a skilled swordsman. He is kind-hearted and compassionate, and he falls in love with Zélie.
- Roën: The rogue mercenary who becomes Zélie's ally. He is powerful and dangerous, but he also has a soft side.
- Queen Nehanda: The mother of Inan and Amari. A powerful royal who leads the monarchy.
- Ojore: A young officer who is Inan's cousin and confidant. He is brave and loyal, and he helps Zélie on her quest.
- Mama Agba: A wise old woman who is the village healer. She is kind and compassionate, and she offers Zélie advice and wisdom.
- Mâzeli: A young maji who is in love with Zélie. He is gentle and kind, and he is willing to sacrifice his life for her.
- General Jokôye: The King of Orïsha's general and a skilled warrior. He is ruthless and cruel, and he is determined to crush the maji rebellion.

== Development ==
Tomi Adeyemi stated that writing the novel was harder than writing its predecessor because of the determination to balance the book ideas and the pressure from fans and her publishers to reach the deadline set for publication.

Writing the book over four rough drafts which were 600 pages long, Adeyemi wrote it as organic as she wanted it and as quickly as the ideas came to her while still exploring West African mythology.

== Reception ==
The book reached the number 1 on the New York Best Seller for young adult hardcover books and received generally positive reception like its predecessor.

Children of Virtue and Vengeance was included among the Times top 100 fantasy novel of all time.
