= The Girl from St. Agnes =

- Written by: Gillian Breslin
- Directed by: Catharine Cooke; Cindy Lee
- Composer: Brendan Jury
- Country of origin: South Africa
- Original language: English
- No. of seasons: 1
- No. of episodes: 8

Production
- Executive producers: Niclas Ekdahl; Candice Fangueiro; Shaamila Fataar
- Producers: Harriet Gavshon; JP Potgieter; Nimrod Geva
- Production company: Quizzical Pictures

Original release
- Network: Showmax
- Release: 31 January – 21 March 2019

The Girl from St. Agnes is a South African mystery drama television limited series developed by a creative team of women from Quizzical Pictures. It premiered on 31 January 2019 as Showmax's first original drama series.

== Premise ==
The sudden death of a popular student at a prestigious all-girls boarding school in the Midlands of KwaZulu-Natal is quickly ruled a tragic accident. Her teacher, however, has reason to believe otherwise and sets off to find the truth.

== Cast ==
=== Main ===
- Nina Milner as Kate Ballard
- Tyrone Keogh as Shane Moolman
- Graham Hopkins as Chris Whittaker
- Jane de Wet as Alexis "Lexi" Summerveld
- Paige Bonnin as Megan Clayton
- Shamilla Miller as Jenna Galloway
- Makgotso M as Moipone Molopo
- Celeste Khumalo as Kholwa
- Tessa Jubber as Philippa Summerveld
- Tristan de Beer as Jason Clayton
- Karl Thaning as Dylan McMahon
- Zakeeya Patel as Sharon McMahon
- Jocelyn Broderick as Joanne Whittaker
- Robert Hobbs as Gary Clayton

=== Supporting ===
- Jerry Mofokeng as Mr. Gwala
- Charmaine Weir-Smith as Rachel Summerveld
- Richard Lukunku as Kgalala Molopo

== Episodes ==
No.	Title	Directed by	Written by	Original release date
1	"Before the Devil Fell"	Catharine Cooke	Unknown	31 January 2019
2	"An Everlasting Funeral"	Catharine Cooke	Sean Steinberg	7 February 2019
3	"My Own Sins"	Catharine Cooke	Zoë Laband	14 February 2019
4	"Immaculate Proof"	Cindy Lee	Zoë Laband	21 February 2019
5	"The Proper Morning"	Cindy Lee	Zoë Laband	28 February 2019
6	"The Devil's Agents"	Cindy Lee	Sean Steinberg	7 March 2019
7	"Loose Spirits"	Catharine Cooke	Unknown	14 March 2019
8	"Vengeance is Loose"	Catharine Cooke	Unknown	21 March 2019

== Production ==
=== Development ===
Gillian Breslin served as head writer, whilst Catharine Cooke and Cindy Lee co-directed the series. Producer Harriet Gavshon drew upon her own real-life experiences at boarding school for inspiration. Moonyeenn Lee was in charge of casting.

=== Filming ===
Principal photography took place on location in Ixopo and Johannesburg, wrapping in November 2018. Multiple locations were used to make up the fictional school, including King's Grant Country Retreat.

== Release ==
A teaser was released on 9 January 2019 followed by a full trailer on 15 January. The 8-episode drama launched on Showmax on 31 January. It was showcased at the 2019 MIPTV in Cannes.

== Reception ==
=== Awards and nominations ===
Year	Award	Category	Recipient(s)	Result	Ref.
2020	South African Film and Television Awards	Best Script – TV Drama	Gillian Breslin, Zoë Laband, Sean Steinberg	Nominated	
2020	South African Film and Television Awards	Best Original Music – TV Drama	Brendan Jury	Nominated	
2020	South African Film and Television Awards	Best Actor – TV Drama	Robert Hobbs	Nominated	
