= Makgotso M =

South African actress

- Born: 5 October 1991 (age 34); Katlehong, South Africa
- Other name: Makgotso Monyemorathoe
- Education: Brunel University London
- Occupation: Actress
- Years active: 2014–present

Makgotso Monyemorathoe (Note: She has confirmed that the correct spelling of her surname is Monyemorathoe. Anything else is a misspelling.) (born 5 October 1991) is a South African actress. Her television work includes the Mzansi Magic drama Is'Thunzi (2016–2017) and the Showmax miniseries The Girl from St. Agnes (2019). She appeared in the historical epic film The Woman King (2022).

== Early life ==
Monyemorathoe was born in Katlehong and spent her early childhood in Alberton, where she attended Alberview Primary School. She is Zulu on her mother's side and Pedi on her father's side. In 2003 at the age of eleven, she moved to England with her mother, a nurse, and sister. They first lived in Brighton, where she attended East Brighton College of Media and Art (COMART), and then Hitchin, where she attended The Priory School. During this time, she became a naturalised British citizen.

Upon moving to England, Monyemorathoe became interested in drama, participating in school productions and local clubs. She completed A Levels in Theatre Studies, Media, and Psychology before going on to study at Brunel University London. She also joined the National Youth Theatre. After graduating with a Bachelor of Arts in Theatre and Film Studies, she returned to South Africa in 2014.

== Career ==
Monyemorathoe made her television debut in 2014 with a guest appearance in the third season of My Perfect Family on SABC1 followed by her film debut in Ayanda directed by Sara Blecher and produced by Terry Pheto.

2016 saw Monyemorathoe's breakout as she joined the soap operas Isidingo as Kamogelo Tsotetsi and Muvhango as Onika. That October, she began starring in the Mzansi Magic teen drama Is'Thunzi, playing the role of Tishiwe for both of its seasons. Monyemorathoe had a main role as Moipone Molopo in the 2019 Showmax mystery miniseries The Girl from St. Agnes. She had a supporting role in the BET+ original A Royal Surprise from Zimbabwean filmmaker Beautie Masvaure Alt.

In early 2022, it was announced Monyemorathoe had been cast in the historical epic film The Woman King directed by Gina Prince-Bythewood and produced by Viola Davis.

== Filmography ==
=== Film ===
Year	Title	Role	Notes
2015	Ayanda		Drama / Romance
2022	The Woman King	Iniya	Action / Drama / History
2024	The Drop	Priscilla	Comedy

=== Television ===
Year	Title	Role	Notes
2014	My Perfect Family	Tumi	Season 3; guest role
2016	Sokhulu & Partners	Zara	Season 3; guest role
2016	Sober Companion	Tselane	Guest role
2016	Mutual Friends	Palesa	Season 2
2016	Isidingo	Kamogelo Tsotetsi	
2016	Muvhango	Onika	
2016–2017	Is'Thunzi	Thishiwe	Main role; 22 episodes
2017	Saints and Sinners	Nandi	Season 3
2019	The Girl from St. Agnes	Moipone Molopo	Miniseries; main role; 8 episodes
2019	Shuga	Dudu	2 episodes
2019	Agent	Delilah	13 episodes
2019	Chin Up!	Mandisa	Web; season 3
2020	Survive	New Girl	Episode: "Welcome to Life House"
2022	A Royal Surprise	Sonya	Television film
