= Is'Thunzi =

- Genre: Drama
- Created by: Amanda Lane
- Written by: Amanda Lane; Thishiwe Ziqubu
- Starring: Thuso Mbedu; Yolanda Kgaka; Makgotso Monyemorathoe; Zikhona Bali
- Country of origin: South Africa
- Original languages: isiZulu and English
- No. of seasons: 2
- No. of episodes: 26

Production
- Production locations: Johannesburg; KwaZulu-Natal
- Running time: 22 minutes
- Production company: Rapid Blue

Original release
- Network: Mzansi Magic
- Release: 10 October 2016 – 2 October 2017

Is'thunzi is a 2016 South African teen drama series centered around a group of four girls and their everyday struggles. Its lead actress, Thuso Mbedu, who portrays Winnie, was nominated for two consecutive International Emmy Awards in 2017 and 2018. In 2018 she won the South African Film and Television Awards (SAFTA) for Best Actress in a Television Drama. Is'thunzi was produced for Mzansi Magic by Rapid Blue.

== Cast ==
- Thuso Mbedu as Winnie Bhengu
- Yolanda Kakabadse as Noxolo
- Makgotso Monyemorathoe as Thishiwe
- Zikhona Bali as Londi
