= Lucius Baston =

American actor from Queens, NY

- Born: Lucius Baston Jr. Queens, NY, U.S.
- Occupation(s): Actor, producer
- Years active: 2005–present
- Children: 2
- Parents: Lucius Baston Sr. (father); Veronica Albury (mother)

Lucius Baston is an American actor from Queens, New York. He is known for best known for his roles in Atlanta, Lovecraft Country and The Underground Railroad.

== Early life ==
The younger of two boys, Baston started entertaining at the age of 11 years old as a disc jockey (DJ) for community and school events. Later on through multiple changes in profession, Baston sparked a new interest in an acting career by gazing upon head-shots from a fellow friend. Since 2005, he started the progression of his roles on screen.

== Career ==
After working as a DJ in his youth, Baston joined the United States Air Force for eleven years. He later proceeded to pursue a career in electronics, and then on the air as a radio broadcaster. After these endeavors, Baston went on to making a career in the acting industry. He started by going to the Performers Studio Workshop where he honed in on his skills.

== Filmography ==
=== Film ===
Year	Title	Role	Notes	Ref.
2005	The Touch	Car Parts Employee		
2007	Unspeakable	Ed Collins	Short	
2007	Father of Lies	Percy Mason	Video	
2007	Paso Doble	Hatuchama Man	Short	
2008	The Belly of the Beast	Beeizulbulb		
2009	Bad Lieutenant: Port of Call New Orleans	Deshawn 'Midget' Hackett		
2009	RoboDoc	Kevin		
2010	The Wronged Man	Shelton	TV movie	
2010	The More Perfect Yellow	Lucius Breckensted	Short	
2010	Adventure Scouts	Piranha		
2010	Brock Stetson	Franswa Saint Croy Jr.	Video	
2011	Teen Spirit	Vice-Principal Richardson	TV movie	
2011	Cassadaga	Officer Hall		
2012	Tooth Fairy 2	Ernie	Video	
2012	Jonathan Simon: The Exchange	Dr. Jonathan Simon	Short	
2012	Pharmboy	Mr. Keaton		
2014	Ride Along	Ballsdeep23		
2014	The Breaking Point	Tone		
2014	Frank vs. God	Guard		
2014	Jessabelle	Mr. Woods		
2015	Bad Ass 3: Bad Asses on the Bayou	H.S. Security Guard	Video	
2015	Beginner's Guide to Sex	Coach Bush		
2015	N.O.L.A Circus	Woody		
2016	Ride Along 2	Ballsdeep23		
2016	The Last Punch	Mr. Nottage		
2018	Daphne & Velma	Mr. Nussbaum	Video	
2018	Dirt Road to Lafayette	Wee Thin Guy		
2018	The Front Runner	DC Cab Driver		
2018	83 Days	Al Johnson	Short	
2019	Three's Complicated	Clinton Collins	TV movie	
2019	The Best of Enemies	Teacher		
2019	Keys to the City	Young Gizzle		
2020	By Night's End	Ben		
2022	Secret Headquarters	Jerry the Janitor		
2023	57 Seconds	Sammy		

=== Television ===
Year	Title	Role	Notes	Ref.
2011	House of Payne	Mr. Williams	Episode: "Payneful Resolution"	
2011	Treme	Auditioner	Episode: "On Your Way Down"	
2012	Common Law	Manager	Episode: "The Ex-Factor"	
2012	Homeland	Paris	Episode: "New Car Smell"	
2012	Revolution	Militia Wagon Soldier	Episode: "The Children's Crusade"	
2012-13	Suit Up	Cameron Ross	Guest: season 1, recurring cast: season 2	
2013	Magic City	Number Writer	Episode: "Sitting on Top of the World"	
2015	Graceland	Swiggy	Episode: "Hand of Glory"	
2015	Real Rob	Plumber	Episode: "VIP Treatment"	
2016	The Inspectors	Shawn Harper	Episode: "Jamaican Lottery"	
2016	Roots	Reverend Garland	Episode: "Part 4"	
2016	Stranger Things	Technician	Episode: "Chapter Eight: The Upside Down"	
2016	Atlanta	Chris	Episode: "The Club"	
2017	Queen Sugar	Local Farmer	Episode: "Copper Sun"	
2018	The Quad	Cyrus Hitchens	Episode: "#TheInterruptionofEverything"	
2018	Love Is_	Lionel Woods	Recurring cast	
2019	Insatiable	Warden Winters	Episode: "Pretty In Prison"	
2019	The Purge	Attendant	Episode: "Blindspots"	
2019-21	Bigger	Terry	Recurring cast: season 1, guest: season 2	
2020	Lovecraft Country	Phil Hodges	Recurring cast	
2021	The Underground Railroad	Prideful	Recurring cast	
2021	Loki	Male Shopper	Episode: "The Variant"	
2021	Queens	DJ Kool Red	Episode: "God's Plan"	
