= Tyrone Keogh =

South African actor and model

- Born: 1982 (age 43–44); Johannesburg, South Africa
- Other name: Ty Keogh
- Occupations: Director, Model, Assistant director
- Years active: 1989–present
- Height: 1.82 m (6 ft 0 in)
- Spouse: Shivaani Ghai (m. 2016)
- Children: 1
- Father: Danny Keogh

Tyrone Keogh (born 1982) is a South African actor, model and assistant director. He is best known for his roles in the series One Piece live action TV series, 24 Hours to Live, The Girl from St. Agnes and Dominion. He was named Best Dressed Man by GQ South Africa in 2012. He also, played a major role in the 2024 series Summertide based in South Africa.

== Early life ==
Keogh was born in 1982 in Johannesburg, South Africa. He is the son of actor Danny Keogh. His mother Debbie is also a film producer. In 2011, he won the 2011 Cleo Bachelor of the Year competition in Fourways, Johannesburg.

== Career ==
At 14, Keogh began his acting career with various related production jobs as a scenic set painter, set builder, propsman and animal wrangler. At 16, he appeared in South African TV commercials for many brands such as: Vodacom UK, Pepsi USA, Opel Europe, Orange Communications, Nestle, and KFC. Then he became an art director on commercials and music videos. From 2002 to 2004, he worked as the assistant set dresser for the films Pavement, Citizen Verdict and Wake of Death. Then in 2004, he received his first film role as "Young Michael Kittridge" in the film Blast. Since then, he received many supportive roles in many major international films such as Blood Diamond (with Leonardo DiCaprio), The Deal (with Meg Ryan), Goodbye Bafana (with Joseph Fiennes) and Starship Troopers Marauder (with Casper Van Dien). In 2007, he acted in the Hollywood film Goodbye Bafana directed by .

In 2008, he moved to London and signed with the agent Jeremy Conway. After that, he started to act in the short films: Service Pistol and The Tunnel. In the meantime, he also appeared in two BBC television shows. However he returned to South Africa in 2011. After relocating to Johannesburg, he got the opportunity to play the role "Jack van Reenen" in the M-Net soap opera The Wild. From 2011 to 2013, Keogh played the role as "Jack van Reenen" in the M-Net soap opera The Wild. In 2013, he acted in the serial SAF3 and played the role of "Tom". During this period, he was invited to act in some international television serials such as Dominion, Homeland and Black Sails. After the success of these serials, he acted in the Brian Smrz's film 24 Hours to Live along with Ethan Hawke.

In 2024, he was announced to play the role of Dalton in the 2nd season of Netflix produced live action adaptation of One Piece.. This became his most successful acting role in his career, with the show debuting globally at number 1 position of Netflix's most viewed series with 16.8 million views in its first release week.

== Personal life ==
From 2012 to 2014, Keogh dated former Miss South Africa Nicole Flint. He married British actress Shivaani Ghai in November 2016.

== Filmography ==
=== Film ===
Year	Title	Role	Genre	Ref.
2003	Citizen Verdict	assistant set dresser	Feature	
2004	Wake of Death	assistant set dresser	Feature	
2004	Blast	Young Michael Kittridge	Feature	
2006	Blood Diamond	SA Page	Feature	
2007	Goodbye Bafana	Brent Gregory	Feature	
2007	More Than Just a Game	Warder Ekwilbou	Feature	
2008	The Deal	Bagel PA	Feature	
2008	Starship Troopers 3: Marauder	MP Sergeant	Direct-to-video	
2008	Service Pistol	Jp	Short film	
2010	The Tunnel	South African Corporal, First assistant director	Short film	
2010	Death Race 2	Cameraman	Direct-to-video	
2011	Waterfront	Actor	Feature	
2015	Eye in the Sky	Sammy	Feature	
2017	24 Hours to Live	Keith Zera	Feature	
2017	Accident	Fred	Feature	
2020	Transference: A Love Story	Douglas Cornell	Feature	
2020	Jerusalema - South African Film Industry	Jack	Short film	

=== Television ===
Year	Title	Role	Genre	Ref.
2002	Pavement	assistant set dresser	Television film	
2008	Generation Kill	Charlie Marine	Miniseries	
2011	The Wild	Jack van reenen	Series	
2013	SAF3	Tom	Series	
2014	Dominion	Lt. Vince Halloran	Series	
2014	Homeland	S.F. #1	Series	
2017	Black Sails	Adams	Series	
2019	The Girl from St. Agnes	Shane Moolman	Series	
2020	Still Breathing	Stephen	Series	
2024	Summertide	Gavin Field	1 Series	
2026	One Piece	Dalton	Series; Season 2	
