= Children of Anguish and Anarchy =

2024 young adult fantasy novel by Tomi Adeyemi

- Author: Tomi Adeyemi
- Language: English
- Series: Legacy of Orïsha
- Genre: young adult, romantic fantasy
- Publisher: Henry Holt and Co
- Publication date: June 25, 2024
- Publication place: Nigeria
- Media type: Print (hardcover and paperback), audiobook, e-book
- Pages: 448
- ISBN: 978-1-250-17101-6
- Preceded by: Children of Virtue and Vengeance

Children of Anguish and Anarchy is a 2024 young adult fantasy romance novel by Nigerian-American novelist Tomi Adeyemi. It is the sequel to Children of Virtue and Vengeance and the last book in the Legacy of Orïsha trilogy. The novel follows Zélie as she faces King Baldyr, the leader of the Skulls, who seeks to harvest her power and use it to conquer Orïsha. The book topped the New York Times Bestsellers list.

== Background ==
Adeyemi began writing the novel in 2020. The novel introduces new worlds outside of Orïsha: the flora based civilization of New Gaīa and a vast country occupied by the tribes of Baldeírik. Adeyemi stated that the novel's depiction of slavery closely mirrors the Atlantic slave trade.

== Plot ==
Following the catastrophic magical explosion in Lagos, the internal civil war between the maji and the Orïshan royal family is abruptly halted by a sudden foreign invasion. Zélie Adebola, Princess Amari, Prince Inan, and Tzain are captured and locked in iron cages aboard a massive warship. They are trafficked across the seas by the Skulls, a ruthless mercenary army wearing iron skulls and wielding magic-damping bloodmetal. Zélie learns that their captor is King Baldyr, the tyrannical ruler of the Baldeírik tribes, who has spent years pillaging civilizations to track her down. Baldyr targets Zélie because she possesses the rare "blood of the sun," and he affixes a magical medallion to her chest that fuses into her bones, intending to manipulate her immense magical strength to fuel his own global conquests.

Stripped of their freedom and facing a common enemy, the four main characters put aside past betrayals to survive. While imprisoned, Tzain successfully orchestrates a daring slave rebellion aboard the fleet. Following their escape, the group temporarily splits up. Amari, Tzain, and Zélie follow Zélie's visions of a girl with diamond eyes to the shores of New Gaīa, a flora-based society outside of Orïsha. There, they meet Mae'e, a powerful hierophant, and attempt to secure an alliance with the New Gaīan emperor against Baldyr. Meanwhile, Inan and the remaining freed maji sail back to Orïsha to prepare the homeland's defenses for the impending invasion, with Inan actively seeking redemption for his past actions.

As a cosmic event known as the Blood Moon Prophecy approaches, King Baldyr launches a full-scale invasion on Orïsha's shores. The combined forces of Orïsha and their new allies make a desperate final stand against the Skulls' advanced anti-magic weaponry. During the chaotic battle, Prince Inan sacrifices his life to save Zélie and rally the retreating rebel forces. Devastated by Inan's death, Zélie directly confronts King Baldyr under the glowing Blood Moon. She taps into the raw element of ancestral magic, overwhelming the medallion's constraints and successfully destroying Baldyr and breaking his army. In the aftermath of the war, the shared trauma of the invasion permanently ends the cycle of oppression between the kosidân and the maji. Queen Amari and Zélie commit to rebuilding Orïsha together as equals, finally bringing peace to the continent.

== Reception ==
The book received positive receptions from book reviewers and readers alike and was among the most anticipated books of 2024. The book was a Publishers Weekly bestseller. Adeyemi appeared as a guest on ABC News to speak on the book. A review from Locus praised the novel, stating "Children of Anguish and Anarchy is fast-paced, relentless in its action scenes and offers a compelling and decisive conclusion to a series that has made its author renowned and multi-award winning." A mixed review from Kirkus Reviews called the book "a thrilling, climactic storm with an abrupt conclusion."
