= The Underground Railroad (miniseries) =

2021 American television miniseries

- Promotional poster
- Genre: Historical drama; Magical realism; Fantasy
- Created by: Barry Jenkins
- Based on: The Underground Railroad by Colson Whitehead
- Directed by: Barry Jenkins
- Starring: Thuso Mbedu; Chase W. Dillon; Joel Edgerton; Fred Hechinger; Peter Mullan; Mychal-Bella Bowman; Sheila Atim
- Composer: Nicholas Britell
- Country of origin: United States
- Original language: English
- No. of episodes: 10

Production
- Executive producers: Barry Jenkins; Adele Romanski; Brad Pitt; Dede Gardner; Jeremy Kleiner
- Cinematography: James Laxton
- Running time: 20–78 minutes
- Production companies: Plan B Entertainment; Pastel Productions; Big Indie Pictures; Amazon Studios

Original release
- Network: Amazon Prime Video
- Release: May 14, 2021

The Underground Railroad is an American historical magical realism drama television miniseries created and directed by Barry Jenkins based on the 2016 novel of the same name by Colson Whitehead. The series premiered on Amazon Prime Video on May 14, 2021.

The series won the Golden Globe Award for Best Limited or Anthology Series or Television Film, the BAFTA for Best International Programme, received a Peabody Award, and garnered several other nominations including the Primetime Emmy Award for Outstanding Limited or Anthology Series.

== Premise ==
A fictional story of people attempting an escape from slavery in the southern United States in the 1800s utilizing a key plot element that employs the literary style of magical realism. In reality, "The Underground Railroad" was a network of abolitionists, hidden routes, and safe houses that helped enslaved African-Americans escape to freedom in the early to mid-1800s. In the novel and the series, it is an actual railroad complete with engineers, conductors, tracks, and tunnels. Cora, an enslaved woman from Georgia, joins newcomer Caesar to ride the subterranean train to freedom.

== Cast ==
=== Main ===
- Thuso Mbedu as Cora Randall
- Chase W. Dillon as Homer, Ridgeway's assistant
- Joel Edgerton as Arnold Ridgeway, a slave catcher
  - Fred Hechinger as young Arnold (Note: Only credited as starring in episode 4)
- Peter Mullan as Ridgeway Senior, father of Arnold Ridgeway
- Mychal-Bella Bowman as Fanny Briggs/Grace (Note: Only credited as starring in episode 7)
- Sheila Atim as Mabel (Note: Only credited as starring in episode 10)

=== Recurring ===
- Aaron Pierre as Caesar Garner
- William Jackson Harper as Royal
- Lily Rabe as Ethel Wells
- Chukwudi Iwuji as Mingo
- Calvin Leon Smith as Jasper
- Damon Herriman as Martin Wells
- Amber Gray as Gloria Valentine
- Benjamin Walker as Terrance Randall
- Justice Leak as James Randall
- Lucius Baston as Prideful
- Owen Harn as Chandler
- Bri Collins as Olivia
- Ryan James as Red
- Will Poulter as Sam
- Peter de Jersey as John Valentine
- IronE Singleton as Mack
- Marcus "MJ" Gladney Jr. as Ellis
- Cullen Moss as Judge Smith
- Jim Klock as Tom Hardman

== Episodes ==
No.	Title	Directed by	Teleplay by	Original release date
1	"Chapter 1: Georgia"	Barry Jenkins	Barry Jenkins	May 14, 2021
After a captured runaway slave is publicly burned to death by his master Terrance Randall, two young plantation slaves named Cora Randall and Caesar Garner flee from slaveholding Georgia into freedom. The couple sets its hopes on the mysterious Underground Railroad. That organization consists of an unknown number of steam trains and a vast system of tunnels to transport runaways unseen to the non-slaveholding states of the US and finally to Canada. On their run, Cora strikes a young man in the head, who was with a group of slave catchers. From then on, she is not only a wanted runaway but a fugitive from justice for murder. Hence, Cora and Caesar are stubbornly pursued by slave catcher Arnold Ridgeway and his underage but early-grown-up aide, a black boy named Homer. Ridgeway boasts that no runaway has ever escaped him with the exception of Cora's mother Mabel, who had disappeared without a trace some ten years earlier.
2	"Chapter 2: South Carolina"	Barry Jenkins	Jacqueline Hoyt and Nathan C. Parker	May 14, 2021
Taken by an underground train to Griffin, a (fictional) city in South Carolina, Cora and Caesar are treated well in the beginning. Cora receives school lessons in reading and in etiquette while Caesar is offered a job as an assistant to a white scholar. But after a while they discover the reality behind the friendly behavior. The town's citizens benefit the negroes only in order to engage in controlling the black community through coerced sterilization and forced drug use. Ridgeway eventually finds out about Griffin, and he and Homer go there searching for Cora and Caesar. Cora is discovered by Homer, but she gets away and escapes to the Underground Railroad. Meanwhile, Caesar is cornered by Ridgeway.
3	"Chapter 3: North Carolina"	Barry Jenkins	Allison Davis	May 14, 2021
Cora's next destination is an unnamed village in the midst of the woods. The town's people have formed a human potential cult that eagerly eliminates any sort of ethnic or intellectual variance. Thus any written material or image viewed as iniquitous is burnt, every black person is killed regardless of whether they are slave, runaway or freedman, and any person of Irish descent is seen as inferior. Cora hides in the attic of Martin Wells, the local Underground Railroad station agent, sharing the room with adolescent Grace, another black runaway. When Ridgeway finds out, he saves Cora from lynching by arresting her, and his associate murders Martin for protecting the railroad from Ridgeway. A furious mob drags Martin's wife Ethel away to unjustly execute her by hanging or immolation. The Wells' house is set on fire with Grace still inside.
4	"Chapter 4: The Great Spirit"	Barry Jenkins	Adrienne Rush	May 14, 2021
Born in Tennessee, Ridgeway and his father runs a farm and a forge. A forceful man of integrity, Ridgeway Sr., a pantheist, is guided by his belief in a "Great Spirit." Ridgeway Sr. employs only paid freedmen and detests slavery. Arnold is an unconfident young man who shows no talent for his father's work as a blacksmith. Arnold is driven by his envy of his father's self-confident black workers. Thus, he persuades Mack, the black son of one of the freedmen employed by his father, to jump into a dead well, which causes a permanent limp. For the first time, Arnold makes his own money by supporting a group of slave catchers hunting down a runaway black man. Arnold later disappoints his father by expressing his personal view that slaves who have freed themselves are people of worth while those who remain slaves are empty of any humanity. Unable to reconcile with his father, Arnold leaves home.
5	"Chapter 5: Tennessee – Exodus"	Barry Jenkins	Nathan C. Parker	May 14, 2021
On their way back to Georgia, Ridgeway, Homer, Boseman (a slave catcher), Cora and her fellow sufferer Jasper cross former Cherokee land. The natives have already been forcibly removed on the Trail of Tears, and the surrounding lands and woods the group now travels through are a burnt-out wasteland useless to all. Ridgeway tells Cora that Lovey, a girl she escaped with, was hung from a gallows and did not die for two days. Cora later attempts to escape after Boseman loosened her chains in order to rape her but she is caught. That night, Ridgeway brutally murders Boseman for the latter's incessant complaining, his treatment of Cora, and for reminding Ridgeway of his estranged relationship with his father. At a favorable moment, Ridgeway reveals how he met Homer: he purchased him when Homer was a little child but set him free the very next day. Since then Homer has not left Ridgeway's side. Cora attempts to escape again while Ridgeway is shooting at some game. Jasper sets himself free by dying in the wagon as the final result of his starving himself to death. Cora almost drowns herself in a river during an escape attempt but is rescued and recaptured by Ridgeway.
6	"Chapter 6: Tennessee – Proverbs"	Barry Jenkins	Nathan C. Parker and Barry Jenkins	May 14, 2021
Ridgeway takes Cora to his father's home so he can pay his last respects to the dying old man. Nevertheless there is no reconciliation between father and son. A drunken Ridgeway tells Cora that Caesar was ripped apart by an outraged crowd after the white townsfolk learned he and Cora allegedly killed a white youth during their flight ("Chapter 1: Georgia"). When Ridgeway falls asleep, three armed freedmen under their leader Royal free Cora and take her to the next Underground Railroad station. Ridgeway is left behind, chained to his bed frame and guarded by a grown-up limping Mack ("Chapter 4: The Great Spirit"). Homer sneaks in, kills Mack, and frees his surrogate father.
7	"Chapter 7: Fanny Briggs"	Barry Jenkins	Jihan Crowther	May 14, 2021
In North Carolina, the burning Wells house sets the neighborhood on fire and the resulting turmoil facilitates Grace's escape through the back door. Ethel Wells is hung on a tree by her wrists, left to die slowly and painfully. Grace makes it to the half-destroyed Underground Railroad station. Climbing over a boulder heap, the young girl spots a waiting train. Though Grace was the name given to her by Mr. Wells, she reveals her true identity to the female train manager: Fanny Briggs.
8	"Chapter 8: Indiana Autumn"	Barry Jenkins	Jacqueline Hoyt	May 14, 2021
Cora follows Royal to the Valentine Farm, an independent black community and winery in Indiana, which prospers under the guidance of the Afro-American founding couple, Gloria and John Valentine. As free people of color, the settlers are even allowed to bear firearms. Royal explains to Cora that she is now safe since slave catchers are not allowed to set foot on any person's property without a warrant from the local judge, whom the community bribes in order to be warned before that document is issued so the hunted person or persons can escape. However, since Cora is not only a simple runaway but a fugitive murderer, her status is precarious. Influential black community member Mingo wants her expelled. Royal spends time with Cora hoping to help her let go of her past and see that she is part of something greater. Cora rejects his efforts and later finds he has left on a mission for the community with two other men.
9	"Chapter 9: Indiana Winter"	Barry Jenkins	Barry Jenkins	May 14, 2021
Royal returns with a group of men and women, and Cora opens up about her feelings about his leaving. She decides to tell her story to the community, including her attack of a young man during her flight. Mingo, a community member and a self-freed former slave, interrupts her tale to express his concerns about having her stay since Cora poses a danger to them as a wanted criminal. Ridgeway, after burning Mack's body, goes on to hunt Cora and appears in the local town. He demands a warrant from Judge Smith to search the village for Cora but the judge refuses Ridgeway until the latter can produce a deed proving Cora is runaway property. Royal and Cora spend personal time together. In town, businessman Tom Hardman, Judge Smith, Mingo, and another businessman play cards while discussing a deal for a percentage of the community's fine wine. Cora tells Royal of her concern that the community will force her to leave. Ridgeway is frustrated having to wait for the deed and stops Judge Smith and Hardman on the street to make another demand to search the community. The judge rejects it. Hardman later visits Ridgeway offering his assistance. On the day when it will be decided if Cora can stay or not, the townsmen Mingo invited arrive during the debate and Ridgeway, with Homer, illegally enters the village along with a group of gunmen. Homer mystically knows exactly which cabin is Cora's. Hardman's men then proceed to massacre most of the people living on the winery. In the end, Royal is killed and a grief-stricken Cora is caught again by Ridgeway. Ridgeway forces Cora to take him to an Underground Railroad station, but as they climb down the entrance's rope ladder she pulls Ridgeway off and they fall to the ground. Cora shoots a seriously injured Ridgeway, leaving Homer to grieve over his body. She and young Molly escape through the local Underground Railroad tunnel.
10	"Chapter 10: Mabel"	Barry Jenkins	Barry Jenkins and Jacqueline Hoyt	May 14, 2021
A flashback discloses the mystery of the disappearance of Cora's mother, Mabel. When a mentally unstable fellow slave kills her own two foster children and then herself, Mabel flees into a swamp. She comes to her senses and realizes that little Cora has been left behind. Mabel intends to return, but is bitten by a snake and dies, without anyone seeing it. Some ten years later, Cora and Molly climb out of the Underground Railroad tunnel and a prairie schooner later approaches, driven by a stranger. They board, heading west for an unknown future.

== Production ==
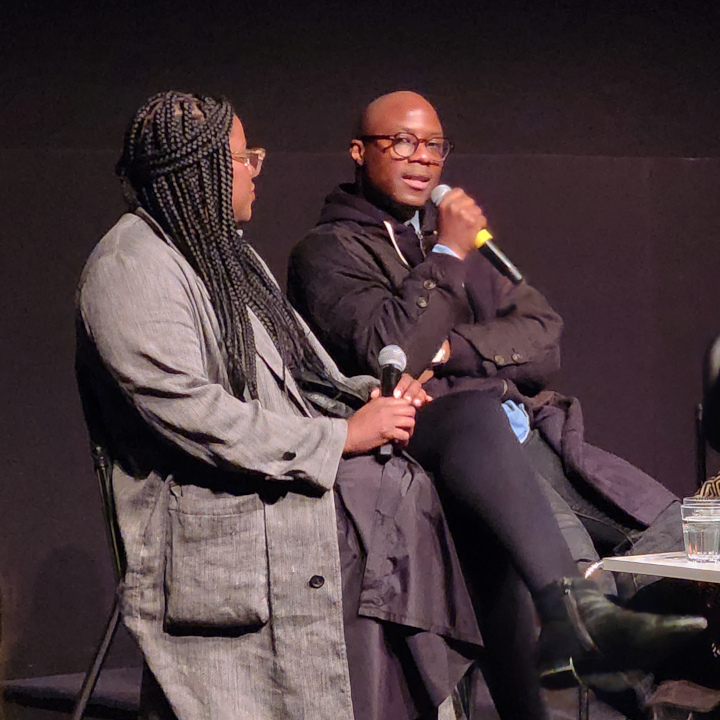
Editor Joi McMillon and director Barry Jenkins in 2024

=== Development ===
On September 16, 2016, it was announced that Barry Jenkins was set to adapt Colson Whitehead's novel The Underground Railroad into a limited series. Jenkins was expected to produce the series alongside Adele Romanski. Production companies involved with the series were set to include Plan B Entertainment. On March 27, 2017, it was reported that Amazon Video had given the production a script-to-series commitment. On June 5, 2018, it was announced that Amazon given the production a formal greenlight and that Jenkins would direct all eleven episodes of the series. In June 2019, Nicholas Britell announced he would serve as composer on the series.

=== Casting ===
In April 2019, Thuso Mbedu, Chase W. Dillon, Aaron Pierre and Joel Edgerton joined the cast of the series. In August 2019, Damon Herriman and William Jackson Harper joined the cast of the series in recurring roles. In September 2019, Lucius Baston joined the cast of the series in a recurring role. In October 2019, Amber Gray joined the cast of the series in a recurring role. In November 2019, Jim Klock joined the cast of the series in a recurring role. In January 2020, Lily Rabe joined the cast of the series in a recurring role. In February 2020, Fred Hechinger and the rest of the cast was announced.

=== Filming ===
Filming began in August 2019 in Savannah, Georgia, and production lasted 116 days before concluding on September 22, 2020.

== Release ==
The Underground Railroad was released on Amazon Prime Video on May 14, 2021. The Underground Railroad received a home media release through The Criterion Collection on June 25, 2024.

== Reception ==
=== Critical response ===
The Underground Railroad received widespread critical acclaim. Review aggregator Rotten Tomatoes reported an approval rating of 95% based on 110 critic reviews, with an average rating of 8.9/10. The website's critics consensus reads, "With a superb ensemble and Barry Jenkins' singular eye, The Underground Railroad delicately translates its source material into a powerfully humane series that is as challenging as it is necessary." Metacritic gave the series a weighted average score of 92 out of 100 based on 37 critic reviews, indicating "universal acclaim".

Reviewing the series for Rolling Stone, Alan Sepinwall gave a rating of 4/5 and described the series as "an imperfect take on a painful, sprawling subject. But its emotional highs and lows are stronger than anything you are likely to find on TV this year, just as those images are more gorgeous and nightmarish." Stephen Robinson of The A.V. Club gave the series an A and said, "Jenkins has assembled an amazing cast, including William Jackson Harper as Cora's love interest, Royal, and Lily Rabe, who chills the screen as Ethel, the wife of a North Carolina abolitionist (Damon Herriman)."

=== Accolades ===
Year	Award	Category	Nominee(s)	Result	Ref.
2021	Black Reel Awards	Outstanding TV Movie or Limited Series	Barry Jenkins	Nominated	
2021	Black Reel Awards	Outstanding Directing, TV Movie/Limited Series	Barry Jenkins	Nominated	
2021	Black Reel Awards	Outstanding Writing, TV Movie/Limited Series	Barry Jenkins	Nominated	
2021	Black Reel Awards	Outstanding Actress, TV Movie/Limited Series	Thuso Mbedu	Nominated	
2021	Black Reel Awards	Outstanding Supporting Actor, TV Movie/Limited Series	William Jackson Harper	Nominated	
2021	Gotham Awards	Breakthrough Series – Long Format	The Underground Railroad	Nominated	
2021	Gotham Awards	Outstanding Performance in a New Series	Thuso Mbedu	Won	
2021	Hollywood Critics Association TV Awards	Best Streaming Limited Series, Anthology Series, or Live-Action Television Movie	The Underground Railroad	Nominated	
2021	Hollywood Critics Association TV Awards	Best Actor in a Limited Series, Anthology Series, or Television Movie	Joel Edgerton	Nominated	
2021	Hollywood Critics Association TV Awards	Best Actress in a Limited Series, Anthology Series, or Television Movie	Thuso Mbedu	Nominated	
2021	Hollywood Critics Association TV Awards	Best Supporting Actor in a Limited Series, Anthology Series, or Television Movie	William Jackson Harper	Nominated	
2021	Primetime Emmy Awards	Outstanding Limited or Anthology Series	Barry Jenkins, Adele Romanski, Mark Ceryak, Brad Pitt, Dede Gardner, Jeremy Kleiner, Colson Whitehead, Richard Heus, Jacqueline Hoyt, and Richleigh Heagh	Nominated	
2021	Primetime Emmy Awards	Outstanding Directing for a Limited or Anthology Series or Movie	Barry Jenkins	Nominated	
2021	Primetime Creative Arts Emmy Awards	Outstanding Casting for a Limited or Anthology Series or Movie	Francine Maisler and Meagan Lewis	Nominated	
2021	Primetime Creative Arts Emmy Awards	Outstanding Cinematography for a Limited or Anthology Series or Movie	James Laxton (for "Chapter 9: Indiana Winter")	Nominated	
2021	Primetime Creative Arts Emmy Awards	Outstanding Music Composition for a Limited or Anthology Series, Movie, or Special (Original Dramatic Score)	Nicholas Britell (for "Chapter 2: South Carolina")	Nominated	
2021	Primetime Creative Arts Emmy Awards	Outstanding Sound Editing for a Limited or Anthology Series, Movie, or Special	Onnalee Blank, Chris Kahwaty, Katy Wood, Bryan Parker, Jay Jennings, Harry Cohen, Luke Gibleon, Pietu Korhonen, John Finklea, and Heikki Kossi (for "Chapter 9: Indiana Winter")	Nominated	
2021	Primetime Creative Arts Emmy Awards	Outstanding Sound Mixing for a Limited or Anthology Series or Movie	Onnalee Blank, Mathew Waters, Joe White, and Kari Vähäkuopus (for "Chapter 1: Georgia")	Nominated	
2021	Television Critics Association Awards	Program of the Year	The Underground Railroad	Nominated	
2021	Television Critics Association Awards	Outstanding Achievement in Movies, Miniseries and Specials	The Underground Railroad	Nominated	
2021	Television Critics Association Awards	Individual Achievement in Drama	Thuso Mbedu	Nominated	
2022	American Society of Cinematographers Awards	Outstanding Achievement in Cinematography in Motion Picture, Limited Series, or Pilot Made for Television	James Laxton (for "Chapter 9: Indiana Winter")	Won	
2022	Art Directors Guild Awards	Excellence in Production Design for a Television Movie or Limited Series	Mark Friedberg	Nominated	
2022	British Academy Television Awards	Best International Programme	The Underground Railroad	Won	
2022	Cinema Audio Society Awards	Outstanding Achievement in Sound Mixing for Television Movie or Limited Series	Joseph White Jr., Onnalee Blank, Mathew Waters, Geoff Foster, and Kari Vahakuopus (for "Chapter 10: Mabel")	Nominated	
2022	Costume Designers Guild Awards	Excellence in Period Television	Caroline Eselin-Schaefer (for "Chapter 8: Indiana Autumn")	Nominated	
2022	Critics' Choice Television Awards	Best Limited Series	The Underground Railroad	Nominated	
2022	Critics' Choice Television Awards	Best Actress in a Movie/Miniseries	Thuso Mbedu	Nominated	
2022	Critics' Choice Television Awards	Best Supporting Actor in a Movie/Miniseries	William Jackson Harper	Nominated	
2022	Directors Guild of America Awards	Outstanding Directorial Achievement in Miniseries or TV Film	Barry Jenkins	Won	
2022	Golden Globe Awards	Best Miniseries or Television Film	The Underground Railroad	Won	
2022	Golden Reel Awards	Outstanding Achievement in Sound Editing – Limited Series or Anthology	Onnalee Blank, Jay Jennings, Harry Cohen, Luke Gibleon, Chris Kahwaty, Katy Wood, Bryan Parker, Pietu Korhonen, Lars Halvorsen, Heikki Kossi, and John Finklea (for "Chapter 9: Indiana Winter")	Won	
2022	Independent Spirit Awards	Best New Scripted Series	The Underground Railroad	Nominated	
2022	Independent Spirit Awards	Best Female Performance in a New Scripted Series	Thuso Mbedu	Won	
2022	NAACP Image Awards	Outstanding Television Movie, Mini-Series or Dramatic Special	The Underground Railroad	Nominated	
2022	NAACP Image Awards	Outstanding Directing in a Drama Series	Barry Jenkins (for "Chapter 9: Indiana Winter")	Won	
2022	NAACP Image Awards	Outstanding Supporting Actor in a Television Movie, Limited-Series or Dramatic Special	William Jackson Harper	Nominated	
2022	NAACP Image Awards	Outstanding Supporting Actress in a Television Movie, Limited-Series or Dramatic Special	Sheila Atim	Nominated	
2022	Peabody Awards	Entertainment	The Underground Railroad	Won	
2022	Producers Guild of America Awards	Outstanding Producer of Limited or Anthology Television Series	The Underground Railroad	Nominated	
2022	Writers Guild of America Awards	Adapted Long Form	Jihan Crowther, Allison Davis, Jacqueline Hoyt, Barry Jenkins, Nathan C. Parker, and Adrienne Rush	Nominated	

== See also ==
- Underground (TV series)
- List of films featuring slavery
