= Thuso Mbedu =

South African American actress (born 1991)

- Mbedu in 2026
- Born: Thuso Nokwanda Mbedu; 8 July 1991 (age 35); Pietermaritzburg, KwaZulu-Natal, South Africa
- Education: University of the Witwatersrand
- Occupation: Actress
- Years active: 2014–present
- Notable work: Children of Blood and Bone; The Woman King; The Underground Railroad; Task

Thuso Nokwanda Mbedu (born 8 July 1991) is a South African actress. She rose to prominence for her performance in the South African teen drama series Is'Thunzi for which she was nominated consecutively for an International Emmy in 2017 and 2018. Mbedu later appeared on the 2018 Forbes Africa 30 under 30 list.

In 2021, she starred in the Amazon Video limited series The Underground Railroad as Cora, which made her the first South African actress to lead an American television series, and earned her the Independent Spirit Award for Best Female Performance in a New Scripted Series. She then made her feature film debut in the American historical epic The Woman King (2022) in the role of Nawi.

== Early life and education ==
Mbedu was born at Midlands Medical Centre in Pietermaritzburg, KwaZulu-Natal to a Zulu mother and a father of Sotho and Xhosa descent. She was raised in the Pelham area by her grandmother, who became her legal guardian after the deaths of both her parents at an early age.

Mbedu attended Pelham Primary School and then Pietermaritzburg Girls' High School. She went on to study Physical Theatre and Performing Arts Management at the University of the Witwatersrand (Wits), graduating in 2013 with honours, after also having taken a course at the Stella Adler Studio of Acting in New York City in 2012.

== Career ==
In late 2014, Mbedu had a small role in the second season of the Mzansi Magic soapie Isibaya, before landing her role as journalism student and wild child Kitso on Scandal!. She then had a guest role as Kheti on the second season of the SABC 2 teen drama series Snake Park, and a lead role as Boni Khumalo in the television series Saints and Sinners.

After being unemployed for six months, Mbedu landed her first starring role in television in the Mzansi Magic teen drama series Is'Thunzi, which premiered in October 2016. In the series, she played Winnie, a sassy go-getter who dreams of marrying a rich and famous rugby player only to have her dreams dashed when she is exiled to go live with her strict aunt in Bergville. While filming a rape scene for the show, she suffered a panic attack. In September 2017, she was nominated for an International Emmy Award in the category Best Performance by an Actress for her role as Winnie in Is'Thunzi and was the only African to be nominated that year.

Mbedu made her international debut as Cora in the 2021 Amazon Video historical limited series The Underground Railroad, based on the novel of the same name by Colson Whitehead and directed and executive produced by Academy Award winner Barry Jenkins. Mbedu earned a Hollywood Critics Association Award, an Independent Spirit Award, and a Gotham Award for the series.

In April 2021, it was announced Mbedu would make her film debut as Nawi opposite Viola Davis in The Woman King, a historical epic film inspired by the true events that took place in the Kingdom of Dahomey, one of the most powerful states of Africa in the 18th and 19th centuries. The film was directed by Gina Prince-Bythewood, from a script by Fatherhood co-writer Dana Stevens.

In 2023, Mbedu became the ambassador and spokesperson of L’Oréal for Sub-Saharan Africa. In August 2023, Mbedu narrated 'The not-quite-redemption of South Africa's infamous ultra-marathon cheats' on Curio, an audio platform. In January 2025 Deadline reported that Mbedu has been cast in the lead role in the upcoming Paramount film Children of Blood and Bone as Zélie amongst Viola Davis, Cynthia Erivo, Damson Idris, Amandla Stenberg, Idris Elba and Tosin Cole.

== Filmography ==
Key
†	Denotes productions that have not yet been released

=== Film ===
Year	Title	Role	Notes	Ref.
2022	The Woman King	Nawi		
2024	Mufasa: The Lion King	Junia (voice)		
2027	Children of Blood and Bone †	Zélie	Post-production	

=== Television ===
Year	Title	Role	Notes	Ref.
2014	Isibaya	Nosisa	3 episodes	
2014–2018	Saints and Sinners	Boni Khumalo	Lead role	
2015	Snake Park	Khethi	Guest role	
2015–2017	Scandal!	Kitso Medupe	Supporting role (15 episodes)	
2016–2017	Is'Thunzi	Winnie Bhengu	Lead role (25 episodes)	
2017–2019	Shuga	Ipeleng	Recurring role (20 episodes)	
2018	Liberty	Rosie	Miniseries (3 episodes)	
2018	Generations: The Legacy	Okuhle Cele	Recurring role	
2018	Side Dish	Phiwe	Miniseries	
2021	The Underground Railroad	Cora Randall	Miniseries (8 episodes)	
2023–present	Castlevania: Nocturne	Annette (voice)	Animated series (16 episodes)	
2025	Task	Aleah Clinton	Main role	

== Awards and nominations ==
Year	Association	Category	Nominated works	Result	Ref.
2017	DSTV Viewers Choice Awards	Best Actress	Is'Thunzi	Won	
2017	International Emmy Awards	Best Performance by an Actress	Is'Thunzi	Nominated	
2018	South African Film and Television Awards	Best Actress TV Drama	Is'Thunzi	Won	
2018	International Emmy Awards	Best Performance by an Actress	Is'Thunzi	Nominated	
2019	South African Film and Television Awards	Best Actress – TV Drama	Is'Thunzi	Nominated	
2020	1st KZN Entertainment Awards	Best Actress	Is'Thunzi	Nominated	
2021	TCA Awards	Individual Achievement in Drama	The Underground Railroad	Nominated	
2021	Black Reel Awards	Outstanding Actress, TV Movie/Limited Series	The Underground Railroad	Nominated	
2021	Hollywood Critics Association TV Awards	Best Actress in a Limited Series, Anthology Series, or Television Movie	The Underground Railroad	Nominated	
2021	Hollywood Critics Association TV Awards	TV Breakout Star	The Underground Railroad	Won	
2021	Gotham Awards	Outstanding Performance in New Series	The Underground Railroad	Won	
2022	Critics' Choice Television Awards	Best Actress in a Miniseries or Television Movie	The Underground Railroad	Nominated	
2022	Independent Spirit Awards	Best Female Performance in a New Scripted Series	The Underground Railroad	Won	
2023	Black Reel Awards	Black Reel Award for Best Breakthrough Performance by Female	The Woman King	Won	
2023	Black Reel Awards	Black Reel Award for Outstanding Supporting Actress	The Woman King	Nominated	
2023	National Film & Television: South Africa	Outstanding Actress of the Year	The Woman King	Nominated	
2023	National Film & Television: South Africa	Best Supporting Actress	The Woman King	Nominated	
2023	NAACP Image Awards	NAACP image Award for Outstanding Ensemble Cast	The Woman King	Nominated	
2023	Alliance of Women Film Journalists	Best Women Breakthrough Performance In Motion Picture	The Woman King	Nominated	
2026	Africa Choice Awards	Female Movie Star	Herself	Pending	

== See also ==
- List of South Africans based in America
- Winners of The Independent Spirited Awards
