= List of Western films of the 1990s =

A list of Western films released in the 1990s.

Title	Director	Cast	Country	Subgenre/notes
1990
Back to the Future Part III	Robert Zemeckis	Michael J. Fox, Christopher Lloyd, Mary Steenburgen, Thomas F. Wilson, Lea Thompson, James Tolkan, Elisabeth Shue, Flea, Burton Gilliam, Donovan Scott, Hugh Gillin	United States	Science fiction/comedy Western
Bad Jim	Clyde Ware	James Brolin, Richard Roundtree, John Clark Gable, Harry Carey Jr., Rory Calhoun, Ty Hardin, Pepe Serna, Bruce Kirby, Joe George, Suzanne Wouk, Pierrette Grace, Humberto Ortiz, Tonya Townsend, Teresa Vander Woude, William J. Ware, Scotty Wright, Barry Donovan	United States	B Western
Border Shootout	Chris McIntyre	Glenn Ford, Michael Ansara, Michael Forest, Cody Glenn, Russell Todd, Charlene Tilton, Michael Horse	United States	Traditional Western
Dances with Wolves	Kevin Costner	Kevin Costner, Mary McDonnell, Graham Greene, Rodney A. Grant, Floyd Red Crow Westerman, Tantoo Cardinal, Jimmy Herman, Nathan Lee Chasing His Horse, Michael Spears, Charles Rocket, Robert Pastorelli, Larry Joshua, Tony Pierce, Kirk Baltz, Tom Everett, Maury Chaykin, Wes Studi, Wayne Grace	United States	Revisionist Western
El Diablo	Peter Markle	Anthony Edwards, Louis Gossett Jr., Joe Pantoliano, John Glover, Robert Beltran, M.C. Gainey, Miguel Sandoval, Sarah Trigger, Branscombe Richmond, Jim Beaver, Don Collier	United States	Comedy Western
Grim Prairie Tales	Wayne Coe	James Earl Jones, Brad Dourif	United States	Horror Western
Gunsmoke: The Last Apache	Charles Correll	James Arness, Richard Kiley, Michael Learned, Amy Stock-Poynton, Geoffrey Lewis, Hugh O'Brian, Joe Lara, Peter Murnik, Ned Bellamy, Joaquín Martínez	United States	Made for television Western (sequel to the TV series Gunsmoke)
Montana	William A. Graham	Gena Rowlands, Richard Crenna, Lea Thompson, Justin Deas, Elizabeth Berridge, Darren Dalton, Scott Coffey, Michael Madsen, Dean Norris, Frank Salsedo	United States	B Western
Quigley Down Under	Simon Wincer	Tom Selleck, Laura San Giacomo, Alan Rickman, Chris Haywood, Ron Haddrick, Tony Bonner, Jerome Ehlers, Conor McDermottroe, Roger Ward, Ben Mendelsohn, Steve Dodd, Karen Davitt, Kylie Foster, Jonathan Sweet	Australia; United States	Outback Western
The Rose and the Jackal	Jack Gold	Christopher Reeve, Madolyn Smith, Granville Van Dusen, Carrie Snodgress, Kevin McCarthy	United States	Civil War Western
La sombra del tunco	Alfredo B. Crevenna	Miguel Ángel Rodríguez, Jorge Rivero	Mexico	
The Trace Leads to the Silver Lake	Günter Rätz	Gert Grasse (voice), Henry Hübchen (voice)	East Germany	Animated Euro-Western
Young Guns II	Geoff Murphy	Emilio Estevez, Kiefer Sutherland, Lou Diamond Phillips, Christian Slater, William Petersen, Alan Ruck, R.D. Call, James Coburn, Balthazar Getty, Jenny Wright, Jack Kehoe, Robert Knepper, Tom Kurlander, Viggo Mortensen, Tracey Walter, Brad Whitford, Scott Wilson, Leon Rippy, Howie Young, Alina Arenal, Jerry Gardner, Jon Bon Jovi	United States	Outlaw Western
1991
An American Tail: Fievel Goes West	Phil Nibbelink, Simon Wells	James Stewart (voice), Phillip Glasser (voice), Dom DeLuise (voice), John Cleese (voice)	United States	Animated Western
Black Robe	Bruce Beresford	Aden Young, Lothaire Bluteau, Sandrine Holt	Canada	Canadian Western
Blood River	Mel Damski	Wilford Brimley, Ricky Schroder, Adrienne Barbeau, Mills Watson, John Ryan, Henry Beckman, Dwight C. Mcfee, Don S. Davis, Jay Brazeau	United States	B Western
Brotherhood of the Gun	Vern Gillum	Brian Bloom, Jamie Rose	United States	B Western
City Slickers	Ron Underwood	Billy Crystal, Daniel Stern, Bruno Kirby, Patricia Wettig, Helen Slater, Jack Palance, Noble Willingham, Tracey Walter, Josh Mostel, David Paymer, Bill Henderson, Phil Lewis, Kyle Secor, Dean Hallo, Karla Tamburrelli, Yeardley Smith, Walker Brandt, Molly McClure, Lindsay Crystal, Jake Gyllenhaal	United States	Contemporary/comedy Western
Clearcut	Ryszard Bugajski	Graham Greene, John Boylan	Canada	
Conagher	Reynaldo Villalobos	Sam Elliott, Katharine Ross, Barry Corbin, Gavan O'Herlihy, Billy "Green" Bush, Ken Curtis, Paul Koslo, Daniel Quinn, Pepe Serna, Buck Taylor, Dub Taylor, Cody Braun, Anndi McAfee, James Gammon	United States	Traditional Western
The Gambler Returns: The Luck of the Draw	Dick Lowry	Kenny Rogers, Rick Rossovich, Reba McEntire, Claude Akins, Gene Barry, Bruce Boxleitner, Paul Brinegar, David Carradine, Chuck Connors, Johnny Crawford, James Drury, Linda Evans, Brian Keith, Jack Kelly, Doug McClure, Hugh O'Brian, Mickey Rooney, Dub Taylor, Clint Walker	United States	Made for television traditional Western
Into the Badlands	Sam Pillsbury	Bruce Dern, Mariel Hemingway, Helen Hunt, Dylan McDermott, Lisa Pelikan, Andrew Robinson, Michael J. Metzger	United States	Horror Western
The Legend of Kootenai Brown	Allan Kroeker	Tom Burlinson, Donnelly Rhodes, Michelle Thrush, Raymond Burr	Canada	
Lucky Luke	Terence Hill	Terence Hill, Nancy Morgan, Roger Miller	Italy; United States	Comedy Western based on Lucky Luke comics
Mi querido Tom Mix	Carlos García Agraz	Ana Ofelia Murguía, Eduardo Palomo	Mexico	
My Heroes Have Always Been Cowboys	Stuart Rosenberg	Scott Glenn, Kate Capshaw, Ben Johnson, Gary Busey, Balthazar Getty, Tess Harper, Mickey Rooney, Clarence Williams III, Dub Taylor, Clu Gulager, James Terry McIlvain	United States	Contemporary Western
Son of the Morning Star	Mike Robe	Gary Cole, Dean Stockwell, Rosanna Arquette, Rodney A. Grant, Nick Ramus, Stanley Anderson, Edward Blatchford, George Dickerson, Tom O'Brien, Terry O'Quinn, Nick Ramus, Floyd Red Crow Westerman	United States	Cavalry Western
Thousand Pieces of Gold	Nancy Kelly	Rosalind Chao, Chris Cooper, Michael Paul Chan, Dennis Dun, Jimmie F. Skaggs, Will Oldham, David Hayward, Beth Broderick, Kim Chen	United States	Revisionist Western
1992
Far and Away	Ron Howard	Tom Cruise, Nicole Kidman, Thomas Gibson, Robert Prosky, Barbara Babcock, Cyril Cusack, Eileen Pollock, Colm Meaney, Douglas Gillison, Michelle Johnson, Clint Howard, Rance Howard, Niall Tóibín, James Jude Courtney, Wayne Grace	United States	Epic Western
La fichera mas rapida del oeste	Víctor Manuel Castro	Rafael Inclán	Mexico	Comedy Western
Four Eyes and Six Guns	Piers Haggard	Judge Reinhold, Patricia Clarkson, Fred Ward, Dan Hedaya, M. Emmet Walsh, Dennis Burkley, John Schuck, Jonathan Gries, Austin Pendleton, Sandy Gibbons	United States	Comedy Western
Gunsmoke: To the Last Man	Jerry Jameson	James Arness, Pat Hingle, Amy Stock-Poynton, Matt Mulhern, Jason Lively, Joseph Bottoms, Morgan Woodward, James Booth, Amanda Wyss, Jim Beaver, Don Collier	United States	Made for television Western (sequel to the TV series Gunsmoke)
Keep the Change	Andy Tennant	William Petersen, Rachel Ticotin, Lolita Davidovich, Buck Henry, Jeff Kober, Fred Dalton Thompson, Lois Smith, Jack Palance, Frank Collison	United States	Contemporary Western
The Last of the Mohicans	Michael Mann	Daniel Day-Lewis, Madeleine Stowe, Russell Means, Eric Schweig, Jodhi May, Steven Waddington, Wes Studi, Maurice Roëves, Patrice Chéreau, Dylan Baker, Edward Blatchford, Tracey Ellis, Terry Kinney, Sebastian Roché, Justin M. Rice, Dennis Banks, Pete Postlethwaite, Colm Meaney, Mac Andrews, Benton Jennings, Jared Harris	United States	Historical Western
Mad at the Moon	Martin Donovan	Mary Stuart Masterson, Hart Bochner, Fionnula Flanagan	United States	Horror Western
El Mariachi	Robert Rodriguez	Carlos Gallardo, Consuelo Gómez, Peter Marquardt	Mexico; United States	Contemporary Western
Of Mice and Men	Gary Sinise	John Malkovich, Gary Sinise	United States	Contemporary Western
Pure Country	Christopher Cain	George Strait, Lesley Ann Warren, Isabel Glasser, Kyle Chandler, John Doe, Rory Calhoun, Molly McClure, James Terry McIlvain, Toby Metcalf, Mark Walters, Tom Christopher, Jeffrey R. Fontana, Jeff Prettyman, Ace in the Hole Band, Sharon Thomas, Julie Johnson	United States	Contemporary Western
The Running Gun	Lindsay Shonteff	James E. Coates	United States	B Western
Testigo silencioso	Luis Quintanilla Rico	Carlos Cardán	Mexico	
Thunderheart	Michael Apted	Val Kilmer, Sam Shepard, Graham Greene, Fred Ward, Fred Thompson, Sheila Tousey, Ted Thin Elk, John Trudell, Julius Drum, Sarah Brave, Allan R.J. Joseph, Sylvan Pumpkin Seed, Patrick Massett, Rex Linn, Brian A. O'Meara	United States	Contemporary Western
Unforgiven	Clint Eastwood	Clint Eastwood, Gene Hackman, Morgan Freeman, Richard Harris, Jaimz Woolvett, Saul Rubinek, Frances Fisher, Anna Thomson, David Mucci, Rob Campbell, Anthony James, Tara Dawn Frederick, Beverley Elliott, Liisa Repo-Martell, Josie Smith, Shane Meier, Ron White, Jeremy Ratchford, John Pyper-Ferguson, Jefferson Mappin, Frank C. Turner, Lochlyn Munro, Philip Hayes	United States	Revisionist Western
1993
The Ballad of Little Jo	Maggie Greenwald	Suzy Amis, Ian McKellen, Bo Hopkins, David Chung, Heather Graham, René Auberjonois, Carrie Snodgress, Melissa Leo, Sam Robards	United States	Revisionist Western
Bonanza: The Return	Jerry Jameson	Ben Johnson, Michael Landon Jr., Emily Warfield, Alistair MacDougall, Brian Leckner, Richard Roundtree, Jack Elam, Dirk Blocker, David Sage, Stewart Moss, Dean Stockwell, Linda Gray, John Ingle, Archie Lang, Richard Fullerton, Charles Gunning	United States	Made for television Western (sequel to the TV series Bonanza)
Cannibal! The Musical	Trey Parker	Trey Parker, Matt Stone, Jason McHugh	United States	Musical horror-comedy Western
Even Cowgirls Get the Blues	Gus Van Sant	Uma Thurman, Lorraine Bracco, Pat Morita, Angie Dickinson, Keanu Reeves, John Hurt, Rain Phoenix	United States	Contemporary/comedy Western
Geronimo	Roger Young	Joseph Runningfox, Nick Ramus, Michael Greyeyes, Tailinh Forest Flower, Jimmy Herman, August Schellenberg, Michelle St. John, Eddie Spears, Cody Lightning, *Ray Geerm Annie Olson	United States	Made for television biographical Western
Geronimo: An American Legend	Walter Hill	Jason Patric, Robert Duvall, Gene Hackman, Matt Damon, Wes Studi, Pato Hoffmann, Rodney A. Grant, Kevin Tighe, Steve Reevis, Carlos Palomino, Victor Aaron, Stuart Proud Eagle Grant, Scott Wilson, Stephen McHattie, John Finn, Lee de Broux, Rino Thunder, Jim Beaver, Lonnie Rodriguez	United States	Revisionist Western
Gunfight at Red Dog Corral	Christopher Coppola	Christina Fulton	United States	B Western
Gunsmoke: The Long Ride	Jerry Jameson	James Arness, James Brolin, Ali MacGraw, Amy Stock-Poynton, Christopher Bradley, Marco Sanchez, Tim Choate, Patrick Dollaghan, Don McManus, Michael Greene, Stewart Moss, Jim Beaver, John David Garfield	United States	Made for television Western (sequel to the TV series Gunsmoke)
Jonathan degli orsi	Enzo G. Castellari	Franco Nero, John Saxon, Floyd Red Crow Westerman	Italy	Spaghetti Western
The Last Outlaw	Geoff Murphy	Mickey Rourke, Dermot Mulroney, Ted Levine, Daniel Quinn, Gavan O'Herlihy, Keith David, John C. McGinley, Steve Buscemi, John David Garfield	United States	Outlaw Western
Paper Hearts	Rod McCall	James Brolin, Sally Kirkland, Pamela Gidley, Laura Johnson, Kris Kristofferson	United States	Western drama
Posse	Mario Van Peebles	Mario Van Peebles, Stephen Baldwin, Billy Zane, Tone Lōc, Melvin Van Peebles, Tiny Lister, Big Daddy Kane, Reginald VelJohnson, Blair Underwood, Isaac Hayes, Charles Lane, Robert Hooks, Richard Jordan, Pam Grier, Nipsey Russell, Woody Strode, Aaron Neville, Reginald Hudlin, Warrington Hudlin, Richard Gant, Richard Edson, Stephen J. Cannell, Vesta	United States	Revisionist Western
Return to Lonesome Dove	Mike Robe	Jon Voight, Barbara Hershey, Ricky Schroder, Louis Gossett Jr., William Petersen, Oliver Reed, Dennis Haysbert, Reese Witherspoon, Tim Scott, Chris Cooper, Nia Peeples, William Sanderson, CCH Pounder	United States	Traditional Western
Río Diablo	Rod Hardy	Kenny Rogers, Travis Tritt, Naomi Judd, Stacy Keach	United States	
Samurai Cowboy	Michael Keusch	Hiromi Go, Catherine Mary Stewart, Robert Conrad	Canada	Contemporary Western
Sommersby	Jon Amiel	Richard Gere, Jodie Foster, Brett Kelley, Bill Pullman, James Earl Jones, Lanny Flaherty, William Windom, Wendell Wellman, Clarice Taylor, Frankie Faison, Ronald Lee Ermey, Richard Hamilton, Maury Chaykin, Ray McKinnon	United States	North & South
Texas - Doc Snyder hält die Welt in Atem	Ralf Huettner, Helge Schneider	Helge Schneider	Germany	Comedy Euro-Western
Tombstone	George P. Cosmatos	Kurt Russell, Val Kilmer, Bill Paxton, Sam Elliott, Michael Biehn, Powers Boothe, Stephen Lang, Charlton Heston, Dana Delany, Jason Priestley, Robert John Burke, Billy Zane, Jon Tenney, Thomas Haden Church, Paula Malcomson, Lisa Collins, Dana Wheeler-Nicholson, Joanna Pacuła, Michael Rooker, Harry Carey Jr., Billy Bob Thornton, Tomas Arana, John Corbett, Buck Taylor, Peter Sherayko, Terry O'Quinn, Sandy Gibbons	United States	Outlaw Western
Uninvited	Michael Derek Bohusz	Jack Elam	United States	Horror Western
1994
8 Seconds	John G. Avildsen	Luke Perry, Stephen Baldwin, Red Mitchell, Cynthia Geary, James Rebhorn, Carrie Snodgress, Linden Ashby, Ronnie Claire Edwards, Renée Zellweger, George Michael, Brooks & Dunn, McBride & the Ride, Vince Gill, Karla Bonoff	United States	Contemporary Western
Bad Girls	Jonathan Kaplan	Madeleine Stowe, Mary Stuart Masterson, Andie MacDowell, Drew Barrymore, James Russo, James LeGros, Robert Loggia, Dermot Mulroney, Jim Beaver, Nick Chinlund, Harry Northup, Don Hood, Rodger Boyce, Cooper Huckabee, Beulah Quo	United States	
Blind Justice	Richard Spence	Armand Assante, Elisabeth Shue, Robert Davi, Adam Baldwin, Ian McElhinney, Danny Nucci, Jason Rodriguez, M. C. Gainey, Titus Welliver, Michael O'Neill, Clayton Landey, Jimmy Herman, Jack Black, Michael A. Goorjian, Tom Hodges	United States	B Western
Cheyenne Warrior	Mark Griffiths	Kelly Preston, Pato Hoffmann, Bo Hopkins, Dan Haggerty	United States	
The Cisco Kid	Luis Valdez	Jimmy Smits, Cheech Marin, Sadie Frost, Bruce Payne, Ron Perlman, Tony Amendola, Tim Thomerson, Pedro Armendariz, Phil Esparza, Clayton Landey, Charles McCaughan, Tony Pandolfo, Roger Cudney	United States	
City Slickers II: The Legend of Curly's Gold	Paul Weiland	Billy Crystal, Daniel Stern, Jon Lovitz, Jack Palance, Patricia Wettig, Noble Willingham, Pruitt Taylor Vince, Bill McKinney, David Paymer, Josh Mostel, Beth Grant, Lindsay Crystal	United States	Contemporary/comedy Western
The Cowboy Way	Gregg Champion	Woody Harrelson, Kiefer Sutherland, Dylan McDermott, Ernie Hudson, Cara Buono, Marg Helgenberger, Tomas Milian, Luis Guzmán, Allison Janney, Angel Caban, Matthew Cowles, Joaquín Martínez, Kristin Baer, Christian Aubert, Emmanuel Xuereb, Francie Swift, Christopher Durang, Laura Ekstrand, Graciela Lecube, José Zúñiga, Travis Tritt, John David Garfield	United States	Contemporary/comedy Western
Dead Man's Revenge	Alan J. Levi	Bruce Dern, Michael Ironside, Doug McClure, Randy Travis, Daphne Ashbrook	United States	B Western
F.T.W.	Michael Karbelnikoff	Mickey Rourke, Lori Singer, Aaron Neville, Peter Berg, John Enos III	United States	Contemporary Western
Frank & Jesse	Robert Boris	Rob Lowe, Bill Paxton, Randy Travis, Dana Wheeler-Nicholson, Maria Pitillo, Luke Askew, Alexis Arquette, Todd Field, John Pyper-Ferguson, Nicholas Sadler, William Atherton	United States	Outlaw Western
Gambler V: Playing for Keeps	Jack Bender	Kenny Rogers, Scott Paulin, Brett Cullen	United States	Traditional Western
Gunsmoke: One Man's Justice	Jerry Jameson	James Arness, Bruce Boxleitner, Amy Stock-Poynton, Alan Scarfe, Christopher Bradley, Mikey LeBeau, Kelly Morgan, Apesanahkwat, Hallie Foote, Don Collier, Sandy Gibbons	United States	Made for television Western (sequel to the TV series Gunsmoke)
Legends of the Fall	Edward Zwick	Brad Pitt, Anthony Hopkins, Aidan Quinn, Julia Ormond, Henry Thomas, Karina Lombard, Gordon Tootoosis, Christina Pickles, Paul Desmond, Tantoo Cardinal, Robert Wisden, John Novak, Kenneth Welsh, Bart the Bear	United States	Traditional Western
Lightning Jack	Simon Wincer	Paul Hogan, Cuba Gooding Jr., Beverly D'Angelo, Kamala Lopez, Pat Hingle, L.Q. Jones, Richard Riehle, Frank McRae, Roger Daltrey, Max Cullen, Sandy Gibbons	United States; Australia	Comedy Western
Maverick	Richard Donner	Mel Gibson, Jodie Foster, James Garner, Graham Greene, Alfred Molina, James Coburn, Geoffrey Lewis, Danny Glover, Dan Hedaya, Margot Kidder, Paul L. Smith, Hal Ketchum, Corey Feldman, Dub Taylor, Leo Gordon, Paul Brinegar, Robert Fuller, Doug McClure, William Smith, Charles Dierkop, William Marshall, Carlene Carter, Waylon Jennings, Kathy Mattea, Reba McEntire, Clint Black, Vince Gill	United States	Comedy Western
Oblivion	Sam Irvin	Richard Joseph Paul	United States	Science fiction Western
Outlaws: The Legend of O.B. Taggart	Rupert Hitzig	Ben Johnson, Mickey Rooney, Randy Travis, Larry Gatlin, Ernest Borgnine, Ned Beatty, Billy Barty, Gloria DeHaven, Nicholas Guest, Rob Word, Christopher Aber, Cliff Gravel, Pamela Rack, Brandon Maggart	United States	
The Outsider	David Briggs	Grainger Hines, Al Hansen	United States	
Rockwell	Richard Lloyd Dewey	Randy Gleave, Scott Christopher	United States	
Silent Tongue	Sam Shepard	Richard Harris, Sheila Tousey, Alan Bates, River Phoenix, Dermot Mulroney, Jeri Arredondo, Tantoo Cardinal, Bill Irwin, David Shiner, Tommy Thompson, Jack Herrick, Bland Simpson, Clay Buckner, Chris Frank	France; Netherlands; United Kingdom; United States	Fantasy/horror Western
Siringo	Kevin G. Cremin	Brad Johnson, Chad Lowe, Crystal Bernard, Stephen Macht, Keith Szarabajka, Floyd Red Crow Westerman, Barry Corbin, William Sanderson, Apesanahkwat, Michael Horton	United States	Traditional Western
Sodbusters	Eugene Levy	Kris Kristofferson, John Vernon, Fred Willard, Wendel Meldrum, Max Gail, Steve Landesberg, John Hemphill, Don Lake, Lou Wagner, George Buza, Jack Duffy, Ronnie Hawkins, Dean McDermott, James Pickens Jr., Natalie Radford, Wayne Robson, Jonathan Scarfe, Maria Vacratsis	Canada	Comedy Western
Texas	Richard Lang	María Conchita Alonso, Benjamin Bratt, Fred Coffin, Patrick Duffy, Chelsea Field, Anthony Michael Hall, Stacy Keach, David Keith, John Schneider, Grant Show, Randy Travis, Rick Schroder, Charlton Heston, Daragh O'Malley, Miguel Sandoval, Lloyd Battista	United States	Traditional Western
Trigger Fast	David Lister	Jürgen Prochnow, Martin Sheen	United States	
Troublemakers	Terence Hill	Terence Hill, Bud Spencer, Boots Southerland, Ruth Buzzi, Jonathan Tucker, Neil Summers, Anne Kasprik, Eva Hassmann, Ron Carey, Fritz Sperberg, Radha Delamarter, John David Garfield, Paul Ukena, Tom Eiden, Bo Gray, Ottaviano Dell'Acqua, Forrie J. Smith, Steven G. Tyler, Massimiliano Ubaldi, Paloma von Broadley, Samantha Waidler, Kevin Barker, Brian Barker, Charlie Barker, Pilar O'Connell, Sarah Waidler, Lauren Myers, Natasha Goslow, Patrick Myers, Jess Hill, Geoffrey Martin, Lou Baker, Michael Huddleston	Italy	Spaghetti Western
Wagons East!	Peter Markle	John Candy, Richard Lewis, John C. McGinley, Ellen Greene, Robert Picardo, Russell Means, Rodney A. Grant, Ed Lauter, Lochlyn Munro, Don Lake, Ethan Phillips, Charles Rocket	United States	Comedy Western
Wyatt Earp	Lawrence Kasdan	Kevin Costner, Dennis Quaid, Gene Hackman, David Andrews, Michael Madsen, Linden Ashby, Bill Pullman, Jeff Fahey, Mark Harmon, Jim Caviezel, John Doe, Joanna Going, Catherine O'Hara, Isabella Rossellini, Tom Sizemore, JoBeth Williams, Mare Winningham, James Gammon, Adam Baldwin, Annabeth Gish, Téa Leoni	United States	Outlaw/Revisionist Western
Wyatt Earp: Return to Tombstone	Paul Landres, Frank McDonald	Hugh O'Brian, Bruce Boxleitner, Paul Brinegar, Harry Carey, Jr., Bo Hopkins, Alex Hyde-White, Martin Kove, Don Meredith, Jay Underwood, Douglas Fowley, John Anderson, Dirk London, Rayford Barnes, Steve Brodie, Lloyd Corrigan	United States	Made for television Western sequel to The Life and Legend of Wyatt Earp with mixed new and archive footage
1995
Black Fox	Steven Hilliard Stern	Christopher Reeve, Tony Todd, Raoul Trujillo, Nancy Sorel, Chris Wiggins, Lawrence Dane, Cynthia Preston, Don S. Davis, Kim Coates, Kelly Rowan	United States; Canada	Traditional Western
Bonanza: Under Attack	Jerry Jameson	Ben Johnson, Michael Landon Jr., Dirk Blocker, Jack Elam, Emily Warfield, Brian Leckner, Jeff Phillips, Richard Roundtree, Dennis Farina, Leonard Nimoy, Ted Markland, J. Gordon Noice, Kenny Call, Sonia Satra	United States	Made for television Western (sequel to the TV series Bonanza)
Buffalo Girls	Rod Hardy	Anjelica Huston, Melanie Griffith, Gabriel Byrne, Reba McEntire, Peter Coyote, Sam Elliott, Tracey Walter, Floyd Red Crow Westerman, Jack Palance, Russell Means, John Diehl	United States	Revisionist Western
Convict Cowboy	Rod Holcomb	Jon Voight, Kyle Chandler, Marcia Gay Harden, Ben Gazzara, Glenn Plummer, Stephen McHattie, Tom Heaton, Jeremy Ratchford	United States	Contemporary Western
Dead Man	Jim Jarmusch	Johnny Depp, Gary Farmer, Crispin Glover, Robert Mitchum, John Hurt, Gabriel Byrne, Lance Henriksen, Iggy Pop, Billy Bob Thornton, Alfred Molina	United States	Acid Western
Desperado	Robert Rodriguez	Antonio Banderas, Salma Hayek, Joaquim de Almeida, Steve Buscemi, Cheech Marin, Quentin Tarantino, Carlos Gomez, Tito Larriva, Danny Trejo, Carlos Gallardo, Angela Lanza	United States	Contemporary Western
The Desperate Trail	P.J. Pesce	Sam Elliott, Craig Sheffer, Linda Fiorentino, Frank Whaley, John Furlong, Boots Southerland, Bradley Whitford	United States	Traditional Western
East Meets West	Kihachi Okamoto	Christopher Mayer, Hiroyuki Sanada	Japan	Samurai Western
A Fistful of Fingers	Edgar Wright	Graham Low	United Kingdom	Comedy Western
Follow the River	Martin Davidson	Sheryl Lee, Ellen Burstyn, Eric Schweig, Tim Guinee, Gabriel Macht	United States	Colonial American frontier
La fuga de los Pérez	Hernando Name	Mario Almada, Hugo Stiglitz	Mexico	Comedy Western
The Good Old Boys	Tommy Lee Jones	Tommy Lee Jones, Sissy Spacek, Terry Kinney, Frances McDormand, Sam Shepard, Joaquin Jackson, Wilford Brimley, Matt Damon, Walter Olkewicz, Blayne Weaver, Bruce McGill	United States	B Western
Gunfighter's Moon	Larry Ferguson	Lance Henriksen, Kay Lenz, David McIlwraith, Nikki DeLoach, Ivan Sergei, James Victor	United States	Romance Western
Hard Bounty	Jim Wynorski	Kelly LeBrock, Matt McCoy	United States	Sex Western
In Pursuit of Honor	Ken Olin	Don Johnson, Craig Sheffer, Gabrielle Anwar, Bob Gunton, James Sikking, John Dennis Johnston, Robert Coleby, Neil Melville, Rod Steiger	United States	Contemporary Western
Last of the Dogmen	Tab Murphy	Tom Berenger, Barbara Hershey, Kurtwood Smith, Steve Reevis, Andrew Miller, Mark Boone Junior, Graham Jarvis, Parley Baer, Molly Parker, Antony Holland, Wilford Brimley	United States	Contemporary/romance Western
Lone Justice 2	Jack Bender	Brad Johnson, Luis Ávalos	United States	B Western
A Mother's Gift	Jerry London	Nancy McKeon, Adrian Pasdar	United States	Made for television Western
Peace Hotel	Ka-Fai Wai	Chow Yun-fat, Cecilia Yip	Hong Kong	Manchurian Western
The Quick and the Dead	Sam Raimi	Sharon Stone, Gene Hackman, Russell Crowe, Leonardo DiCaprio, Pat Hingle, Kevin Conway, Keith David, Lance Henriksen, Mark Boone Junior, Tobin Bell, Roberts Blossom, Gary Sinise, Woody Strode	United States	Outlaw Western
The Ranger, the Cook, and a Hole in the Sky	John Kent Harrison	Sam Elliott, Jerry O'Connell, Ricky Jay, Molly Parker, Don S. Davis, Robert Wisden, Michael Tayles, Tom Butler, Jay Brazeau, A.C. Peterson	United States	Western drama
Riders in the Storm	Charles Biggs	Bo Hopkins, Kim Dawson, Michael Horse	United States	
Savate	Isaac Florentine	Michael Palance, Olivier Gruner, Marc Singer, Ian Ziering, Ashley Laurence, Marc Singer, James Brolin, Rance Howard	United States	
The Scarlet Letter	Roland Joffé	Demi Moore, Gary Oldman, Robert Duvall	United States	Romance Western
Sons of Trinity	Enzo Barboni	Heath Kizzier, Keith Neubert	Italy	Spaghetti Western
Streets of Laredo	Joseph Sargent	James Garner, Sissy Spacek, Sam Shepard, Ned Beatty, Randy Quaid, Wes Studi, Charles Martin Smith, George Carlin, Kevin Conway, James Gammon, Sônia Braga, Míriam Colón, Anjanette Comer	United States	Traditional Western
Tall Tale	Jeremiah S. Chechik	Patrick Swayze, Nick Stahl, Scott Glenn, Oliver Platt, Roger Aaron Brown, Catherine O'Hara, Stephen Lang, Jared Harris, Moira Harris, Joseph Grifasi, John P. Ryan, Scott Wilson, Bert Kramer, William H. Macy, Burgess Meredith	United States	Family fantasy Western
Tecumseh: The Last Warrior	Larry Elikann	Jesse Borrego, David Clennon	United States	Frontier Western
Tom and Huck	Peter Hewitt	Laurence Mark, John Baldecchi	United States	Comedy Western
Wild Bill	Walter Hill	Jeff Bridges, Ellen Barkin, John Hurt, Diane Lane, Keith Carradine, Christina Applegate, Bruce Dern, David Arquette, James Gammon, James Remar, Peter Jason	United States	Revisionist Western
1996
Aquí llega Condemor, el pecador de la pradera	Álvaro Sáenz de Heredia	Aldo Sambrell	Spain	Comedy Western
Brothers of the Frontier	Mark Sobel	Joey Lawrence, Matthew Lawrence, Andrew Lawrence, Mark-Paul Gosselaar, Jonathan Frakes, Don S. Davis, Michael Cram, Sandra Nelson	United States	
The Cherokee Kid	Paris Barclay	Sinbad, James Coburn, Burt Reynolds, Gregory Hines, A Martinez, Ernie Hudson	United States	Comedy Western
Cheyenne	Dimitri Logothetis	Gary Hudson, Bobbie Phillips	United States	
Crazy Horse	John Irvin	Michael Greyeyes, Ned Beatty, Irene Bedard	United States	Biographical Western
Dead Man's Walk	Yves Simoneau	F. Murray Abraham, Keith Carradine, Patricia Childress, Brian Dennehy, Edward James Olmos, Eric Schweig, Harry Dean Stanton, David Arquette, Jonny Lee Miller, Jennifer Garner, Tim Blake Nelson, Molly McClure, Toby Metcalf, Gretchen Mol, Chris Penn, Haviland Morris	United States	Traditional Western
From Dusk till Dawn	Robert Rodriguez	George Clooney, Harvey Keitel, Quentin Tarantino, Juliette Lewis, Salma Hayek, Cheech Marin, Danny Trejo, Tom Savini, Fred Williamson, Michael Parks, John Saxon, Kelly Preston	United States	Horror Western
Last Man Standing	Walter Hill	Bruce Willis, Christopher Walken, Bruce Dern, William Sanderson, David Patrick Kelly, Karina Lombard, R.D. Call, Alexandra Powers, Ted Markland	United States	
Lone Star	John Sayles	Chris Cooper, Elizabeth Peña, Kris Kristofferson, Matthew McConaughey, Míriam Colón, Clifton James, Ron Canada, Joe Morton, Frances McDormand, Tony Plana	United States	Contemporary Western
El Mariachi II	Carlos Gallardo	Carlos Gallardo, Alejandra Prado	Mexico	
Los matones de mi pueblo	Juan José Pérez Padilla		Mexico	Comedy Western
North Star	Nils Gaup	James Caan, Christopher Lambert, Catherine McCormack, Burt Young, Morten Faldaas, Jacques François, Mary M. Walker, Renny Hoalona Loren, Frank Salsedo, Reidar Sørensen, Hilde Grythe, Sverre Anker Ousdal, Nicholas Hope, Frank Krog, Norman Charles	United States	Alaska gold rush Western
Oblivion 2: Backlash	Sam Irvin	Richard Joseph Paul	United States	Science fiction Western
Petticoat Planet	David DeCoteau	Elizabeth Kaitan, Troy Vincent	United States	Space Western
Riders of the Purple Sage	Charles Haid	Ed Harris, Amy Madigan, Henry Thomas, Robin Tunney	United States	Traditional Western
Ruby Jean and Joe	Geoffrey Sax	Tom Selleck, Rebekah Johnson, JoBeth Williams, Ben Johnson, John Diehl	United States	Contemporary Western
Shaughnessy	Michael Ray Rhodes	Matthew Settle, Linda Kozlowski	United States	B Western
The Song of Hiawatha	Jeffrey Shore	Graham Greene, Litefoot, Irene Bedard, Russell Means, Adam Beach, Michael Rooker, David Strathairn, Gordon Tootoosis	United States	Fantasy Western
1997
Blood Trail	Barry Tubb	Barry Tubb, Sarah Essex, Raoul Trujillo	United States	Horror Western
Buffalo Soldiers	Charles Haid	Danny Glover, Mykelti Williamson, Tom Bower, Timothy Busfield, Clifton Powell, Bob Gunton	United States	Cavalry Western
Last Stand at Saber River	Dick Lowry	Tom Selleck, Suzy Amis, David Dukes, Rachel Duncan, Haley Joel Osment, Keith Carradine, David Carradine, Harry Carey Jr., Patrick Kilpatrick, John David Garfield	United States	Traditional Western
Los Locos	Jean-Marc Vallée	Mario Van Peebles, Melora Walters, René Auberjonois, Danny Trejo	Canada	
Once Upon a Time in China and America	Sammo Hung	Jet Li, Rosamund Kwan	Hong Kong	Hybrid Western
The Postman	Kevin Costner	Kevin Costner, Will Patton, Larenz Tate, Olivia Williams, James Russo, Tom Petty, Scott Bairstow, Giovanni Ribisi, Roberta Maxwell, Joe Santos, Charles Esten	United States	Apocalyptic/science fiction Western
Promise the Moon	Ken Jubenville	Henry Czerny, Colette Stevenson, Shawn Ashmore, David Fox, Ricard Donat, Aidan Devine, Gloria May Eshkibok	Canada	B Western drama
Rose Hill	Christopher Cain	Jennifer Garner, Justin Chambers, Jeffrey D. Sams, Justin Chambers, Kevin Zegers, Zak Orth, Vera Farmiga, David Aaron Baker, Stuart Wilson	Canada; United States	B Western drama
The Shooter	Fred Olen Ray	Michael Dudikoff, Randy Travis, Andrew Stevens, William Smith	United States	Traditional Western
1998
Almost Heroes	Christopher Guest	Chris Farley, Matthew Perry, Bokeem Woodbine, Eugene Levy, Lisa Barbuscia, Hamilton Camp, George Aguilar	United States	Comedy Western
Dollar for the Dead	Gene Quintano	Emilio Estevez, William Forsythe, Joaquim de Almeida, Jonathan Banks, Howie Long, Ed Lauter, Lance Kinsey, Jordi Mollà	United States; Spain	
Ebenezer	Ken Jubenvill	Jack Palance, Ricky Schroder, Amy Locane, Albert Schultz, Daryl Shuttleworth, Richard Comar, Michelle Thrush, Richard Halliday, Susan Coyne, Joshua Silberg	United States	Fantasy Western
Gunfighter	Christopher Coppola	Robert Carradine, Martin Sheen	United States	B Western
Gunslinger's Revenge (aka, Il Mio West)	Giovanni Veronesi	Leonardo Pieraccioni, Harvey Keitel, David Bowie, Sandrine Holt, Alessia Marcuzzi, Jim van der Woude, Yudii Mercedi, Michelle Gomez, Rosalind Knight, Jimmy Herman	Italy	Spaghetti Western
The Hi-Lo Country	Stephen Frears	Woody Harrelson, Billy Crudup, Patricia Arquette, Penélope Cruz, Cole Hauser, Sam Elliott, James Gammon, Katy Jurado, Enrique Castillo, Darren Burrows, Jacob Vargas, John Diehl, Lane Smith, Rosaleen Linehan, Leon Rausch, Don Walser, Marty Stuart, Chris O'Connell, Connie Smith	United States	Contemporary Western
The Horse Whisperer	Robert Redford	Robert Redford, Kristin Scott Thomas, Scarlett Johansson, Sam Neill, Dianne Wiest, Chris Cooper, Kate Bosworth, Jeanette Nolan, Allison Moorer	United States	Contemporary Western
The Mask of Zorro	Martin Campbell	Antonio Banderas, Anthony Hopkins, Catherine Zeta-Jones, Stuart Wilson, Matt Letscher, Tony Amendola, Pedro Armendáriz, Jr., Victor Rivers, L.Q. Jones, Julieta Rosen, Maury Chaykin	United States	
The Newton Boys	Richard Linklater	Matthew McConaughey, Ethan Hawke, Skeet Ullrich, Vincent D'Onofrio, Dwight Yoakam, Julianna Margulies	United States	Contemporary Western
Perro de cadena	Fernando Durán Rojas	Hugo Stiglitz	Mexico	
The Ransom of Red Chief	Bob Clark	Haley Joel Osment, Christopher Lloyd, Michael Jeter	United States	Comedy Western
The Staircase	Karen Arthur	Barbara Hershey William Petersen	United States	Made for TV faith-based film
Still Holding On: The Legend of Cadillac Jack	David Burton Morris	Clint Black, Lisa Hartman Black, Bill Bolender, Robert Norsworthy, Joe Stevens, Sean Hennigan, Mac Davis, Rodger Boyce	United States	Contemporary Western
Two for Texas	Rod Hardy	Kris Kristofferson, Scott Bairstow, Tom Skerritt, Peter Coyote, Irene Bedard, Rodney A. Grant, Victor Rivers, Tom Schuster, Rodney A. Grant, Marco Rodríguez, Lonnie Rodriguez, Julio Cesar Cedillo, Woody Watson, Carlos Compean, Alex Morris, James Terry McIlvain, Rodger Boyce	United States	Made for television film based on the Texas War of Independence
Vampires	John Carpenter	James Woods, Daniel Baldwin, Sheryl Lee	United States	Horror Western
La vuelta de El Coyote	Mario Camus	José Coronado, Nigel Davenport	Spain	
1999
From Dusk Till Dawn 2: Texas Blood Money	Scott Spiegel	Robert Patrick, Bo Hopkins, Duane Whitaker	United States	Horror Western
The Jack Bull	John Badham	John Cusack, John Goodman, L.Q. Jones, Miranda Otto, John C. McGinley, Rodney A. Grant, Rex Linn, Drake Bell, Scott Wilson	United States	Traditional Western
The Long Road Home	Craig Clyde	Michael Ansara, Mary Elizabeth Winstead, T.J. Lowther, Craig Clyde	United States	Contemporary/family Western
Outlaw Justice	Bill Corcoran	Willie Nelson, Kris Kristofferson, Waylon Jennings, Travis Tritt	United States	Outlaw Western
Phantom Town	Jeff Burr	John Patrick White, Taylor Locke, Lauren Summers	Canada; United States; Romania	Horror Western
Purgatory	Uli Edel	Sam Shepard, Eric Roberts, Donnie Wahlberg, Randy Quaid, Brad Rowe, Peter Stormare, JD Souther, Amelia Heinle, Shannon Kenny, John Dennis Johnston, R.G. Armstrong	United States	Fantasy/horror Western
Ravenous	Antonia Bird	Robert Carlyle, Jeffrey Jones, Guy Pearce	United States	Horror Western
Ride with the Devil	Ang Lee	Tobey Maguire, Skeet Ulrich, Jewel, Jeffrey Wright, Simon Baker, Jonathan Rhys Meyers, Jim Caviezel, Mark Ruffalo, Tom Wilkinson, Margo Martindale	United States	Revisionist Western
Wild Wild West	Barry Sonnenfeld	Will Smith, Kevin Kline, Kenneth Branagh, Salma Hayek, M. Emmet Walsh, Ted Levine	United States	Steampunk/comedy Western
You Know My Name	John Kent Harrison	Sam Elliott, Arliss Howard, R. Lee Ermey, James Gammon, Carolyn McCormick, James Parks	United States	

== See also ==
- List of westerns on television
