= Lorne Cardinal =

Canadian actor and director (b.1964)

- Born: 6 January 1964 (age 62); Sucker Creek, Alberta, Canada
- Education: University of Alberta, (BFA), Thompson Rivers University (Honorary D.Litt)
- Occupations: Actor; director; producer; writer; voice artist; dramaturg
- Years active: 1994–present
- Known for: Corner Gas
- Spouse: Monique Hurteau (m. 2018)

Lorne Cardinal (born 6 January 1964) is a Canadian stage, television and film actor, and stage and TV director. He is best known for portraying Daniel Deela on the Canadian drama series North of 60 and Sergeant Davis Quinton on the comedy series Corner Gas.

== Early life ==
Cardinal is of Cree descent, and was born near High Prairie, Alberta on a reserve of the Sucker Creek First Nation. His parents both attended the residential school system.

He obtained a B.F.A. degree in acting from the University of Alberta in 1993, the first Indigenous student to do so.

Cardinal is also a rugby union enthusiast. He played for the Edmonton Druids RFC and then the Strathcona Druids, and was the first Indigenous person to play for the latter team. In his role in Corner Gas, he is shown wearing Saskatchewan Prairie Fire rugby team merchandise.

== Career ==
Cardinal has had a variety of roles in theatre, film and television. These include Insomnia, renegadepress.com, Crazy Horse and Wolf Canyon.

He is noted for playing First Nations roles in many productions, including Tecumseh in Canada: A People's History, an aboriginal elder in Tkaronto, and Davis Quinton, a Cree man, on Corner Gas. He also appeared on many episodes of North of 60. Cardinal can be heard as the voice of Jacob Morin on the APTN stop motion animated series Wapos Bay: The Series.

In 2011, Cardinal starred alongside Craig Lauzon in a production of Kenneth T. Williams' play Thunderstick. The two actors traded roles on alternate days. The same year, he collaborated with Frank Moher on a production of Copper Thunderbird at Western Edge Theatre in Nanaimo, British Columbia.

Cardinal completed a documentary film titled Chasing Lear (2016) with producer Monique Hurteau; it premiered on APTN. Chasing Lear explores the National Arts Centre theatre production of King Lear, that had an all-Aboriginal cast. Actors included August Schellenberg as Lear, Billy Merasty, Jani Lauzon, Tantoo Cardinal, and Kevin Loring. Lorne Cardinal did double-duty, serving as assistant director and also carrying the role of Duke of Albany.

He recently starred in the award-winning satirical short film 'No Reservations'. The film looks at pipeline politics and was created as a part of the Crazy8's film competition. As of 2020, Cardinal has a recurring role in the network TV drama FBI: Most Wanted.

In 2023, he had a role in the television series Bones of Crows, an expansion of a film by the same name.

== Personal life ==
Cardinal lives on the coast of British Columbia in Squamish with his wife Monique Hurteau, a producer, writer, and comedian. His brother Lewis, a business consultant and human rights activist in Edmonton, was a New Democratic Party candidate in the 2011 federal election.

Cardinal has eight other siblings who live in several areas of Canada.

== Filmography ==
=== Film ===
| Year | Show | Role | Notes | Ref. |
|---|---|---|---|---|
| 1999 | The Strange Case of Bunny Weequod | Unknown Role | Short | |
| 2002 | Insomnia | Detective Rich | | |
| 2006 | Dream Makers | Himself | Documentary | |
| 2007 | Tkaronto | Max Cardinal | | |
| 2007 | I'm Not the Indian You Had in Mind | Unknown Role | Short | |
| 2008 | Cafe Utopia: Cinéma Trip Tych | Performer #1 | Short | |
| 2008 | Palace | Simon | Short | |
| 2010 | Flicka 2 | Sheriff | Direct to video | |
| 2010 | Rust | Duane | Direct to video | |
| 2010 | Reserved for Hollywood | Himself | Short | |
| 2012 | Higher Ground | Jacob / Father | Short | |
| 2012 | Path of Souls | Dave Courchene | | |
| 2012 | The Soulful Spirit | Robert | | |
| 2013 | The Shape of Rex | Stanley | | |
| 2013 | Pilgrim | "Asshole" | Short | |
| 2013 | If I Had Wings | Coleman | | |
| 2014 | Corner Gas: The Movie | Sergeant Davis Quinton | | |
| 2015 | Canadian Star | Himself | Documentary | |
| 2015 | Disorder | John | Short | |
| 2015 | Into the Forest | Jerry | | |
| 2015 | Open Season: Scared Silly | Sheriff Gordy | Voice; Released in theatres in Turkey while direct to video in North America | |
| 2016 | Chasing Lear | Himself | Director; Executive producer Write; Documentary | |
| 2016 | Gods Acre | Frank | Short | |
| 2016 | The Adventure Club | Curtis | | |
| 2017 | Limina | Mr. Gibbs | Short | |
| 2017 | No Reservations | Joseph Stillwater | Short | |
| 2017 | Never Steady, Never Still | Lenny | | |
| 2017 | Kayak to Klemtu | Don | | |
| 2017 | Good Girls Don't | Larry | | |
| 2017 | Unintentional Mother | Anna's Father | Short | |
| 2018 | The Humanity Bureau | Border Ranger | | |
| 2021 | Back Home Again | Unknown Role | Short | |
| 2021 | Run Woman Run | Len | Short | |
| 2022 | The Bad Seed Returns | Brian | | |
| 2023 | Four Souls of Coyote | Old Man Creator / Grandpa | Voice; Released in theatres in Hungary while dubbed in English | |

=== Television ===
| Year | Show | Role | Notes | Ref. |
|---|---|---|---|---|
| 1994 | Lonesome Dove | Indian Brave | Episodes: "O Western Wind: Part 1" and "Down Come Rain: Part 2" | |
| 1994 | Hawkeye | Brother of The North Wind | Episode: "The Furlough" | |
| 1994 | Frostfire | Dennis | TV movie | |
| 1995 | Tecumseh: The Last Warrior | Loud Noise | TV movie | |
| 1995–1997 | North of 60 | Gambler; Daniel Deela | 6 episodes | |
| 1995–1997 | Jake and the Kid | Moses Lefthand | 21 episodes | |
| 1996 | Crazy Horse | Young Man Afraid | TV movie | |
| 1997 | Out of Nowhere | Unknown Role | TV movie | |
| 1998 | Big Bear | Little Bad Man | Miniseries | |
| 1999 | Exhibit A: Secrets of Forensic Science | Frank Roy | Episode: "Killer in a Box" | |
| 1999 | The City | Gabriel | 4 episodes | |
| 1999 | In the Blue Ground | Daniel Dééla | | |
| 2000 | Thin Air | Bobby Horse | TV movie | |
| 2000–2001 | Canada: A People's History | Harold Cardinal / Mike Mountainhorse / Poundmaker / Tecumseh / Huron Warrior | 5 episodes | |
| 2000–2002 | Wumpa's World | Wumpa The Walrus (voice) | 26 episodes | |
| 2001 | The Associates | Preston Stanley | Episode: "Encumbered" | |
| 2001–2002 | Blackfly | Chief Smack-Your-Face-In | 8 episodes | |
| 2001 | Buffalo Tracks | Himself | Host | |
| 2002 | Relic Hunter | Sheriff Dark Feather | Episode: "Fire in the Sky" | |
| 2003 | Monsters We Met | Sea Tan | Episode: "Eternal Frontier (America, 11,000 years ago)" | |
| 2003 | Another Country | Daniel Deela | TV movie | |
| 2003 | Ice Bound | Unknown Role | TV movie | |
| 2003 | Fallen Angel | The Clerk | TV movie | |
| 2004–2008 | renegadepress.com | Wayne Sinclair | 6 episodes and director | |
| 2004–2009 | Corner Gas | Sergeant Davis Quinton | Main role | |
| 2005 | Distant Drumming: A North of 60 Mystery | Daniel Deela | TV movie | |
| 2005–2010 | Wapos Bay: The Series | Jacob | Voice role | |
| 2006 | Moccasin Flats | Himself | Director; Episode: "Hide and Seek" | |
| 2006 | The Road to Christmas | Chaba | | |
| 2007 | Rabbit Fall | Himself | Director; Episode: "The Weetigo" | |
| 2007 | Elijah | Chief Archie | TV movie | |
| 2008 | Winnipeg Comedy Festival | Himself | Host; Episode: "Hardly Working" | |
| 2008 | Roxy Hunter and the Secret of the Shaman | Lorne Red Deer | TV movie | |
| 2008 | Moccasin Flats: Redemption | Detective #1 | TV movie | |
| 2009 | The Time Traveler | Himself | Producer | |
| 2009 | Wolf Canyon | Rancher Heavyfeather | | |
| 2009 | It's Been a Gas | Himself / Sergeant Davis Quinton | Documentary | |
| 2009 | Memories, Milestones and Moving Forward | Himself | Host | |
| 2010 | Great Canadian Books | Himself | Episode: "Three Day Road" | |
| 2011 | Wapos Bay: Long Goodbyes | Jacob | TV movie | |
| 2011 | Level Up | Principal Storm | TV movie | |
| 2011 | Snowmageddon | Larry | TV movie | |
| 2012 | Arctic Air | Zachary Ward | 4 episodes | |
| 2012 | Primeval: New World | Raymond | Episode: "Sisiutl" | |
| 2012–2013 | Level Up | Principal Storm | | |
| 2013 | If I Had Wings | Angus Coleman | | |
| 2014 | Far from Home | Roger Calhoun | TV movie | |
| 2014 | Fargo | Ray Almond | Episode: "A Fox, A Rabbit and a Cabbage" | |
| 2016 | Unser Traum von Kanada | Harry | Miniseries | |
| 2016 | Going for Broke | Tour Commissioner Fraser | | |
| 2016 | Brewstars | Ned | TV movie | |
| 2016 | Shut Eye | Pete, The Gardener | Episode: "The Fool" | |
| 2017 | Royal Canadian Air Farce | Unknown Role | Episode: "Air Farce Canada 150" | |
| 2017 | Tin Star | Officer Lightfoot | Episode: "Exposure" | |
| 2017 | The Great Northern Candy Drop | Johnny May | Voice; TV movie | |
| 2018–2021 | Corner Gas Animated | Sergeant Davis Quinton | Voice; Main role | |
| 2018 | The Bad Seed | Brian | TV movie | |
| 2018 | Wynter | Gabe | TV movie | |
| 2019–2025 | Molly of Denali | Grandpa Nat | Voice; Main role | |
| 2020 | FBI: Most Wanted | Nelson Skye | Recurring role | |
| 2021 | Big Sky | Bruce Stone | Episode: "Catastrophic Thinking" | |
| 2022 | Rutherford Falls | Bill Wells | Episode: "Aunt Sue" | |
| 2023 | Mittens & Pants | The Narrator | Every Season | |
| 2023 | Bones of Crows | Stephen Means | Episodes: "To Be Here" & "To Let Go" | |
| 2024-2025 | Family Law | Judge Deerfield | 4 episodes | |

== Awards and nominations ==
| Year | Award | Category | Film/Series | Result | Notes |
|---|---|---|---|---|---|
| 2004 | Gemini Award | Best Individual or Ensemble Performance in an Animated Program or Series | Corner Gas | Nominated | Shared with the cast for the episode "Face Off." |
| 2006 | Gemini Award | Best Ensemble Performance in a Comedy Program or Series | Corner Gas | Nominated | Shared with the cast for the episode "Merry Gasmas." |
| 2007 | Gemini Award | Best Ensemble Performance in a Comedy Program or Series | Corner Gas | Won | Shared with the cast, for the episode "Gopher It." |
| 2008 | Gemini Award | Best Individual or Ensemble Performance in an Animated Program or Series | Wapos Bay: The Series | Nominated | Shared with the cast for the episode "The Guardians." |
| 2009 | Leo Award | Best Performance in a Music, Comedy, or Variety Program or Series | Wolf Canyon | Nominated | |
| 2021 | Canadian Screen Awards | Best Performance in an Animated Program or Series | Corner Gas Animated | Won | |

== See also ==
- Indigenous Canadian personalities
