= Trail of Tears (disambiguation) =

Trail of Tears was a series of forced relocations of Native American nations from their ancestral homelands in the Southeastern United States following the passage of the Indian Removal Act of 1830.

Trail of Tears may also refer to:

== Places ==
- Trail of Tears State Forest in southern Illinois
- Trail of Tears State Park in Missouri

== Music ==
- Trail of Tears (band), a Norwegian musical group
- Trails of Tears, 2010 album by Jacques Coursil
- Trail of Tears (album), a 1996 album by Billy Ray Cyrus, or the title track
- Trail of Tears, a 1990 album by The Renderers

=== Songs ===
- "Trail of Tears", a song by Guadalcanal Diary, from their 1984 album, Walking in the Shadow of the Big Man
- "Trail of Tears", a song by John Denver, on his 1985 album, Dreamland Express, covered by Hal Ketchum on his 1992 album Sure Love
- "Trail of Tears", a song by Eric Johnson, from his 1986 album, Tones
- "Trail of Tears", a song by Nuclear Assault, from their 1989 album, Handle with Care
- "Trail of Tears", a song by Testament, from their 1994 album, Low
- "Trail of Tears", a song by Clannad, from their 1996 album, Lore
- "Trail of Tears", a song by Midge Ure, on his 1996 solo album Breathe
- "Trial of Tears", a song by Dream Theater, from their 1997 album, Falling into Infinity
- "Trail of Tears", a song by W.A.S.P., from their 2002 album, Dying for the World

== Other arts and media ==
- The Trail of Tears: Cherokee Legacy, a 2006 documentary film
- "Trail of Tears" (Strangers with Candy), an episode of the television comedy Strangers with Candy
- "Trail of Tears", Season 6 Episode 20 of MacGyver

== See also ==
- Highway of Tears murders
