= Frank von Zerneck =

American television producer (born 1940)

- Born: November 4, 1940 (age 85); New York City, New York, U.S.
- Occupation: Television producer
- Children: Danielle von Zerneck (daughter)
- Relatives: Daniel P. Mannix (father-in-law)

Frank von Zerneck (born November 4, 1940) is an American television producer.

== Career ==
Zerneck's career began as a theater producer in Los Angeles, but the compant was expanded and moved to television in 1974 in a collaboration with Robert Greenwald and Jack Schlissel (although Jack was later withdrawn) through his company Moonlight Productions, which resulted in the Emmy nominated docudrama 21 Hours at Munich. Shortly before that, Schissel had to leave David Merrick as general manager in order to allow to became a producer, while still working for Moonlight. In 1975, he left the Mark Taper Forum in order to refocus his commitment into independent TV movie producing.

The success of the television movie led after years of being based at Paramount Television since 1976, it signed a production deal with Filmways Television in 1978. When Filmways became Orion Pictures, Moonlight Productions signed a deal with ITC Entertainment in 1983. Moonlight was later known as Frank von Zerneck Films. They briefly partnered with former ABC employee Stu Samuels in the mid to late 1980s under the name von Zerneck/Samuels Productions.

In late 1988, Zerneck and fellow producer Robert M. Sertner created von Zerneck/Sertner Films, a long-term venture which has resulted in nearly a hundred television films. Earlier on, in 1988, he signed on to produce television movies for Turner Network Television. Of the company's most notable productions are four Native American films produced for Turner Network Television between 1993 and 1996, which included the Emmy winning Geronimo, Crazy Horse, and Golden Globe nominated Lakota Woman. Tecumseh, which concluded the series, was also critically acclaimed. Recent productions have largely consisted of disaster and true crime dramas. In 2010, Sertner broke off to start his own production company at ABC Studios, which led the company to be renamed as Frank von Zerneck Films.
