= Castel Film Romania =

Romanian film studio and production company

Castel Film Romania is a Romanian film studio and production company started in 1991 by Romanian film producer Vlad Păunescu and Hollywood producer Charles Band. Many Full Moon films were created at Castel including the Josh Kirby series, Trancers 4, Phantom Town, and Hideous. Since its inception in 1992, Castel Film Studios had become one of the most important film studios in Central and Eastern Europe. Castel has produced over 350 films including Cold Mountain, softcore television series Life on Top and recently The Nun. Some of the Castle Film partners are: Warner Bros, Paramount, Miramax, Focus Features, Sony Pictures, Beacon, HBO, Dimension Films, ABC Network, Section Eight, USA Network, Kushner-Locke, Trimark Pictures, Full Moon Entertainment, Granada Media, BOX TV, Esqwad, JLA Production, Les Productions du Tresor, Raphael Films, Noe Productions.
