= The New World (2005 film) =

2005 film by Terrence Malick

- Theatrical release poster
- Directed by: Terrence Malick
- Written by: Terrence Malick
- Produced by: Sarah Green
- Starring: Colin Farrell; Christopher Plummer; Christian Bale; August Schellenberg; Wes Studi; Q'orianka Kilcher
- Cinematography: Emmanuel Lubezki
- Edited by: Richard Chew; Hank Corwin; Saar Klein; Mark Yoshikawa
- Music by: James Horner
- Production companies: First Foot Films; Sarah Green Film; Sunflower Productions
- Distributed by: New Line Cinema (United States); Entertainment Film Distributors (United Kingdom)
- Release date: December 25, 2005 (United States)
- Running time: 150 minutes (2005 limited release); 136 minutes (2006 wide release)
- Countries: United Kingdom; United States
- Languages: English; Powhatan
- Budget: $30 million
- Box office: $49.3 million

The New World is a 2005 historical romantic drama film written and directed by Terrence Malick, depicting the founding of the Jamestown, Virginia, settlement and inspired by the historical figures Captain John Smith, Pocahontas of the Powhatan tribe, and Englishman John Rolfe. It is the fourth feature film written and directed by Malick.

The cast includes Colin Farrell, Christopher Plummer, Christian Bale, August Schellenberg, Wes Studi, David Thewlis, and introduces Q'orianka Kilcher as Pocahontas. Supporting actors include Ben Mendelsohn, John Savage, and Jonathan Pryce. The production team includes director of photography Emmanuel Lubezki, producer Sarah Green, production designer Jack Fisk, costume designer Jacqueline West, composer James Horner and film editors Richard Chew, Hank Corwin, Saar Klein and Mark Yoshikawa.

The New World was a box-office failure even though it received many award nominations for Lubezki's cinematography, Kilcher's acting and Horner's score. The film was initially met with an only mildly positive critical response, although several critics later ranked it as one of the best films of the decade.

== Plot ==
How much they err,
that think everyone which as been at Virginia
understands or knows what Virginia is.

— Capt. John Smith

In 1607, Pocahontas, the adventurous daughter of Chief Powhatan, and others from her tribe witness the arrival of three ships sent by English royal charter to found a colony in the New World. Aboard one ship is Captain John Smith, sentenced to death for mutinous remarks, but once ashore pardoned by Captain Christopher Newport, leader of the expedition.

While the settlement's prospects are initially bright, disease, poor discipline, supply shortages, and tensions with local Native Americans, whom Newport calls "the naturals", jeopardize the expedition. Taking a small group upriver to seek trade while Newport returns to England for supplies, Smith is captured by Native Americans and brought before Chief Powhatan. After being questioned, the captain is nearly executed, but Pocahontas intervenes and he is spared.

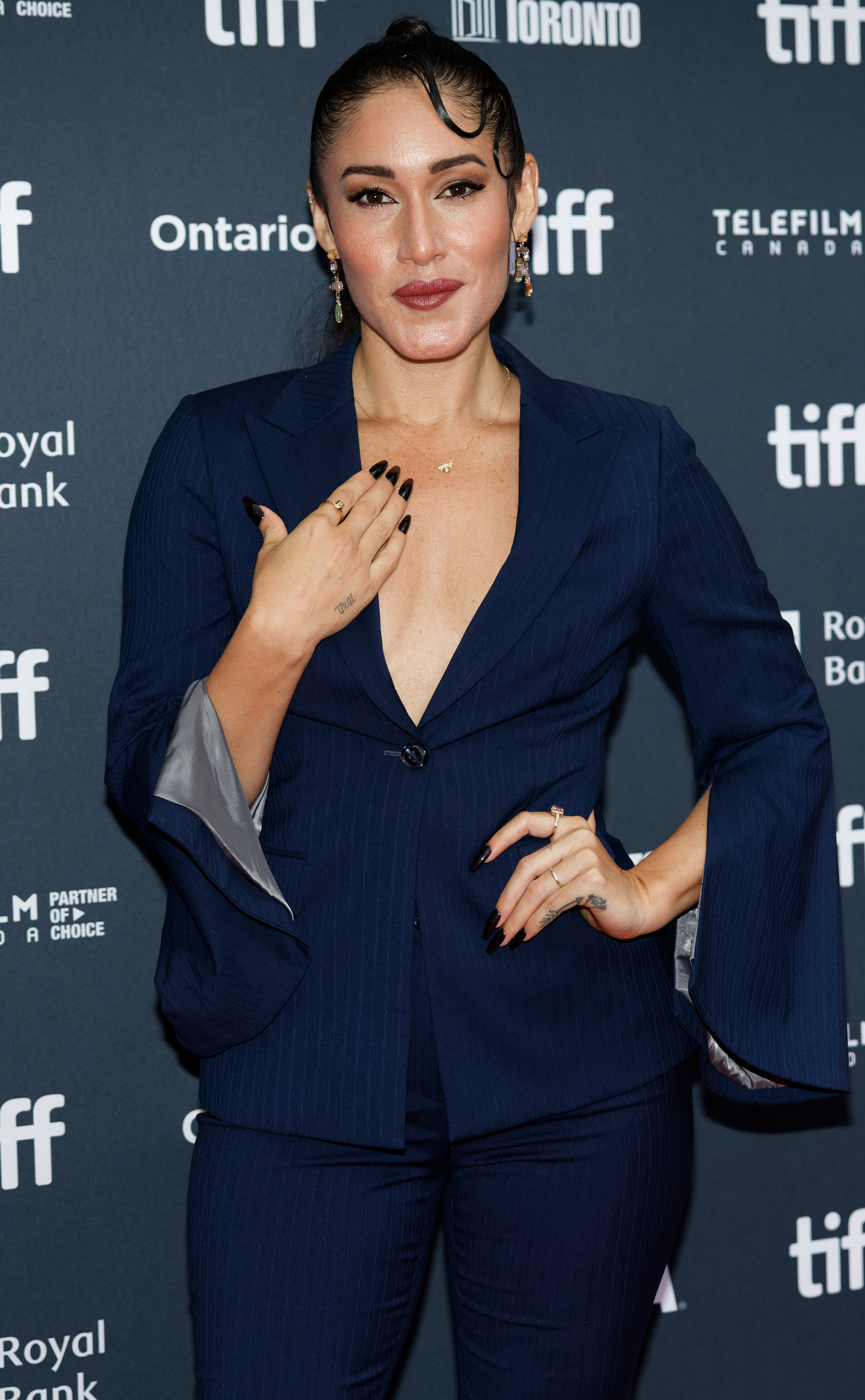
Kilcher portrays Pocahontas

Living as the Native Americans' prisoner, Smith is treated well, earning the tribe's friendship and respect. Coming to admire this new way of life, he falls deeply in love with Pocahontas, who is intrigued by the Englishman and his ways. The chief returns Smith to Jamestown with the understanding that the English are to leave the following spring, once their boats return.

Smith discovers the settlement in turmoil and is pressed into accepting the governorship, finding the peace he had with the Natives replaced by privation, death, and the difficulties of his new position. Smith wishes to return to Pocahontas but dismisses the idea, thinking of his time among the Native Americans as "a dream". The settlers dwindle throughout the brutal winter, and are saved only when Pocahontas and a rescue party arrive with food, clothing, and supplies.

As spring arrives, Powhatan realizes that the English do not intend to leave. Discovering his daughter's actions, he orders an attack on Jamestown and exiles Pocahontas. Repulsing the attack, the settlers learn of Pocahontas's banishment. The English sea captain Samuel Argall, while on a trading expedition up the Potomac River, convinces them to abduct Pocahontas from the Patawomecks as a prisoner in order to negotiate with her father in exchange for captive settlers, but not for their stolen weapons and tools. Opposing this plan, Smith is removed as governor and imprisoned, but renews his love affair after Pocahontas is brought to Jamestown. Captain Newport returns, freeing Smith and telling him of an offer from the king to lead his own expedition to find passage to the East Indies. Torn between his love and his career, Smith decides to return to England. Before departing, he leaves instructions with another settler, who later tells Pocahontas that Smith died in the crossing.

Devastated, Pocahontas sinks into depression. Living in Jamestown, she is eventually comforted by a new settler, John Rolfe, who helps her adapt to the English way of life. She is baptized, educated, and eventually married to Rolfe and gives birth to a son, Thomas. She later learns Captain Smith is still alive, news to which she has a violent reaction; she finds herself rejecting Rolfe and retreats to her loyalty to Smith, thinking fate spared his life and they are to be reunited. Rolfe and his family are given a chance to travel to England. Arriving in London and sharing an audience with the king and queen, Pocahontas is overwhelmed by the wonders of this "New World".

She meets privately with Smith, who admits he may have made a mistake in choosing his career over Pocahontas. He says that what they experienced in Virginia was not a dream but instead "the only truth". Asked if he ever found his Indies, he replies, "I may have sailed past them." They part, never to meet again. Realizing Rolfe is the man she thought he was and more, Pocahontas finally accepts him as her husband and love. The couple make arrangements to return to Virginia, but Pocahontas falls ill and dies near Gravesend. Rolfe still decides to return to Virginia with Thomas.

The film ends with images of the young adult Pocahontas and her young son happily playing in the gardens of their English estate. Rolfe, in a voice-over, reads a letter addressed to their only son about his deceased Native American mother, who is heard to say, "Mother, now I know where you live," with concluding images of nature in the New World.

== Cast ==
- Colin Farrell as Captain John Smith
- Christopher Plummer as Captain Christopher Newport
- Christian Bale as John Rolfe
- August Schellenberg as Chief Powhatan (Wahunsonacock)
- Wes Studi as Opechancanough
- David Thewlis as Edward Wingfield
- Yorick van Wageningen as Samuel Argall
- Q'orianka Kilcher as Pocahontas (Matoaka, Rebecca Rolfe)
- Ben Mendelsohn as Ben
- Raoul Trujillo as Tomocomo
- Brían F. O'Byrne as Lewes
- Irene Bedard as Pocahontas's mother (Nonoma Winanuske Matatiske)
- John Savage as Thomas Savage
- Jamie Harris as Emery
- Alex Rice as Patawomeck's wife
- Michael Greyeyes as Rupwew
- Kalani Queypo as Parahunt
- Noah Taylor as Selway
- Ben Chaplin as Robinson
- Janine Duvitski as Mary
- Eddie Marsan as Eddie
- Thomas Clair as Patawomeck (Japazaw)
- Billy Merasty as Kiskiack
- Jonathan Pryce as King James VI & I
- Alexandra Malick as Queen Anne
- Roger Rees as Virginia Company Representative (uncredited)

== Production ==
=== Development ===
Terrence Malick began work on the script for The New World in the late 1970s. After The Thin Red Line, Malick worked on a film about Che Guevara and his failed revolution in Bolivia. When financing had yet to come through, Malick was offered the chance to direct The New World and left the Guevara project in March 2004. Production on The New World was underway by July of that year.

=== Filming ===
The New World was the first collaboration between Malick and cinematographer Emmanuel Lubezki. The film was notable for its emphasis on authenticity, from location, settings and costumes to the casting of Native American actors and extras who were trained by Blair Rudes, professor of linguistics at UNC-Charlotte, to speak a form of the extinct Powhatan language (a type of Virginian Algonquian) reconstructed for the film by Rudes. Some footage was also filmed at Hatfield House in Hertfordshire, England. Principal photography wrapped after three and a half months in November 2004.

=== Post-production ===
The film was originally set to be released in November 2005, but release had to be postponed. Malick was still editing the footage he had shot. He is well known for editing his films up until the last minute, often trimming his films and leaving entire characters out of the final print, as is the case with The Thin Red Line. In early December, a 150-minute version was shown to critics for awards season consideration. It was released for a week from Christmas to New Year's Day in two theaters each in Los Angeles and New York to qualify for the Academy Awards.

For the film's wide release, which began on January 20, 2006, Malick re-edited the film, cutting it to 135 minutes, but also adding footage not seen in the first release. He altered some of the film's extensive voiceovers to clarify the plot. Substantial changes were made to the first half-hour of the picture, seemingly to speed the plot along.

=== Music ===
The New World

Film score by James Horner
- Released: January 24, 2006
- Label: WaterTower

James Horner chronology
The Legend of Zorro (2005)	The New World (2006)	All the King's Men (2006)

Professional ratings
Review scores
Source	Rating
Filmtracks	4/5 stars
Movie Music UK	4/5 stars
Movie Wave	4.5/5 stars
SoundtrackNet	3.5/5 stars

The musical score for The New World was composed by James Horner. He worked first from the script and then from edited scenes. As the film was re-edited, more changes to the score were required. Because Malick's editing was extensive and involved reordering or dropping passages or inserting sequences, much of Horner's score was not used. For the final version, Malick used sections of Horner's music along with the prelude to Wagner's Das Rheingold, Mozart's Piano Concerto No. 23, and other pieces. Horner and Glen Ballard wrote and recorded the song "Listen to the Wind", sung by Hayley Westenra, for the closing credits, but this too was unused.

== Reception ==
On Rotten Tomatoes the film holds an approval rating of 63% based on 189 reviews, with an average rating of 7.1/10. The site's critics consensus reads, "Despite arresting visuals and strong lead performances, The New World suffers from an unfocused narrative that will challenge viewers' attention spans over its 2 1/2 hours." Review aggregator Metacritic gave the film a score of 73 out of 100, based on 38 critics, indicating "generally favorable reviews". Audiences polled by CinemaScore gave the film an average grade of "D+" on an A+ to F scale.

Roger Ebert awarded the film a full four out of four, arguing that "what distinguishes Malick's film is how firmly he refuses to know more than he should...The events in his film, including the tragic battles between the Indians and the settlers, seem to be happening for the first time." He also lauded Malick as a "visionary". Mick LaSalle of the San Francisco Chronicle hailed the film as "a masterpiece", while others such as Ty Burr of The Boston Globe, Peter Travers of Rolling Stone, Richard Corliss of Time, and David Ansen of Newsweek gave positive reviews.

On the other hand, Stephen Hunter of The Washington Post faulted the film for being "stately almost to the point of being static", while Joe Morgenstern of The Wall Street Journal criticized it as "sluggish", "underdramatized", and "emotionally remote". While its release was timed for consideration for the awards season, it was nominated only for the Academy Award for Best Cinematography for Emmanuel Lubezki at the 78th Academy Awards.

In November 2009, Time Out New York ranked the film as the fourth best of the decade, saying, "The particular power of this tone poem comes from how quietly resigned both characters are to their fates, as if they sense a guiding hand in their every action. The final passages of Malick's idyll, after Pocahontas takes a fateful ocean journey, are the finest work of his career, most notably in his portrayal of the princess's death and transfiguration—a shattering five-minute sequence that never fails to move." In January 2010, Mick LaSalle of the San Francisco Chronicle designated it the number one film of the decade:

Terence Malick's one-of-a-kind film, about the life of Pocahontas and the dawn of American history, contains some of the best filmmaking imaginable – some of it beyond imagining. I have seen it at least five times and have no idea how Malick knew, when he put it all together, that the movie would even make sense. It's difficult to write a great short poem. It's difficult to write a great long novel. But to write a great long poem that's the size of a great long novel – one that makes sense, doesn't flag and is exponentially better than the short poem or the long novel ever would have been – that's almost impossible. Malick did it. With images.

The French film magazine Cahiers du cinéma ranked the film as 9th place in its list of best films of the decade 2000–2009. Film and television critic Matt Zoller Seitz has said it is his favorite film.

In The Guardian, John Patterson writes that The New World "doesn't have fans, just fanatics":

This decade hasn't been up to much, movie-wise, but I am more than ever convinced that when every other scrap of celluloid from 2000-2009 has crumbled to dust, one film will remain, like some Ozymandias-like remnant of transient vanished glory in the desert. And that film is The New World, Terrence Malick's American foundation myth, which arrived just as the decade reached its dismal halfway point, in January 2006. ... The New World is a bottomless movie, almost unspeakably beautiful and formally harmonious. The movie came and went within a month, and its critical reception was characterised for the most part by bafflement, condescension, lazy ridicule and outright hostility. ... Its siblings are to be found throughout movie history and across all national and stylistic boundaries, from the silents to Jean-Luc Godard, James Benning and Stan Brakhage, or in Winstanley and Barry Lyndon. Its cultural hinterland is made up not just of other movies, but of Buddhism, ethnography and naturalism, Wagner, Mozart and the structural forms of classical music, Malick's enthusiasm for bird-watching, and a helping of Heidegger and Kant ... It is both ancient and modern, cinema at its purest and most organic, its simplest and most refined.

Pocahontas, 1616 copper engraved print by Simon van de Passe

In a contribution to The cinema of Terrence Malick: Poetic visions of America, film scholar Mark Cousins writes, "By the end of The New World, it seemed to me, I had experienced something like a Bach's Mass in B minor or a poem by Percy Bysshe Shelley. It was about rapture and the end of rapture. It showed me seeing. It made me sensible."

In a 2016 international critics' poll conducted by the BBC, The New World was voted the 39th-greatest film since 2000.

=== Historical accuracy ===
Most scholars agree that there was no romantic relationship between Pocahontas and Smith. She would have been 12 years old in 1608 when they were said to have first met. The film also depicts Pocahontas's marriage with Rolfe as being more peaceful and socially accepted than it was historically.

== Awards and nominations ==
Awards/Awards Body	Cast/crew member	Category	Result
Academy Awards	Emmanuel Lubezki	Best Achievement in Cinematography	Nominated
ALMA Awards	Q'orianka Kilcher	Outstanding Actress in a Motion Picture	Won
Broadcast Film Critics Association	James Horner	Best Composer	Nominated
Broadcast Film Critics Association	Q'orianka Kilcher	Best Young Actress	Nominated
Chicago Film Critics Association	Emmanuel Lubezki	Best Achievement in Cinematography	Nominated
Chicago Film Critics Association	Q'orianka Kilcher	Most Promising Performer	Nominated
Mar del Plata Film Festival	Emmanuel Lubezki	Kodak Award	Won
Mar del Plata Film Festival	Terrence Malick	Best Film	Nominated
National Board of Review	Q'orianka Kilcher	Best Breakthrough Performance by an Actress	Won
Online Film Critics Society Awards	Q'orianka Kilcher	Best Breakthrough Performance	Nominated
Online Film Critics Society Awards	Emmanuel Lubezki	Best Cinematography	Nominated
Online Film Critics Society Awards	James Horner	Best Original Score	Nominated
San Diego Film Critics Society Awards	Emmanuel Lubezki	Best Cinematography	Won
Washington DC Area Film Critics Association	Q'orianka Kilcher	Best Breakthrough Performance	Nominated
Young Artist Awards	Q'orianka Kilcher	Best Performance in a Feature Film (Comedy or Drama) – Leading Young Actress	Nominated

== Home media ==
A third, 172-minute version, dubbed "The Extended Cut", was issued by New Line on DVD in October 2008. It contains new scenes and expansions to other scenes. The 135-minute and 172-minute cuts are widely available on DVD worldwide, with the 172-minute cut also released on Blu-ray. The 150-minute version was released commercially only twice—as a Digital Download briefly available to buyers of the US "Extended Cut" DVD in 2008, and on DVD in Italy as part of Italian distributor Eagle Pictures's 2-disc set, containing both the 150-minute and 135-minute versions of the film.

On July 26, 2016, all three cuts were released on Blu-ray and DVD in the United States by The Criterion Collection with the 172-minute extended cut from a new 4K digital restoration supervised by cinematographer Emmanuel Lubezki and director Terrence Malick.
