= Wes Studi =

Cherokee actor and film producer (born 1947)

- ᏪᏌ ᏍᏚᏗ
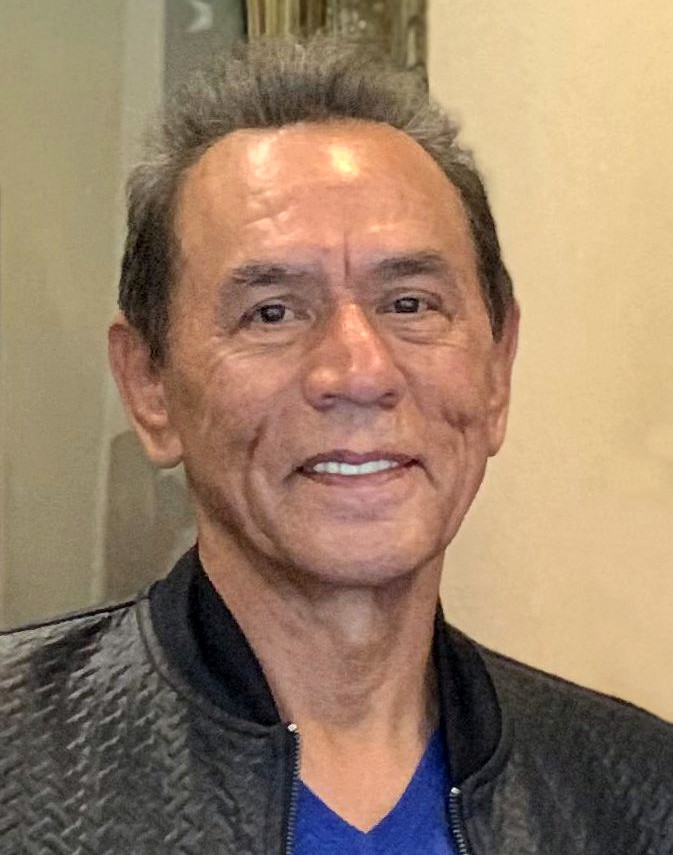
- Studi in 2019
- Born: Wesley Studi; December 17, 1947 (age 78); Nofire Hollow, Oklahoma, U.S.
- Citizenship: American; Cherokee Nation
- Education: Tulsa Community College
- Occupations: Actor; producer
- Years active: 1972–present
- Political party: American Indian Movement (1972–1974)
- Spouse(s): Rebecca Graves (m. 1974; div. 1982); Maura Dhu Studi (m. 1986)
- Children: 3
- Relatives: Jack Albertson (father-in-law); Nancy Ward (sixth great-grandmother)
- Military career
- Allegiance: United States
- Branch: United States Army
- Service years: 1963–1969
- Rank: Sergeant
- Unit: 39th Infantry Regiment
- Conflict: Vietnam War
- Website: wesleystudi.com

Wesley Studi (Cherokee: ᏪᏌ ᏍᏚᏗ, romanized: Wesa Sdudi; born December 17, 1947) is a Cherokee actor and film producer. He has garnered critical acclaim and awards throughout his career, particularly for his portrayal of Native Americans in film. In 2019, he received an Academy Honorary Award, becoming the first Native American as well as the first Indigenous person from North America to be honored by the academy.

Studi has appeared in Academy Award-winning films, such as Dances with Wolves (1990) and The Last of the Mohicans (1992), and in the Academy Award-nominated films Geronimo: An American Legend (1993) and The New World (2005). He is also known for portraying Sagat in Street Fighter (1994). Other films he has appeared in are Heat, Hostiles, Mystery Men, Avatar, A Million Ways to Die in the West, and the television series Penny Dreadful.

In December 2020, The New York Times ranked him No. 19 in its list of the "25 Greatest Actors of the 21st Century (So Far)".

== Early life and education ==
Studi was born into a Cherokee family in Nofire Hollow, Oklahoma, a rural area in Cherokee County named after his mother's family. He is the son of Maggie Studie, a housekeeper, and Andy Studie, a ranch hand. Until he attended elementary school, he spoke only Cherokee at home. He attended Chilocco Indian Agricultural School for high school and graduated in 1964; his vocational major was in dry cleaning. In 2024, Studi appeared on the television series Finding Your Roots and learned that Eugene Philpott, who was listed on his birth certificate, was not his biological father. Researchers later determined that his father was one of two brothers, Jess and Bobby Blair. Also during that episode, it was discovered his 6th great-grandmother was Nanyehi, a Ghigau and Cherokee leader.

At the age of 17, Studi enlisted in the Oklahoma National Guard and had his basic combat training and advanced individual training at Fort Polk, Louisiana. Studi volunteered for active service and went to Vietnam with the 3rd Battalion 39th Infantry, 9th Infantry Division, where he served for 12 months.

After his discharge, Studi became politically involved in Native American activism. He joined the American Indian Movement in 1972 and participated in the Trail of Broken Treaties, where hundreds of Native American activists marched on Washington. He was also one of the protesters who briefly occupied the Bureau of Indian Affairs Building there. He participated in the Wounded Knee Incident at Pine Ridge Reservation in 1973, and was arrested. Studi stated in an interview that he first began acting while attending Tulsa Community College, after returning from his service in Vietnam. He had a role in the play The Royal Hunt of the Sun for the American Indian Theater Company.

== Career ==
Studi promotes healthy living among Native Americans

Studi appeared in his first film, The Trial of Standing Bear, in 1988. He is known for his roles as ruthless Native American warriors, such as a Pawnee in Dances with Wolves (1990), and the Huron Magua in The Last of the Mohicans (1992).

A year later, he was cast with Eric Schweig for TNT's film The Broken Chain, about the historic Iroquois League that was based in the area of central and western present-day New York state. It was shot in Virginia. This was part of a group of productions shown over 14 months on TNT as its "Native American initiative", including three television movies and several documentaries. A six-hour history series was told from a Native American perspective. In 1993 Studi had the lead in Geronimo: An American Legend. He played the superhero Sphinx in the 1999 comedy film Mystery Men.

In 2002, Studi brought to life the character of Police Lieutenant Joe Leaphorn, for a series of PBS movies based on Tony Hillerman's novels set in the Southwest among the Navajo and Hopi. It was produced by Robert Redford. Some movie titles include "Skinwalkers", "Coyote Waits", "A Thief of Time".

In 2005, Studi portrayed a character based on chief Opechancanough, leader of the Powhatan Confederacy in Virginia, in the film The New World directed by Terrence Malick.

In 2009, Studi appeared as Major Ridge, a leader of the Cherokee before the Native American removal to Indian Territory, in Trail of Tears. This was the third of five episodes in the PBS series We Shall Remain, portraying critical episodes in Native American history after European encounter, part of the public television's acclaimed series American Experience, where Studi spoke only in native Cherokee.

Also in 2009, Studi appeared in James Cameron's Avatar as Na'vi chief Eytukan. Studi played Cheyenne chief Yellow Hawk in a starring role in the 2017 film Hostiles.

At the 90th Academy Awards, Studi introduced a tribute to military movies, and gave part of his speech in the Cherokee language, of which he is a fluent speaker. Studi is the second Native American actor to present at the Academy Awards. Will Rogers hosted in 1934.

In 2019, he received an Academy Honorary Award, becoming the first Native American actor to receive an Oscar specifically for acting. In his acceptance speech, Studi said: "I'd simply like to say, it's about time. It's been a wild and wonderful ride, and I'm really proud to be here tonight as the first Indigenous Native American to receive an Academy Award. It's a humbling honour to receive an award for something I love to do."

In December 2020, The New York Times ranked him No. 19 in its list of the "25 Greatest Actors of the 21st Century (So Far)," noting "Wes Studi has one of the screen's most arresting faces — jutting and creased and anchored with the kind of penetrating eyes that insist you match their gaze. Lesser directors like to use his face as a blunt symbol of the Native American experience, as a mask of nobility, of suffering, of pain that's unknowable only because no one has asked the man wearing it. In the right movie, though, Studi doesn't just play with a character's facade; he peels its layers. A master of expressive opacity, he shows you the mask and what lies beneath, both the thinking and the feeling."

Studi briefly reprised the role of Eytukan via a cameo appearance in the 2025 sequel Avatar: Fire and Ash.

== Personal life ==
After his studies, Studi taught the Cherokee language and syllabary and helped establish a Cherokee-language newspaper. He went into ranching. From his first marriage, Studi has a daughter, Leah, and a son, Daniel. After this marriage ended in divorce, Studi left ranching and started to study acting; a friend had recommended it as a place to meet women.

Studi married Maura Dhu, and they moved their family to a farm near Santa Fe, New Mexico, in the early 1990s. Dhu is the only child of actor Jack Albertson. Wes and Maura Dhu Studi have a son, Kholan. Studi and his wife perform in the band Firecat of Discord. Studi serves as honorary chair of the national endowment campaign of the Indigenous Language Institute in Santa Fe.

Studi endorsed Senator Bernie Sanders for president in the 2016 U.S. presidential election.

== Honors ==
- 1994: Won a Western Heritage Award (shared with cast and crew) for Geronimo: An American Legend (1993).
- 1998: The Dreamspeakers Film and Festival honored Studi with its Career Achievement Award.
- 2000: Motion Picture and Television Fund's Golden Boot Award.
- 2000: Artist of the Decade at the First Americans in the Arts Awards.
- 2013: Inducted into the Hall of Great Western Performers - Western Heritage Award, Oklahoma City, OK
- 2019: Academy Honorary Award.
- 2019: National Multicultural Western Heritage Museum.

== Military awards and decorations ==
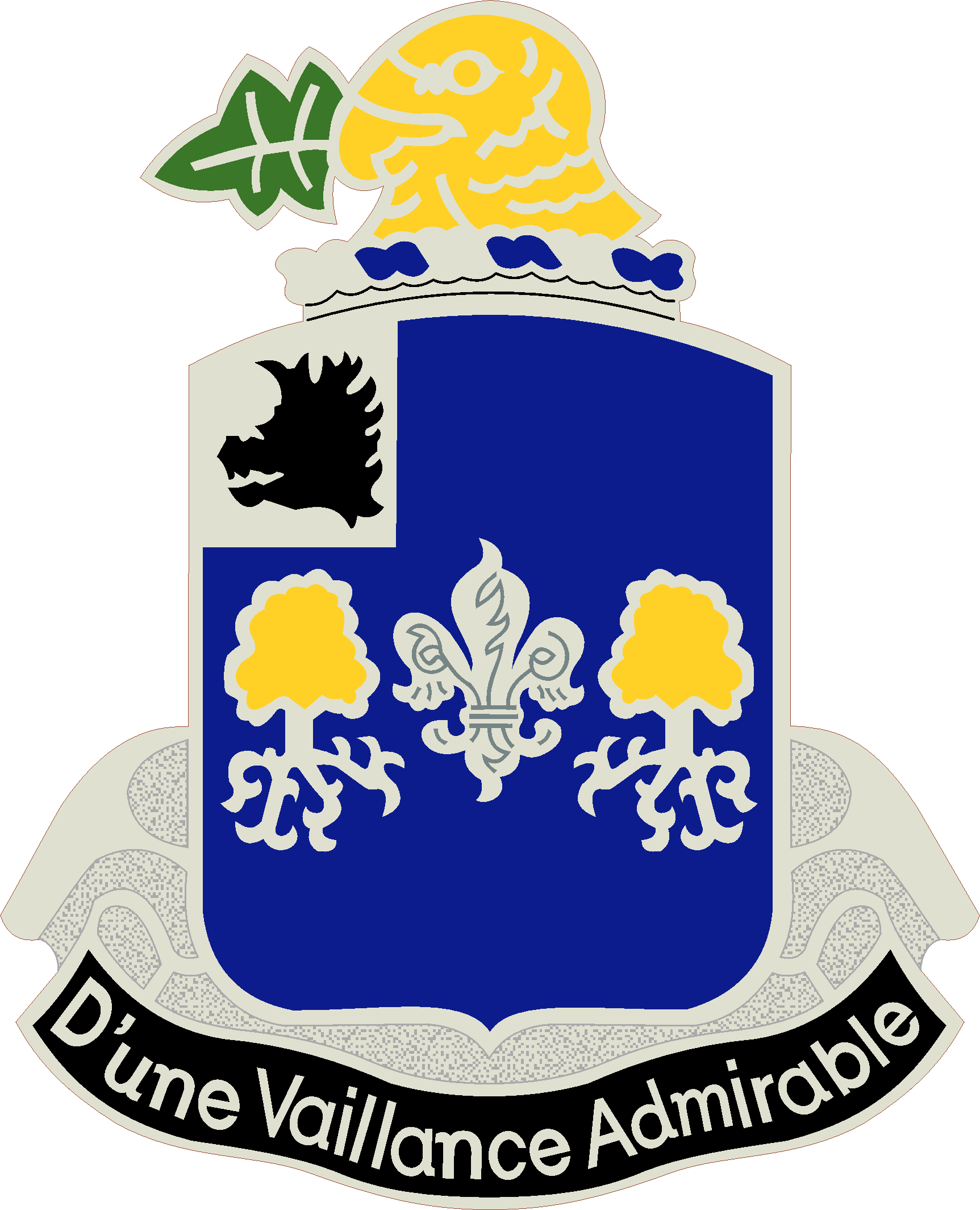

Badge	Combat Infantryman Badge		
1st row	Good Conduct Medal with two bronze loops		
2nd row	National Defense Service Medal	Vietnam Service Medal with three bronze service stars	Vietnam Campaign Medal
Badge	Gallantry Cross Unit Citation		
Badge	9th Infantry Division shoulder sleeve insignia		
Badge	39th Infantry Regiment distinctive unit insignia		

== Filmography ==
=== Film ===
Key
†	Denotes films that have not yet been released

Year	Title	Role	Notes
1989	Powwow Highway	Buff	
1990	Dances with Wolves	Toughest Pawnee	
1991	The Doors	Indian In Desert	
1992	The Last of the Mohicans	Magua	
1993	Geronimo: An American Legend	Geronimo	
1994	Street Fighter	Viktor "Iron Fist" Sagat	
1995	Lone Justice 2	One Horse	
1995	Heat	Detective Sammy Casals	
1997	The Killing Jar	Cameron	
1998	Deep Rising	Hanover	
1998	The Horse Whisperer	Parks Guard	
1998	Soundman	Terry Leonard	
1999	Mystery Men	The Sphinx	
2000	Wind River	Pocatello	
2001	Ice Planet	Commander Trager	
2001	Christmas in the Clouds	Bingo Caller	
2001	Road to Redemption	Frank Lightfoot	
2002	Undisputed	Mingo Pace	
2003	The Ugly One	Father Mike	
2004	Echoes from Juniper Canyon	Grandpa	Voice
2005	Animal	Creeper	Voice
2005	Miracle at Sage Creek	Chief Thomas	
2005	The Making of 'Miracle at Sage Creek'	Himself / Chief Thomas	
2005	The New World	Opechancanough	
2006	Three Priests	Ben	
2006	Making 'The New World'	Himself / Opechancanough	Video documentary
2006	The Trail of Tears: Cherokee Legacy	Himself / Presenter	
2007	Seraphim Falls	Charon	
2008	Older than America	Richard Two Rivers	
2009	Avatar	Eytukan	
2009	The Only Good Indian	Sam Franklin	Also executive producer
2010	Making 'The Last of the Mohicans'	Himself	Video documentary
2012	Being Flynn	Captain	
2012	Call of the Wild	Hatcher	
2013	Sugar	Bishop	
2013	Destination Planet Negro	Native American Chief	
2014	Road to Paloma	Chief Numay Wolf	
2014	A Million Ways to Die in the West	Cochise	
2014	Planes: Fire & Rescue	Windlifter	Voice
2015	The Condemned 2	Cyrus Merrick	
2017	Hostiles	Chief Yellow Hawk	
2019	Badland	Harlen Red	
2019	A Dog's Way Home	Captain Mica	
2020	Soul	Counselor Jerry C.	Voice
2022	A Love Song	Lito	
2022	Mending the Line	Harrison	
2025	Avatar: Fire and Ash	Eytukan	Cameo
2026	The Long Haul		
2027	Seasons †		Filming
TBA	As Deep as the Grave †	Tsali	Post-production
TBA	Timber Lands †		Post-production

=== Television ===
Year	Title	Role	Notes
1988	Longarm	The Ute	Television film
1988	The Trial of Standing Bear	Long Runner	Television film
1990	The Flash	Roller	Episode: "Sins of the Father"
1992	Highlander	Sheriff Benson	Episode: "Mountain Men"
1993	Ned Blessing: The Story of My Life and Times	One Horse	4 episodes
1993	The Broken Chain	Seth	Television film
1994	The 51st Annual Golden Globe Awards	Himself / Presenter	Television special
1995	500 Nations	(voice)	3 episodes
1995	Streets of Laredo	Famous Shoes	3 episodes
1995	The Way West	Voice	Television documentary
1996	Crazy Horse	Red Cloud	Television film
1997	Adventures from the Book of Virtues	Scarface (voice)	Episode: "Perseverance"
1997	Promised Land	Jesse Rainbird	Episode: "Outrage"
1997	Big Guns Talk: The Story of the Western	Himself	Television documentary
2001	The Directors	Himself	Episode: "The Films of Michael Mann"
2002	UC: Undercover	Armando Uribe	Episode: "Hunting Armando"
2002	Skinwalkers	Lieutenant Joe Leaphorn	Television film
2003	The Lone Ranger	Kulakinah	Television film
2003	A Thief of Time	Lieutenant Joe Leaphorn	Television film
2003	Coyote Waits	Lieutenant Joe Leaphorn	Television film
2003	Edge of America	Cuch	Television film
2005	Into the West	Black Kettle	Episode: "Hell on Wheels"
2007	Bury My Heart at Wounded Knee	Wovoka	Television film
2008	Comanche Moon	Buffalo Hump	3 episodes
2009	We Shall Remain	Major Ridge / Warrior in Canoe	2 episodes
2009	Kings	General Linus Abner	6 episodes
2009	Saving Grace	Bobby's Dad	Episode: "That Was No First Kiss"
2010	The Mentalist	Joseph Silverwing	Episode: "Aingavite Baa"
2011	Images of Indians: How Hollywood Stereotyped the Native American	Himself / Toughest Pawnee	Television documentary
2011–2012	Hell on Wheels	Chief Many Horses	3 episodes
2012	In Plain Sight	Chief Pierce	Episode: "Reservations, I've Got a Few"
2013	Battledogs	Captain Falcons	Television film
2014	Killer Women	White Deer	Episode: "Demons"
2015	The Red Road	Chief Levi Gall	5 episodes
2015	SuperMansion	Hawk Feathers (voice)	Episode: "Puss in Books"
2016	Penny Dreadful	Kaetenay	9 episodes
2020	Woke	Spoon (voice)	Episode: "Rhymes with Broke"
2021	Grey's Anatomy	William Lawrence	Episode: "Tradition"
2021	Miracle Workers	Chief Sleeping Bear	Episode: "Oregon Trail: White Savior"
2021–2023	Reservation Dogs	Bucky	4 episodes
2022–present	Spirit Rangers	Sunny (voice)	Recurring role
2023	The Proud Family: Louder and Prouder	Quannah (voice)	Episode: "Old Towne Road Part 2"
2023	Launchpad	Grandpa / Nick	Episode: "The Roof"
