= August Schellenberg =

Canadian actor (1936–2013)

- Born: August Werner Schellenberg; July 25, 1936; Montreal, Quebec, Canada
- Died: August 15, 2013 (aged 77); Dallas, Texas, U.S.
- Resting place: Sparkman-Hillcrest Memorial Park Cemetery
- Other name: Augie Schellenberg
- Education: National Theatre School of Canada
- Occupation: Actor
- Years active: 1964–2013
- Spouse: Joan Karasevich
- Children: 3
- Website: augustschellenberg.com

August Werner Schellenberg (July 25, 1936 – August 15, 2013) was a Canadian actor. He played Randolph in the first three installments of the Free Willy film series (1993–1997) as well as characters in Black Robe (1991), The New World (2005), and dozens of other films and television shows.

During his career, Schellenberg won a Gemini Award in 1986 and a Genie Award in 1991, as well as being nominated for a Primetime Emmy Award in 2007.

== Life and career ==
Schellenberg was born and lived in Montreal, Quebec, until he moved to Toronto, Ontario, in 1967. He was of English, Mohawk and Swiss-German descent. He also spoke French. He was based in Toronto until 1995. He lived in Dallas, Texas, with his wife, actress Joan Karasevich. He was the father of three daughters, two with Karasevich. He was trained at the National Theatre School of Canada from 1963 to 1966.

His initial work was in the Don Shebib-directed coming-of-age film Rip-Off, in 1971. In 1981, he did voices for the animated film Heavy Metal. During the 1990s he had major roles in Black Robe (as Chomina), Free Willy and its sequels (as Randolph Johnson), Iron Will (Ned Dodd), True Heart (Khonanesta), and TV film Crazy Horse (Sitting Bull). He went on to star as Chief Powhatan in Terrence Malick's 2005 film The New World. He also had roles in Disney's Eight Below and in the doco The Green Chain (2007). In 2011, he appeared in two episodes of the television series Stargate Universe as Yaozu. His favorite role was that of Sitting Bull in the film Crazy Horse, a character he reprised in the film version of the Dee Brown bestseller Bury My Heart at Wounded Knee, for which he received an Emmy nomination. He also starred in Dreamkeeper (2003) as Pete Chasing Horse.

Schellenberg was nominated for three Genie Awards and won one (for Black Robe). He was also nominated for two Gemini Awards, and won one (for the television movie The Prodigal).

In 2012, he performed the title role in an all-aboriginal production of William Shakespeare's King Lear at the National Arts Centre in Ottawa, alongside a cast that also included Billy Merasty as Gloucester, Tantoo Cardinal as Regan, Jani Lauzon in a dual role as Cordelia and the Fool, Craig Lauzon as Kent, and the play's assistant director, Lorne Cardinal, as The Duke of Albany.

During his lifetime, Schellenberg taught acting seminars at Toronto's Centre for Indigenous Theatre and York University. He conducted motivational workshops in schools and for cultural and community organizations across North America. Schellenberg's younger brother played Dior in Grey's Anatomy, season 5. Shortly after that, August died of lung cancer.

== Death ==
Schellenberg died of lung cancer on August 15, 2013, in Dallas, Texas, after a long illness. He was interred at Sparkman-Hillcrest Memorial Park Cemetery.

== Filmography ==
=== Film ===
- Rip-Off (1971)
- A Fan's Notes (1972)
- Between Friends (1973)
- One Man (1977) - Ernie Carrick
- Power Play (1978) - Minh
- Drying Up the Streets (1978) - Nick
- Bear Island (1979) - Marine Technician
- The Coffin Affair (1980) - Wilbert Coffin
- Death Hunt (1981) - Deak De Bleargue
- Heavy Metal (1981) - Norl (segment "Den") / Taarak (segment "Taarna") (voice)
- Kings and Desperate Men (1981) - Stanley Aldini
- Latitude 55° (1982) - Josef Przysiezny
- The Ruffian (1983) - Nelson Harting
- Running Brave (1983) - Billy's Father
- Cross Country (1983) - Glen Cosgrove
- Covergirl (1984) - Joel Vacchio
- Best Revenge (1984) - Captain of 'Recon Star'
- The Painted Door (1984)
- Confidential (1986) - Charles Ripley
- Mark of Cain (1986) - Otto
- Qui a tiré sur nos histoires d'amour (1986) - Fabien
- Long Lance (1986) - (voice)
- Divided Loyalties (1990)
- Black Robe (1991) - Chomina
- Free Willy (1993) - Randolph Johnson
- Iron Will (1994) - Ned Dodd
- Free Willy 2: The Adventure Home (1995) - Randolph Johnson
- Free Willy 3: The Rescue (1997) - Randolph Johnson
- Silence (1997) - Johnny
- True Heart (1997) - Khonanesta
- The Unsaid (2001) - Detective Hannah
- Tremors 4: The Legend Begins (2004) - Tecopa
- Going The Distance (2004) - Emile
- The New World (2005) - Chief Powhatan
- Eight Below (2006) - Mindo
- The Green Chain (2007) - The Executive - John Clements
- Missionary Man (2007) - White Deer
- 45 R.P.M. (2008) - Peter George Moses
- The Last Movie (2012) - Samuel Booker (final film role)

=== Television ===
August Schellenberg television credits
Year	Title	Role	Notes
1964	Shoestring Theatre		Episode: "The Dark Mirror"
1977	The New Avengers	Bailey	Episode: "Forward Base"
1980	The Littlest Hobo	Barney Baxter	Episode: The Pied Piper
1983	The Hitchhiker	Bob Ames	Episode: "When Morning Comes"
1985	Tramp at the Door	Albert Fournier	TV miniseries
1986	The Equalizer	Brennan	Episode: "Unpunished Crimes"
1986	Philip Marlowe, Private Eye	Johnny Tango	Episode: "Blackmailers Don't Shoot"
1986	Lance et compte	Allan Goldberg	1 episode
1987	Airwolf	Gregori Nobokov	Episode: "Deathtrain"
1988	The Return of Ben Casey	Dr. Madigan	TV movie
1989	Champagne Charlie	General Butler	TV miniseries
1990	Counterstrike	Cortez	Episode: "Now and at the Hour of Our Death"
1991	Counterstrike	St. John	Episode: "Native Warriors"
1992	The Adventures of Tintin		English version, voice
1993	Geronimo	Cochise	TV movie
1994	Getting Gotti	Willie Boy Johnson	TV movie
1994	Lakota Woman: Siege at Wounded Knee	Dick Wilson	TV movie
1994	Lonesome Dove: The Series	Chief Iron Bow	TV miniseries. Episode: "Last Stand"
1994–1995	North of 60	Ben Montour	5 episodes
1994–1995	Walker Texas Ranger	Billy Gray Wolf	2 episodes
1995	Tecumseh: The Last Warrior	Black Hoof	TV movie
1996	The Siege at Ruby Ridge	Native American	TV movie
1996	Crazy Horse	Sitting Bull	TV movie
1996	Ken Burns Presents: The West	Various (voice)	TV miniseries documentary. 3 episodes "Speck of the Future" "Death Runs Riot" "Fight No More Forever"
1998	Scattering Dad	Fierce Crow	TV movie
1999	Lakota Moon	Bull Elk	TV movie
2000	So Weird	Tom Martinez	Episode: "Destiny"
2000	High Noon	Antonio	TV movie
2002	Chiefs	Sitting Bull	TV miniseries documentary
2003	Dreamkeeper	Grandpa	TV movie
2004	The Making of "DreamKeeper"	Himself	Video documentary short
2006	Making "The New World"	Himself	Video documentary
2007	Bury My Heart at Wounded Knee	Sitting Bull	TV movie
2008	Grey's Anatomy	Clay Bedonie	Episode: "These Ties That Bind"
2007–2010	Saving Grace	GeePaw	1 episode
