= Geronimo (1993 film) =

TV film

- Home video release poster
- Genre: Biography; Western
- Written by: J.T. Allen
- Directed by: Roger Young
- Starring: Joseph Runningfox; Nick Ramus; Michael Greyeyes; August Schellenberg
- Theme music composer: Patrick Williams
- Country of origin: United States
- Original language: English

Production
- Executive producers: Christopher Cook; Norman Jewison; Robert M. Sertner; Frank von Zerneck
- Producer: Ira Marvin
- Cinematography: Donald M. Morgan
- Editor: Millie Moore
- Running time: 100 minutes
- Production company: Turner Pictures

Original release
- Network: TNT
- Release: December 5, 1993

Geronimo is a 1993 American historical Western television film directed by Roger Young and starring Joseph Runningfox in the title role. It also stars Jimmy Herman and Adan Sanchez, and was distributed by TNT on December 5, 1993.

== Plot ==
The film is a fictionalized account of the Apache leader Geronimo.

== Cast ==
- Joseph Runningfox as Geronimo
- Nick Ramus as Mangas
- Michael Greyeyes as Juh
- Tailinh Agoyo as Alope (credited as Tailinh Forest Flower)
- Jimmy Herman as Old Geronimo
- August Schellenberg as Cochise
- Michelle St. John
- Eddie Spears as Ishkiye
- Nick Young as Purlington
- Cody Lightning as Young Daklugie
- Ray Geer as Teddy Roosevelt
- Annie Olson as Mrs. Roosevelt

== Production ==
It was shot in Tucson, Arizona.

== Reception ==
Geronimo debuted on television five days before the theatrical release of Geronimo: An American Legend. Walter Hill, director of the theatrical film, blamed the poor reception of his film on the screening of the TV movie. Hill said, "I don't think there are a hell of a lot of movies where you can take basically the same story, show it to 50 million people and bring yours out a week later and think that you're going to do great. What can you say, `My Geronimo has better locations?' "
