= Phantom Town =

- Directed by: Jeff Burr
- Screenplay by: Benjamin Carr
- Produced by: Charles Band; Harlan Freedman; Kirk Edward Hansen
- Starring: John Patrick White; Taylor Locke; Lauren Summers; Jim Metzler; Belinda Montgomery; Gabriel Spahiu; Jimmy Herman
- Cinematography: Viorel Sergovici
- Edited by: Barrett Taylor
- Music by: Dennis Smith
- Production companies: Canarom Productions; The Kushner-Locke Company; Castel Film Romania
- Distributed by: Full Moon Entertainment
- Release date: February 16, 1999
- Running time: 95 minutes
- Countries: Canada; United States; Romania
- Language: English
- Budget: $800,000

Phantom Town (later released in 2013 as Spooky Town on DVD) is a 1999 Canadian-American-Romanian horror fantasy Western film directed by Jeff Burr with the screenplay by Benjamin Carr. The film starred John Patrick White, Taylor Locke, Lauren Summers, Jim Metzler, Belinda Montgomery, and Gabriel Spahiu. The film focuses on Mike, a sixteen-year-old boy, and his two younger siblings as they search for their missing parents in the mysterious town of Long Hand, which according to maps does not exist at all.

The film had a runtime of 95 minutes. Phantom Town had an estimated budget of $800,000. The film was filmed at Castel Film Studios in Bucharest, Romania and was released to VHS and DVD on February 16, 1999.

== Plot ==
Three children go on a search to find their parents who mysteriously disappeared after entering a town called Long Hand that isn't found on any map. The children check in at the town's hotel and begin to notice that the residents of Long Hand behave strangely, repeating the same actions over and over. Further exploration of the town leads the children to discover that the town is inhabited by body snatchers, and they could be the next victims. The children eventually find their parents in catacombs located underneath the town, and manage to leave the town with their parents after killing the monster that runs the town. In the end, Mike throws a party and the children discover that their parents had been transformed just like the other residents of Long Hand.

== Cast ==
- John Patrick White as Mike
- Taylor Locke as Arnie
- Lauren Summers as Cindy
- Jim Metzler as Dad
- Belinda Montgomery as Mom
- Gabriel Spahiu as Hotel Clerk
- Jimmy Herman as Attendant
- Jeff Burr as Uncle Jack
- Iuliana Ciugulea as Aunt Silvia
