= Jimmy Herman =

Canadian actor (1940–2013)

- Born: October 25, 1940; Cold Lake First Nations Reserve, Alberta, Canada
- Died: September 13, 2013 (aged 72); Edmonton, Alberta, Canada
- Resting place: Cold Lake First Nations Reserve, Alberta, Canada
- Occupation: Actor
- Years active: 1984–2007

Jimmy Herman (October 25, 1940 – September 13, 2013) was an Indigenous Canadian actor who appeared in several films, including Dances with Wolves.

== Biography ==
He was born on the Cold Lake Reserve in Alberta, Canada. His ancestors were Chipewyan and Dene. Herman moved to Edmonton in 1980 to study at Grant MacEwan College's Native Communications Program. There, he received the Malcolm Calliou Award for his ambition to succeed, and to inspire other Aboriginal people to do the same. After his graduation from Grant MacEwan, he accepted employment with Native Counseling Services of Alberta as a media assistant in the media department. During this time, he did some narration work for Native Counseling Services, ACCESS radio, and the National Film Board.

A small part in a CBC Television pilot program called John Cat, based on a W. P. Kinsella book, sparked Herman's interest in acting, and he decided to leave his position at Native Counseling Services to pursue a career in the performing arts. In April 1989, a Los Angeles casting agent chose him for a part in Dances With Wolves. His role in the film was a Sioux warrior named Stone Calf.

He went on to perform numerous roles in feature films and television series in Canada and the United States, including an extra in the Academy Award-winning Western Unforgiven, the television film Crazy Horse, The X-Files, and a six-year stint on CBC's North of 60, portraying fur trapper Joe Gomba. In 2005, the Dreamspeakers Film Festival Society in Edmonton honoured him with a place on the Aboriginal Walk of Fame.

Herman spoke to Aboriginal youth in schools and at special events. He also turned towards political activism, seeking diplomatic solutions and bringing his voice to the debate surrounding Aboriginal treaty rights. Herman worked to better Treaty 6 communities.

== Filmography ==
Year	Title	Role	Notes
1990	Dances with Wolves	Stone Calf	
1992	Unforgiven	Train Person #2	Uncredited
1993	Geronimo	Old Geronimo	TV movie
1993	Medicine River	Lionel James	TV movie
1994	Blind Justice	Shaman	TV movie
1994	Road to Saddle River		
1994	Warrior Spirit	Mukoki	TV movie
1994	The X-Files	Ish	Episode: "Shapes"
1995	Tecumseh: The Last Warrior	Cornstalk	TV movie
1996	Crazy Horse	Conquering Bear	TV movie
1996	Lonesome Dove: The Outlaw Years	Little Wolf	Episode: Medicine
1997	North of 60	Joe Gomba	
1998	Gunslinger's Revenge	Indian Grandfather	
1999	Phantom Town	Attendant	
1999	In the Blue Ground	Joe Gomba	
1999	Grey Owl	Chief Pete Misebi	
2000	Reindeer Games	The Bartender	
2000	The Claim	Third Miner	
2001	Death Train to the Pacific		TV movie
2003	Boys on the Run	Walter Running Deer	
2003	Dreamkeeper	Multnomah Elder	TV movie
2003	Coyote Waits	Ashie Pinto	
2003	Michel Vaillant	The Indian chief	
2005	Hank Williams First Nation	Uncle Martin	
2005	Little House on the Prairie	Osage	TV mini-series
2005	Santa's Slay	Vinny	
2005	Supernatural	Joe Whitetree	Episode: "Bugs"
2007	Bury My Heart at Wounded Knee	Yellow Bird	TV movie, (final film role)
