= Michael Greyeyes =

Canadian actor (born 1967)

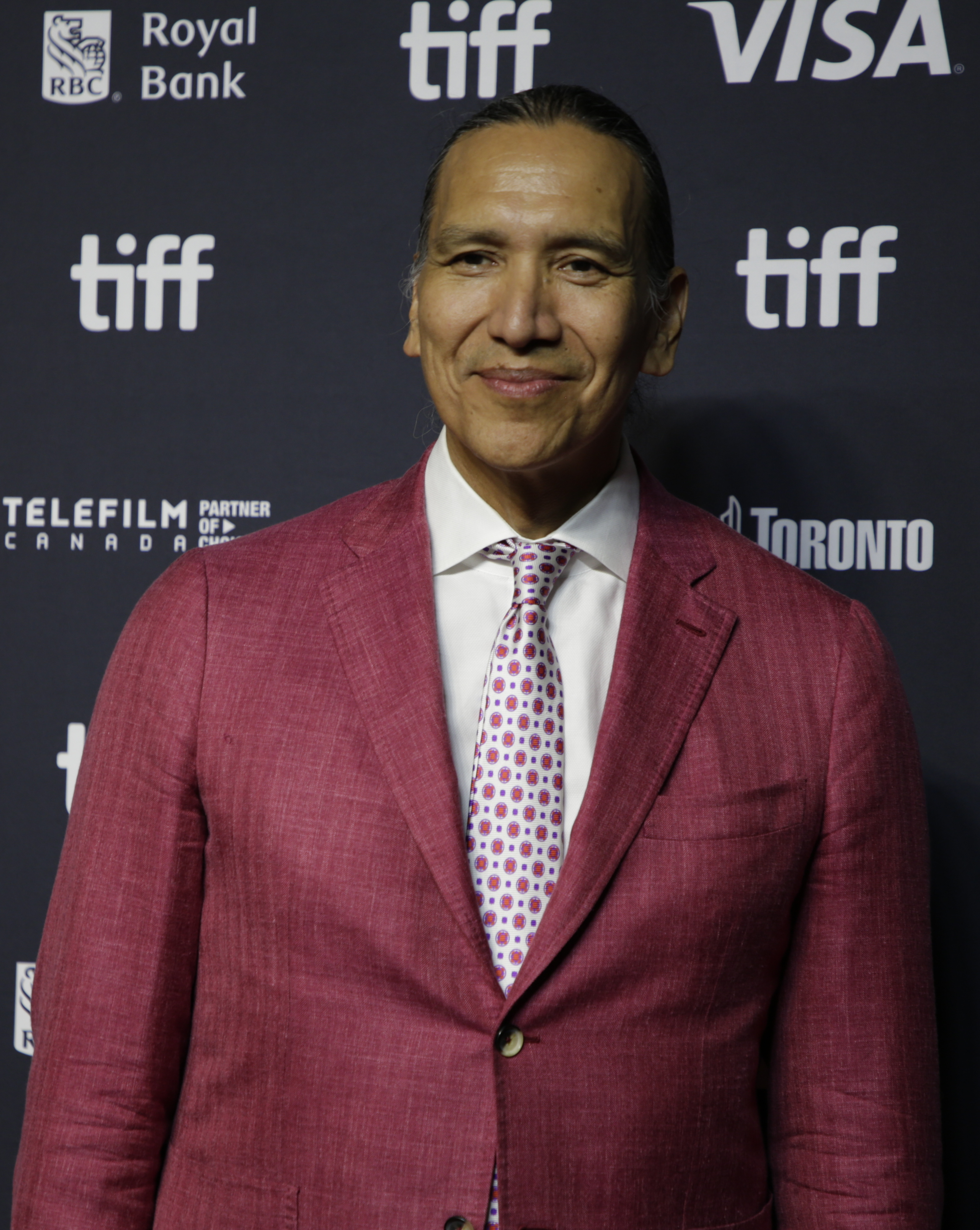
- Greyeyes at the 2025 Toronto International Film Festival
- Born: Michael Joseph Charles Greyeyes; June 4, 1967 (age 59); Qu'Appelle Valley, Saskatchewan, Canada
- Occupations: Actor, dancer, choreographer and director
- Spouse: Nancy Latoszewski
- Children: 2

Michael Greyeyes (born June 4, 1967) is a Canadian First Nations (Muskeg Lake Cree Nation) actor, dancer, choreographer, director, and educator.

In 1996, Greyeyes portrayed Crazy Horse in the television film Crazy Horse. In 2018, Greyeyes portrayed Sitting Bull in Woman Walks Ahead to critical acclaim. He has also had TV roles on Fear the Walking Dead, True Detective and I Know This Much Is True. In 2021–2022, he had a main role in the Peacock sitcom Rutherford Falls. He had a recurring role in the first season of the Paramount+ western series 1923. He won the Canadian Screen Award for Best Actor at the 9th Canadian Screen Awards in 2021, for his performance in the zombie film Blood Quantum.

== Life and career ==
Born in Saskatchewan, Greyeyes is Plains Cree from the Muskeg Lake First Nation. His father was from the Muskeg Lake First Nation and his mother was from the Sweetgrass First Nation, both located in Saskatchewan. Greyeyes started his performance career as a dancer. He is a graduate of The National Ballet School in 1984. He became an apprentice with The National Ballet of Canada before joining the company as a Corps de Ballet member in 1987.

After three years, he moved to New York City in 1990 to join the company of modern dance choreographer Eliot Feld. Greyeyes performed in many of Feld's seminal works, including Intermezzo, Skara Brae, and The Jig is Up. He performed in roles created for him in such ballets as Common Ground and Bloom's Wake. After years of also working as an actor, Greyeyes later completed his master's degree in Fine Arts at the School of Theatre and Dance at Kent State University and graduated in May 2003.

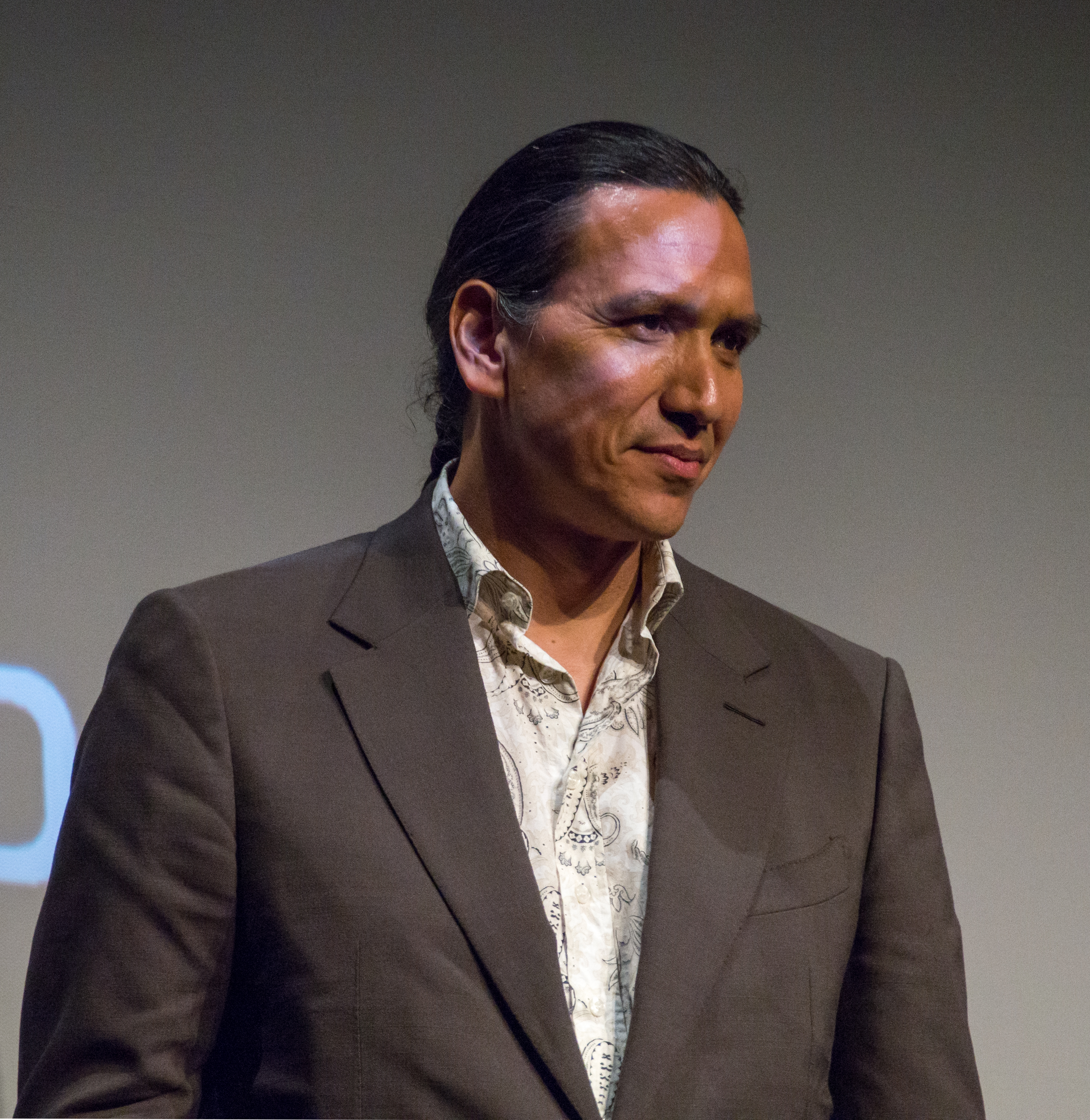
Greyeyes at the Tribeca Film Festival in 2018 for Woman Walks Ahead

Greyeyes began his acting career in 1993, when he was cast as Juh in TNT's Geronimo. This role led to numerous television appearances, including guest-starring performances in Law & Order: Criminal Intent, Walker, Texas Ranger, Numb3rs, Dr. Quinn, Medicine Woman, and Millennium. In 1998 he starred in Stolen Women, Captured Hearts, with Janine Turner and Patrick Bergen. He is featured in the mini-series Klondike, Dreamkeeper, Rough Riders, Big Bear, and True Women.

His films include: Dance Me Outside, Smoke Signals, Sunshine State, Skipped Parts, Skinwalkers (based on the book by Tony Hillerman), and Woman Walks Ahead (2017), in which he played Chief Sitting Bull opposite Jessica Chastain as a portrait painter.

Greyeyes also continued his dance research on the modern form of traditional dancing, powwow. His journey of exploration was documented in He Who Dreams: Michael on the Powwow Trail for CBC Television by Adrienne Clarkson. He choreographed and performed in Rebecca Belmore's durational performance art work Gone Indian for Toronto's Nuit Blanche.

Greyeyes continues to act and dance regularly. His more recent works include The New World directed by Terrence Malick, Tecumseh's Vision, a PBS documentary/live action drama, Passchendaele, which opened the 2008 Toronto International Film Festival, and Triptych (a short film broadcast nationally on Bravo! Television).

Untitled #1535 is a site-specific dance work he choreographed for Dusk Dances. The Journey (Pimooteewin) is an opera he directed with music by Melissa Hui and libretto by Tomson Highway.

He did the voice of protagonist Tommy Tawodi in the 2006 action game Prey. He played a recurring role on Fear The Walking Dead (2017).

In 2010, Greyeyes founded Signal Theatre, a company that explores intercultural and transdisciplinary live performance. As artistic director and choreographer, he has overseen the creation of three major works, including From thine eyes (Harbourfront Centre), Nôhkom (The Banff Centre), and A Soldier's Tale (Fleck Dance Theatre), a work examining the aftermath of war upon soldiers and their families. He has said that he "was not interested in staging ethnicity." A Soldier's Tale was co-produced by The National Arts Centre and The Canada Dance Festival and opened the 2014 Canada Dance Festival in Ottawa at the NAC Theatre. Signal Theater has also produced installations and performance art works, such as Winter Home, which premiered in Saskatoon, Saskatchewan.

Greyeyes won the Canadian Screen Award for Best Actor at the 9th Canadian Screen Awards in 2021, for his performance in the zombie film Blood Quantum. He has played the main role of Terry Thomas, CEO of a fictional tribe's casino on the Peacock TV series Rutherford Falls (2021-2022).

In 2021 Greyeyes was signed to a first look deal with Blumhouse Productions. Greyeyes appears as John Rainbird in the 2022 film Firestarter, based on the Stephen King novel of the same name.

In 2023 he participated as one of the panelists in Canada Reads, championing Emily St. John Mandel's novel Station Eleven.

He has directed episodes of the television series Acting Good. In 2024 his first short film, The Light Before the Sun, premiered at the Hamilton Film Festival.

== Personal life ==
Greyeyes is an associate professor of theatre at York University. He is married to Nancy Latoszewski. They have two children, Micah and Lilia, born in 2002 and 2004.

== Filmography ==
=== Film ===
Year	Title	Role	Notes
1994	Dance Me Outside	Gooch	
1995	Rude	Spirit Dancer	
1996	A Nation Is Coming	Ghost Dancer	Short
1998	Firestorm	Andy	
1998	Smoke Signals	Junior Polatkin	
1998	The Minion	Grey Eagle	
1998	A League of Old Men	Red Cloud	
2000	Skipped Parts	Hank Elkrunner	
2002	ZigZag	Dale	
2002	Sunshine State	Billy Trucks	
2004	The Reawakening	Robert Doctor	
2005	The New World	Rupwew	
2007	Cosmic Radio	-	
2008	Passchendaele	Highway	
2008	The Dreaming	Spirit	Short
2009	Kissed by Lightning	Jessie Lightning	
2013	Jimmy P: Psychotherapy of a Plains Indian	Allan	
2017	Woman Walks Ahead	Sitting Bull	
2019	Blood Quantum	Traylor	
2019	Togo	Amituk	
2021	Wild Indian	Makwa ("Michael Peterson")	
2021	Wildhood	Smokey	
2022	Firestarter	John Rainbird	
2023	The King Tide	Marlon	
2024	40 Acres	Galen	
2025	Meadowlarks	Anthony	
2026	Someone's Daughter	Kent	

=== Television ===
Year	Title	Role	Notes
1993	Geronimo	Juh	TV movie
1995	Are You Afraid of the Dark?	The Shaman	Episode: "The Tale of the Manaha"
1996	Crazy Horse	Crazy Horse	TV movie
1997	Stolen Women, Captured Hearts	Tokalah	TV movie
1997	Promised Land	Rod	Episode: "The Outrage"
1997	Dr. Quinn, Medicine Woman	Walks In The Night	Episode: "Moment of Truth Part 1 & 2"
1997	True Women	Tarantula	Main cast
1997	Rough Riders	Delchaney (Apache)	Episode: "Episode #1.1 & #1.2"
1997	Millennium	Joe Reynard	Episode: "A Single Blade of Grass"
1998	The Magnificent Seven	Imala	Episode: "Ghosts of the Confederacy"
1998	Big Bear	Wandering Spirit	Episode: "Episode #1.1 & #1.2"
1999	Walker, Texas Ranger	Brian Falcon	Episode: "Team Cherokee: Part 1 & 2"
2000	Harsh Realm	The Brave	Episode: "Cincinnati"
2000	Race Against Time	Johnny Black Eagle	TV movie
2000	The Lost Child	Eddie	TV movie
2001	Sam's Circus	Chief	TV movie
2001	Charmed	Bo Lightfeather	Episode: "The Good, the Bad and the Cursed"
2001	MythQuest	Strong Bear	Episode: "Red Wolf's Daughter"
2002	Body & Soul	Detective Cornstalk	Episode: "Graveyard Shift"
2002	Skinwalkers: The Navajo Mysteries	Dr. Stone	Episode: "Skinwalkers"
2002	Skinwalkers	Dr. Stone	TV movie
2003	Dreamkeeper	Thunder Spirit	TV movie
2004	The Jury	Ty Sawyer	Episode: "Lamentation on the Reservation"
2005	Law & Order: Criminal Intent	Sonny Brightbill	Episode: "Gone"
2005	Numb3rs	Thomas Morris	Episode: "Bones of Contention"
2007	Dancing with Spirit	Lead Dancer	Episode: "Triptych"
2009	American Experience	Tecumseh	Episode: "We Shall Remain Part II: Tecumseh's Vision"
2014	Klondike	Cheyeho	Recurring cast
2015	Saints & Strangers	Canonicus	Episode: "Episode #1.1 & #1.2"
2017	Fear the Walking Dead	Qaletaqa Walker	Recurring cast (season 3)
2017	American Gods	Pit Boss	Episode: "Git Gone"
2019	True Detective	Brett Woodard	Recurring cast (season 3)
2019	V Wars	Jimmy Saint	Main cast
2020	I Know This Much Is True	Ralph Drinkwater	Main cast
2020–21	Home Before Dark	Sam Gillis	Recurring cast (season 1), guest (season 2)
2021	Star Trek: Discovery	Felix	Episode: "The Examples"
2021–22	Rutherford Falls	Terry Thomas	Main cast
2022–2023	Acting Good	cousin Leon	S01E01, Just Fok'n Missing Her - S01E04, High Rollers - S02E10, A Man for All Shack-Up Seasons
2022–2025	1923	Hank	Episode: "Ghost of Zebrina", “One Ocean Closer to Destiny”, “The Rule of Five Hundred”, “Nothing Left to Lose”
2024	Spirit Rangers	'Eleyewun	Episode: "Finding True North/The Great Swordfish", "Summer's in Charge/Barracuda Brouhaha"
2025	The Abandons	Jack Cree	Recurring cast

=== Video games ===
Year	Title	Role	Notes
2006	Prey	Domasi Tawodi (Tommy)/Hiders #1/Abducted #2/Radio Caller #1	

== Awards and nominations ==
Year	Awards	Category	Recipient	Outcome
2018	Saturn Awards	Saturn Award for Best Guest Performance in a Television Series	Fear the Walking Dead	Nominated
2021	Canadian Screen Awards	Canadian Screen Award for Performance by an Actor in a Leading Role	Blood Quantum	Won
2021	Gotham Independent Film Awards	Outstanding Performance in a New Series	Rutherford Falls	Nominated
2021	Gotham Independent Film Awards	Outstanding Lead Performance	Wild Indian	Nominated
2022	Independent Spirit Awards	Best Male Performance in a New Scripted Series	Rutherford Falls	Nominated
2022	Independent Spirit Awards	Best Male Lead	Wild Indian	Nominated
