= Crazy Horse (1996 film) =

- VHS cover art
- Genre: Western
- Written by: Robert Schenkkan
- Directed by: John Irvin
- Starring: Michael Greyeyes; Irene Bedard; Jimmy Herman; August Schellenberg; Ned Beatty; Peter Horton; Wes Studi
- Music by: Lennie Niehaus
- Country of origin: United States
- Original language: English

Production
- Executive producers: Robert M. Sertner; Frank von Zerneck
- Producers: Salli Newman; Cleve Landsberg; Hanay Geiogamah; Randy Sutter; Stacy Mandelberg
- Cinematography: Thomas Burstyn
- Editor: Mark Conte
- Running time: 90 minutes
- Production company: Von Zerneck-Sertner Films

Original release
- Network: TNT
- Release: July 7, 1996

Crazy Horse is a 1996 American Western television film based on the true story of Crazy Horse, a Native American war leader of the Oglala Lakota, and the Battle of Little Bighorn. It was shown on TNT as part of a series of five "historically accurate telepics" about Native American history.

The film is directed by John Irvin and stars Michael Greyeyes as Crazy Horse. Ned Beatty stars as Dr. McGillicuddy, Irene Bedard as Black Buffalo Woman, Wes Studi as Red Cloud and Peter Horton as George Armstrong Custer.

Other First Nation stars include Jimmy Herman as Conquering Bear, August Schellenberg as Sitting Bull, Gordon Tootoosis as Akicita and Lorne Cardinal as Young Man Afraid.

It was shot in Black Hills, South Dakota.

== Cast ==
- Michael Greyeyes as Crazy Horse
- Irene Bedard as Black Buffalo Woman
- Ned Beatty as Dr. Valentine McGillicuddy
- Peter Horton as George Armstrong Custer
- Jimmy Herman as Conquering Bear
- Gordon Tootoosis as Akicita
- Lorne Cardinal as Young Man Afraid of His Horses
- August Schellenberg as Sitting Bull
- Wes Studi as Red Cloud
- Daniel Studi as Wasu
- Scott Means as No Water
- Larry Sellers as Spotted Tail
