= Tecumseh: The Last Warrior =

- Genre: Action; Biography; Drama
- Written by: James Alexander Thom, Paul F. Edwards
- Directed by: Larry Elikann
- Starring: Tantoo Cardinal; Lorne Cardinal; Jimmy Herman; Crystle Lightning; Holt McCallany; David Morse
- Music by: David Shire
- Country of origin: United States
- Original language: English

Production
- Executive producers: Francis Ford Coppola; Fred Fuchs; Robert M. Sertner
- Producers: Hanay Geiogamah; Lynn Raynor
- Production location: Winston-Salem, North Carolina
- Cinematography: Eric van Haren Noman
- Editor: Peter V. White
- Running time: 92 min.

Original release
- Network: TNT
- Release: October 14, 1995

Tecumseh: The Last Warrior is a 1995 American Western television film based on the true story of Tecumseh, a Native American war leader of the Shawnee, and Tecumseh's War.

The film was directed by Larry Elikann and stars Jesse Borrego as Tecumseh. It is based on James Alexander Thom's 1989 novel Panther in the Sky. It was shot in Winston-Salem, North Carolina.

== Plot ==
In the year 1812, the English and white American settlers try to seize territories from the Native people. Tecumseh, who is the leader of the Shawnee, tries to do defend his people. He plans to create an independent state for the Native Americans and tries to convince the settlers to accept this plan.

== Cast ==
- Jesse Borrego as Tecumseh
- Tantoo Cardinal as Turtle Mother
- Lorne Cardinal as Loud Noise
- Jeri Arredondo as Star Watcher
- Keith Flippen as British Officer
- Jimmy Herman as Cornstalk
- Mike Kanentakeron as Change of Feathers
- Crystle Lightning as Star Watcher
- Holt McCallany as Blue Jacket
- David Clennon as William Henry Harrison
- Gregory Cruz as Chiksika
- Tailinh Agoyo as She Is Favored
- David Morse as Galloway
