= Tantoo Cardinal =

Canadian actress (born 1950)

Tantoo Cardinal CM
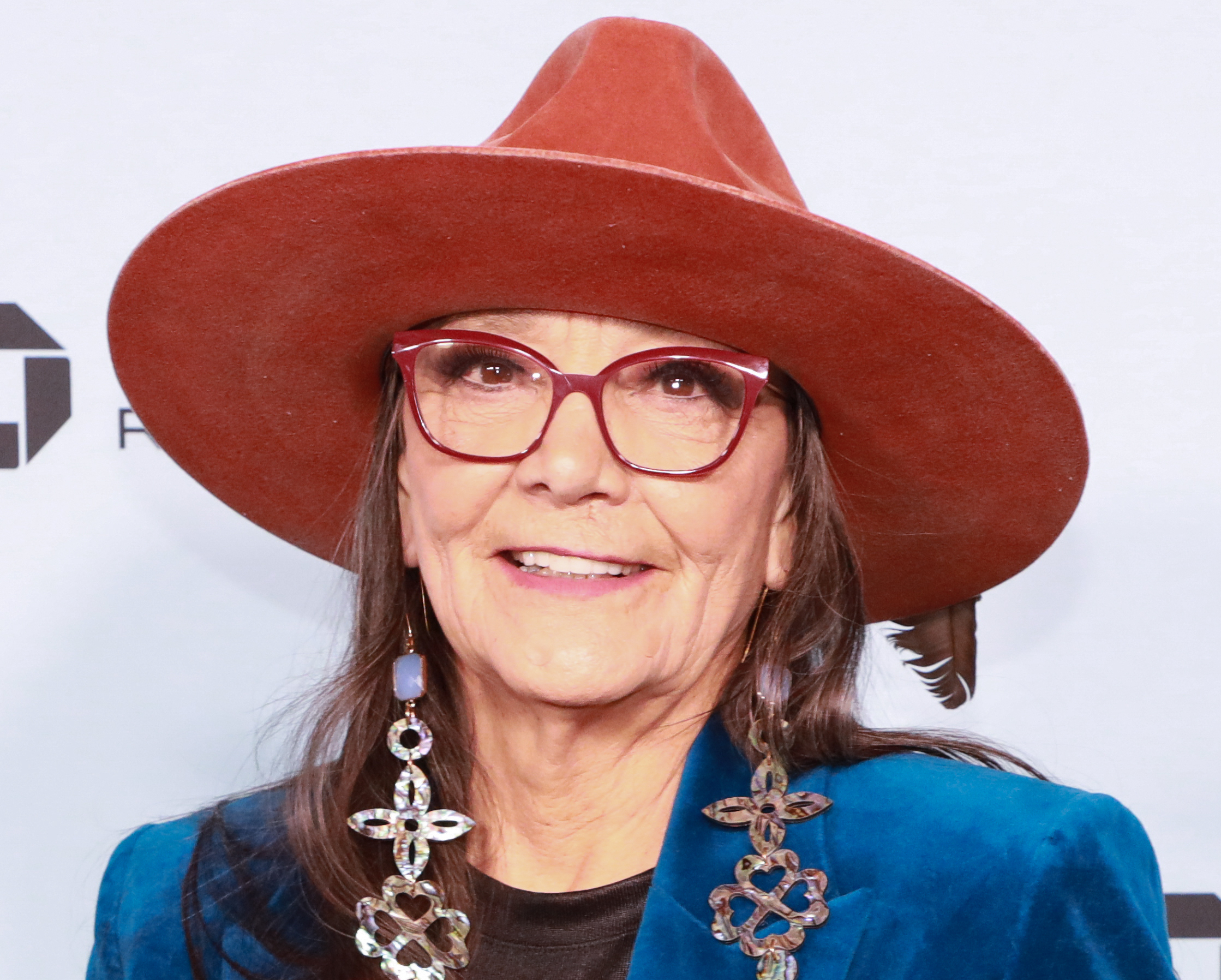
- Cardinal in 2025
- Born: Tantoo Rose Marie Cardinal; July 20, 1950 (age 76); Anzac, Alberta, Canada
- Occupation: Actress
- Years active: 1975–present
- Children: Three, including Cliff Cardinal

Tantoo Cardinal (born July 20, 1950) is a Canadian actress of Cree and Métis heritage. In 2009 she was made a member of the Order of Canada "for her contributions to the growth and development of Aboriginal performing arts in Canada, as a screen and stage actress, and as a founding member of the Saskatchewan Native Theatre Company."

== Early life ==
Tantoo Cardinal was born the youngest of three children to Julia Cardinal, a woman of Cree and Métis descent, and a white father.

Cardinal was raised in the hamlet of Anzac, Alberta. The lack of electricity inspired her to use her imagination while playing in the bush. Her grandmother nicknamed her "Tantoo" after the insect repellent they used while picking blueberries together. She taught Cardinal the Cree language, the traditional ways of their culture and the difficulties she would face growing up Métis in Canada. Cardinal has said that it was walking behind her grandmother where she first learned to act.

== Career ==
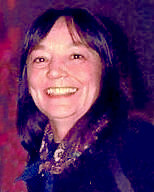
Cardinal in 2001

Cardinal has played roles in many notable films and television series, including Spirit Bay, Loyalties, Dances with Wolves, Black Robe, Legends of the Fall, Smoke Signals, Hold the Dark, Where the Rivers Flow North opposite Rip Torn, and North of 60. She was cast in the Canadian Broadcasting Corporation mini-series By Way of the Stars with Gordon Tootoosis as the Cree Chief and Eric Schweig as Black Thunder.

In 2009, she was made a member of the Order of Canada "for her contributions to the growth and development of Aboriginal performing arts in Canada, as a screen and stage actress, and as a founding member of the Saskatchewan Native Theatre Company".

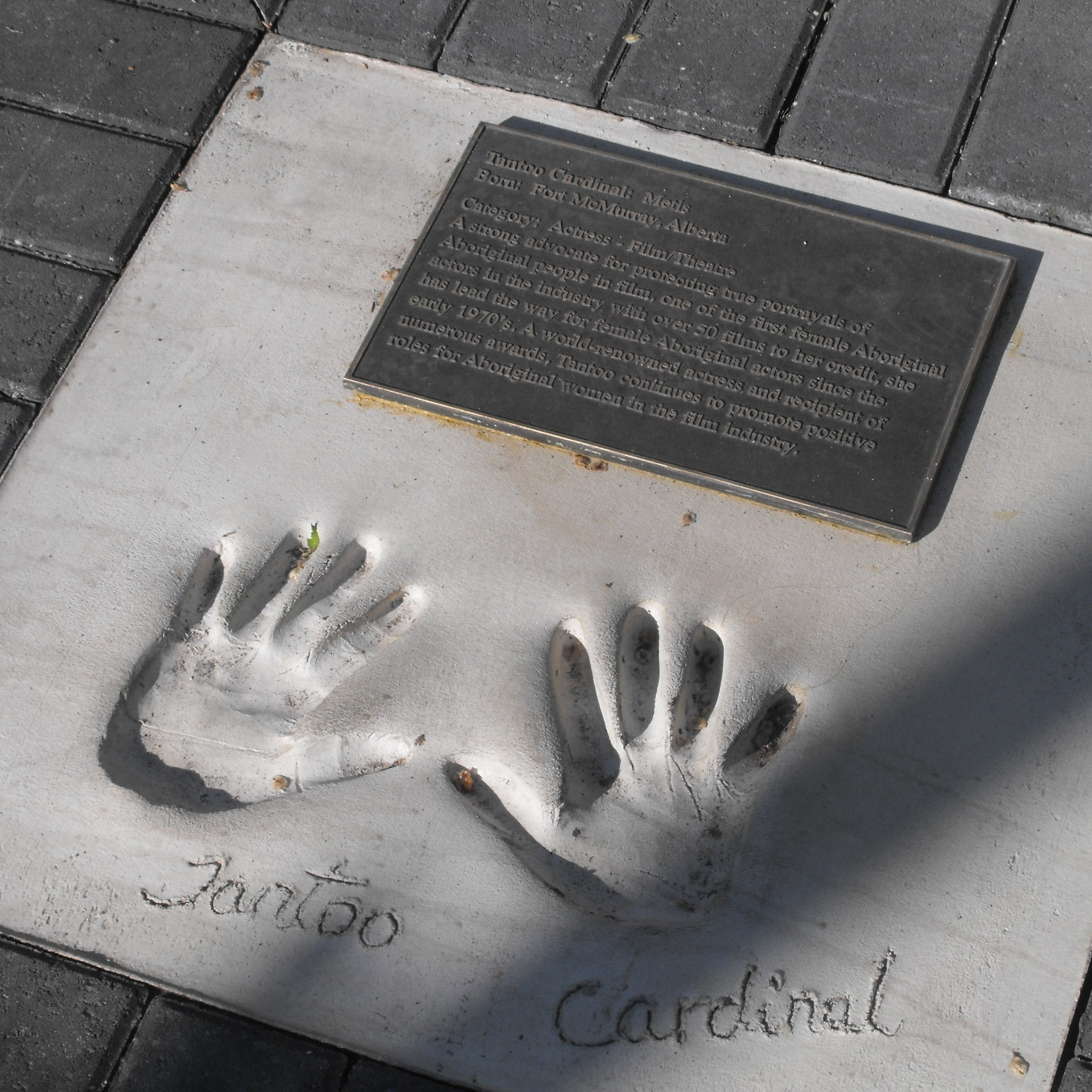
Cardinal's Hand print on the Aboriginal Walk of Honour in Canada

On August 23, 2011, Cardinal, Margot Kidder, and dozens of others were arrested while protesting the proposed extension of the Keystone Pipeline.

In 2012, Cardinal portrayed Regan in an all-aboriginal production of William Shakespeare's King Lear at the National Arts Centre in Ottawa. The production was helmed by Order of Canada member Peter Hinton-Davis and included August Schellenberg as Lear, Billy Merasty as Gloucester, Jani Lauzon in a dual role as Cordelia and the Fool, and Craig Lauzon as Kent.

She played Marilyn Yarlott for three seasons as a recurring cast member in the Netflix series Longmire, a Crow hunter and medicine woman who lives alone in the vast wilderness of the Crow reservation.

In 2017 she was named the winner of the Academy of Canadian Cinema and Television's Earle Grey Award for lifetime achievement. She has also won a Gemini Award, a National Aboriginal Achievement Award (now Indspire Award) and was inducted into Canada's Walk of Fame.

In the 2018 film The Grizzlies, she plays a high school principal who is skeptical that a first-time teacher can address social issues in the northwestern Nunavut community of Kugluktuk.

On November 26, 2021, Cardinal and several other laureates received the Governor General's Performing Arts Awards after a nearly two-year delay due to the COVID-19 pandemic. Her portrait, taken by mixed-media artist HAUI, is displayed at Rideau Hall.

In 2023, Cardinal was inducted into Canada's Walk of Fame.

== Personal life ==
Cardinal met her first husband, Fred Martin, while boarding at his family's home during her high school years in Edmonton. They were married from 1968 to 1978 and had a son, prior to their divorce.

She had her second son, Clifford, with Beaver Richards.

From 1988 to 2000, Cardinal was married to actor John Lawlor, with whom she had a daughter.

== Filmography ==
Key
†	Denotes works that have not yet been released

=== Film ===
Year	Title	Role	Notes
1978	Marie-Anne	Tantou	
1981	Death Hunt	Indian Woman	
1983	Running Brave	Caroline	
1986	Places Not Our Own	Rose	
1986	Loyalties	Rosanne Ladouceur	Nominated – Genie Award for Best Actress
1987	Candy Mountain	Annie	
1988	War Party	Sonny's mother	
1990	Divided Loyalties	Molly Brant	
1990	Dances With Wolves	Black Shawl	
1991	Black Robe	Chomina's Wife	
1993	Silent Tongue	Silent Tongue	
1993	Where the Rivers Flow North	Bangor	
1993	Mustard Bath	Sister Amantha	
1994	Sioux City	Dawn Rainfeather	
1994	Legends of the Fall	Pet Decker	
1997	The Education of Little Tree	Granma	
1997	Silence	Dolores	
1998	Honey Moccasin	Honey Moccasin	
1998	Smoke Signals	Arlene Joseph	
1998	Heartwood	Violet Boucher	
1999	The Hi-Line	Singing Bird	
1999	A Stranger in the Kingdom	Heaven Fontaine	
2000	Postmark Paradise	Reenie	
2000	Blood River	Claire / Mattie	Short
2002	Edge of Madness	Ruth	
2004	Memory	Ida	Short
2006	Unnatural & Accidental	Aunt Shadie / Rita	
2008	Older than America	Auntie Apple	
2008	Ancestor Eyes	Verna	Short
2008	Mothers & Daughters	Celine	
2010	Every Emotion Costs	Aunt Marcy	
2011	Shouting Secrets	June	
2012	Eden	The Nurse	
2013	From Above	Older Venus	
2013	Maïna	Tekahera	
2014	Down Here	Stella Mitchell	
2015	Hope Bridge	Lana	
2016	ARQ	The Pope	
2017	Wind River	Alice Crowheart	
2018	Falls Around Her	Mary Birchbark	
2018	The Grizzlies	Janice	
2018	Through Black Spruce	Mary-Lou	
2018	Hold the Dark	Illanaq	
2018	Angelique's Isle	Thunderbird Woman	
2019	Red Snow	Ruth	
2020	The Corruption of Divine Providence	Juniper Fairweather	
2022	Wendell & Wild	Miss Hunter (voice)	
2022	The Last Manhunt	Ticup	
2023	Killers of the Flower Moon	Lizzie Q	Nominated – Screen Actors Guild Award for Outstanding Performance by a Cast in a Motion Picture
2024	Inkwo for When the Starving Return	Auntie	Short
2026	Wildwood	Iphigenia (voice)	

=== Television ===
Year	Title	Role	Notes
1981	SCTV	Extra	Episode 4/2-2 "Power Play"
1984	Spirit Bay	Annie	Main role
1987	Gunsmoke: Return to Dodge	Little Doe	Television film
1990	The Campbells	Maria Brant	Episode: "Miles to Go"
1991	Lightning Field	Vivian	Television film
1992	Street Legal	Renee Stonehouse	Recurring role; 4 episodes
1992–93	By Way of the Stars	Franois	Television mini-series
1993	Harts of the West	Helen	Episode: "Auggie's End"
1993	Spirit Rider	Marilyn St. Claire	Television film
1993–95	Dr. Quinn, Medicine Woman	Snow Bird	Recurring role; 7 episodes
1994–97	North of 60	Betty Moses	Recurring role; 7 episodes
1995	500 Nations	(voice)	Television mini-series
1995	Tecumseh: The Last Warrior	Turtle Mother	Television film
1996	Grand Avenue	Nellie	Television film
1998	Big Bear	Running Second	Television mini-series
1998	Cold Squad	Theresa Sandiman	Episode: "Salty Cheever"
2000	Navigating the Heart	Mary	Television film
2000	The Lost Child	Aunt Mary	Television film
2001	MythQuest	Walloha	Episode: "Red Wolf's Daughter"
2002	Tom Stone	Judge Crowfoot	Episode: "Royalty"
2003–06	Moccasin Flats	Betty Merasty	Recurring role; 22 episodes
2004	Windy Acres	Aunt Laura	Recurring role; 7 episodes
2004	H_{2}O	Grand Chief Katie Blackfire	Guest role; 2 episodes
2004	A Thief of Time	Irene Musket	Television film
2006	Indian Summer: The Oka Crisis	Iba Beauvais	4 episodes
2007	Luna: Spirit of the Whale	Gloria Maquinna	Television film
2008	The Guard	Ursula	Recurring role; 4 episodes
2008	Just Breathe	Heather	Television film
2008	Changing Climates, Changing Times	Grace Lajoie	Television film
2009	Tales of an Urban Indian	Dianne	Television film
2009	Dear Prudence	Ruth Vigil	Television film
2010	Shattered	Carol	Guest role; 2 episodes
2012	The Killing	Prostitute	Episode: "Keylela"
2012–15	Blackstone	Wilma Stoney	Recurring role; 18 episodes
2013	Arctic Air	Aunt Mary	Episode: "Skeletons in the Closet"
2014	Strange Empire	Pichette	Episode: "Lonely Hearts"
2014–16	Mohawk Girls	Zoe's Mom	Recurring role; 5 episodes
2015–17	Longmire	Marilyn Yarlott	Guest role; 4 episodes
2016	Frontier	Kamenna	Guest role; 2 episodes
2016	On the Farm	Ada Taylor	Television film
2017	The Great Northern Candy Drop	Louisa (voice)	Television film
2017	Godless	Iyovi	Miniseries; 7 episodes
2018	Outlander	Adawehi	Guest role; 2 episodes
2019	See	The Dreamer	Guest role; 4 episodes
2019–20	Stumptown	Sue Lynn Blackbird	Series regular
2021	New Amsterdam	Dr. Jane Munsee	Episode: "Radical"
2021	Corner Gas Animated	Julie Rouleau (voice)	Episode: "A Lot to be Desired"
2022–23	Spirit Rangers	Moon (voice)	Recurring role
2022	Oni: Thunder God's Tale	Principal (voice)	3 episodes
2022	Three Pines	Bea Mayer	Series regular
2023	The Boss Baby: Back in the Crib	Marie Chalifoux (voice)	Episode: "North of the Border"
2024	Echo	Chula	Series regular
2025	The American Revolution	(voice)	2 episodes
2025	The Wingfeather Saga	Onwaa (voice)	3 episodes
TBA	Avatar: The Last Airbender	Hama	Upcoming role
TBA	The X-Files		Upcoming role

=== Audiobooks ===
Year	Title	Role	Notes
2000	Island of the Blue Dolphins	Narrator	
2019	The Testaments	Scholar	
2019	Islands of Decolonial Love: Stories and Songs	Narrator	By Leanne Betasamosake Simpson

=== Music videos ===
Year	Title	Role	Artist
2019	"Mehcinut"		Jeremy Dutcher

== See also ==
- Notable Aboriginal people of Canada
