= The Trail of Tears: Cherokee Legacy =

2006 documentary film

The Trail of Tears: Cherokee Legacy is a 2006 documentary by Rich-Heape Films. It presents the history of the forcible removal and relocation of Cherokee people from southeastern states of the United States to territories west of the Mississippi River, particularly to the Indian Territory in the future Oklahoma.

== Historical context ==
This removal in the 1830s has been popularly referred to as the "Trail of Tears." It followed the Indian Removal Act of 1830. This action was part of a larger United States policy of Indian removal.

== Appearances ==
Actor Wes Studi as on-camera presenter James Earl Jones narrated the film. Other celebrities providing voices for the film include James Garner, Crystal Gayle, and Wilma Mankiller. Native American and other history professors make on-camera narrative observations. The film includes speech in the Cherokee language.

== Details ==
- MPAA rating: none
- Running time: 115 minutes

== Awards received ==
- 2007 Silver World Medal for History, New York Film Festival
- 2008 Best Documentary, American Indian Film Festival

== See also ==
- Cherokee
- Five Civilized Tribes
- Indian removal
- Andrew Jackson
- Trail of Tears
