= Shawn Williamson =

Canadian film and television producer

Shawn Williamson (born April 26, 1965) is a Canadian film and television producer based in Vancouver, British Columbia, Canada.

== Early life ==
Williamson was born in Vancouver, British Columbia, Canada. Shawn began his career as a stage manager at The Arts Club Theatre in 1983 and has since produced live events, live television and television series, as well as feature films.

== Career ==
Shawn Williamson is an Emmy-nominated producer and founder of Brightlight Pictures, a film and television production company based out of Vancouver, British Columbia that develops, packages, and produces independent feature films and television projects. Since launching in 2001, Williamson has produced more than 250 film and television series, from White Noise with Michael Keaton, and 50 Dead Men Walking starring Jim Sturgess and Ben Kingsley to Nacho Vigalondo’s Colossal starring Anne Hathaway, critically-acclaimed Summer of '84, and Disney’s Descendants films.

Williamson’s current productions include an array of critically-acclaimed film and television projects, including Lionsgate’s Float starring Robbie Amell, Nickelodeon’s Monster High: The Movie, Netflix’s “Firefly Lane”, Amazon Prime Video’s “Upload” and “The Power” with Toni Collette, Auli'i Cravalho, and John Leguizamo, AMC’s “Lucky Hank” with Bob Odenkirk, and the renowned drama series “The Good Doctor” for ABC and Sony Pictures Television, which was named the most watched television series in the world at the Monte Carlo TV Festival in 2018.

A highly sought-after executive producer, Williamson’s other noteworthy credits include: The Interview starring Seth Rogen and James Franco for Columbia Pictures; Horns starring Daniel Radcliffe, produced in conjunction with Mandalay Pictures; and Netflix’s “Julie and the Phantoms,” for which he was nominated for an Emmy. He also served as a producer on The Company You Keep with Robert Redford and Shia LaBeouf, 50/50 starring Joseph Gordon-Levitt and Seth Rogen, The Possession starring Jeffrey Dean Morgan and Kyra Sedgwick, Passengers with Anne Hathaway, and The Wicker Man starring Nicolas Cage.

With more than 25 years at the forefront of the film and television industry, the Vancouver native began his career as a stage manager at The Arts Club Theatre in 1983 and, in addition to feature films, has since produced live events, live television and unscripted series across the globe, including Singapore, Croatia, Romania, France, England, Northern Ireland, South Africa and Australia.

== Filmography ==
=== Films ===
- Borderline
- Float
- It Lives Inside (2023)
- Every Breath You Take (2021) (2021)
- 2 Hearts (2020)
- Elsewhere (2019)
- Summer of 84(2018)
- The Package (2018)
- Status Update (2018)
- Scorched Earth (2018)
- 1922 (2017)
- Colossal (2016)
- Un-Break My Heart (2016)
- This Is Your Death (2016)
- Little Pink House (2016)
- The 9th Life of Louis Drax (2016)
- Life on the Line (2015)
- The Unspoken (2015)
- The Interview (2014)
- Leap 4 Your Life (2013)
- Horns (2013)
- Assault on Wall Street (2013)
- The Package (2012)
- The Company You Keep (2012)
- The Possession (2012)
- In the Name of the King: Two Worlds (2011)
- 50/50 (2011)
- Apollo 18 (2011)
- Max Schmeling (2010)
- Frankie & Alice (2010)
- Gunless (2010)
- The Final Storm (2010)
- Attack on Darfur (2009)
- The Thaw (2009)
- Rampage (2009)
- Stoic (2009)
- Possession (2008)
- Far Cry (2008)
- Passengers (2008)
- Fifty Dead Men Walking (2008)
- 1968 Tunnel Rats (2008)
- Normal (2007)
- American Venus (2007)
- They Wait (2007)
- Postal (2007)
- Whisper (2007)
- In the Name of the King: A Dungeon Siege Tale (2007)
- 88 Minutes (2007)
- White Noise 2: The Light (2007)
- Seed (2006)
- Wicker Man (2006)
- Slither (2006)
- BloodRayne (2005)
- Severed (2005)
- The Long Weekend (2005)
- Edison (2005)
- Alone in the Dark (2005)
- White Noise (2005)
- Pink Ludoos (2004)
- Jiminy Glick in Lalawood (2004)
- Going the Distance (2004)
- Lies Like Truth (2004)
- House of the Dead (2003)
- It's All About Love (2003)
- Punch (2002)
- Try Seventeen (2002)
- Heart of America (2002)
- Sea (2001)
- Blackwoods (2001)
- Finder's Fee (2001)
- Sanctimony (2000)
- Tail Lights Fade (1999)

=== Television ===
==== Television series ====
- Upload (TV series) (2020–2023)
- The Power (TV series) (2023)
- Lucky Hank (2023)
- Space Force (TV series) (2022)
- The Mighty Ducks: Game Changers (TV series) (2021)
- Firefly Lane (TV Series) (2021–2023)
- The Good Doctor (2017–2024)
- Julie and the Phantoms (TV Series) (2020)
- Upload (2020)
- 50 States of Fright (2020)
- Valley of the Boom (2019)
- The Murders (2019)
- Mystery 101 (TV series) (2019–2020)
- Haters Back Off (2016–2017)
- Timeless (2016)
- Wayward Pines (2016)
- Second Chance (2016)
- Aurora Teagarden Mysteries (TV Series) (2015–2021)
- Quest OutWest: Wild Food (2015–2020)
- Witches of East End (2013–2014)
- Rush (2014)
- Stormworld (2009)
- The Guard (2008–2009)
- About a Girl (2007–2008)
- Saved (2006)
- Alienated (2003–2004)
- Los Luchadores (2000–2001)
- Hollywood Off-Ramp (2000)
- The Charlie Horse Music Pizza (1998)
- Lamb Chop's Play-Along (1992)

==== Television films ====
- Monster High 2 (2023)
- 3 Bed, 2 Bath, 1 Ghost (2023)
- A Zest for Death: A Hannah Swensen Mystery (2023)
- The Wedding Contract (2023)
- Field Day (2023)
- Wedding Season (2023)
- Carrot Cake Murder: A Hannah Swensen Mystery (2023)
- The Professional Bridesmaid (2023)
- When Christmas was Young (2022)
- Christmas Class Reunion (2022)
- A Christmas Spark (2022)
- Three Wise Men and a Baby (2022)
- Lights, Camera, Christmas! (2022)
- A Magical Christmas Village (2022)
- Mid-Love Crisis (2022)
- Wedding of a Lifetime (2022)
- A Royal Runaway Romance (2022)
- Cruel Instructions (2022)
- Cut, Color, Murder (2022)
- Monster High: The Movie (2022)
- Under Wraps 2 (2022)
- Under Wraps (2021 film) (2021)
- Christmas for Keeps (2021)
- A Clüsterfünke Christmas (2021)
- Open by Christmas (2021)
- Gingerbread Miracle (2021)
- Christmas Sail (2021)
- Aurora Teagarden Mysteries: Honeymoon, Honeymurder (2021)
- Sweet Revenge: a Hannah Swensen Mystery (2021)
- Doomsday Mom (2021)
- Aurora Teagarden Mysteries: Til Death Do Us Part (2021)
- Don't Go Breaking My Heart (2021)
- Aurora Teagarden Mysteries: How to Con a Con (2021)
- Cross Country Christmas (2020)
- A Sugar & Spice Holiday (2020)
- A Glenbrooke Christmas (2020)
- Love, Lights, Hanukkah! (2020)
- Sleeping with Danger (2020)
- Poisoned Love: The Stacey Castor Story (2020)
- Hearts of Winter (2020)
- A Doggone Christmas (2019)
- It's Beginning to Look a Lot Like Christmas (2019)
- A Homecoming for the Holidays (2019)
- Christmas Unleashed (2019)
- Christmas Town (2019)
- A Very Vintage Christmas (2019)
- Descendants 3 (2019)
- Family Pictures (2019)
- To Have and to Hold (2019)
- Harry & Meghan: Becoming Royal (2019)
- Bottled with Love (2019)
- Victoria Gotti: My Father's Daughter (2019)
- Valentine in the Vineyard (2019)
- Jingle Around the Clock (2018)
- Welcome to Christmas (2018)
- A Twist of Christmas (2018)
- The Girl in the Bathtub (2018)
- Harry & Meghan: A Royal Romance (2018)
- Frozen in Love (2018)
- Secret Millionaire (2018)
- Doomsday (2017)
- Yellow (2017)
- Royal New Year's Eve (2017)
- The Christmas Cottage (2017)
- Christmas at Holly Lodge (2017)
- Christmas Homecoming (2017)
- I Am Elizabeth Smart (2017)
- Marry Me at Christmas (2017)
- A Harvest Wedding(2017)
- Descendants 2 (2017)
- Little Pink House (2017)
- Nightmare Time (2016)
- A Christmas to Remember (2016)
- Christmas List (2016)
- Operation Christmas (2016)
- Who Killed JonBenét? (2016)
- Autumn in the Vineyard (2016)
- Twist of Fate (2016)
- Adventures in Babysitting (2016)
- Sandra Brown's White Hot (2016)
- All Yours (2016)
- Toni Braxton: Unbreak My Heart (2016)
- Evil Men (2015)
- The Hollow (2015)
- Just the Way You Are (2015)
- Aurora Teagarden Mystery: A Bone to Pick (2015)
- I Do, I Do, I Do (2015)
- Vow of Violence (2014)
- Damaged (2014)
- Grumpy Cat's Worst Christmas Ever (2014)
- The Christmas Secret (2014)
- Recipe for Love (2013)
- Stolen from the Womb (2013)
- The Color of Rain (2013)
- The Good Mistress (2013)
- Hats Off to Christmas! (2013)
- Let It Snow (2013)
- Scarecrow (2013)
- Mr Hockey: The Gordie Howe Story (2013)
- Profile for Murder (2013)
- The Trainer (2013)
- Twist of Faith (2013)
- Nearlyweds (2013)
- Finding Mrs. Claus (2012)
- The Wishing Tree (2012)
- Love at the Thanksgiving Day Parade (2012)
- Gone (2011)
- Battle of the Bulbs (2010)
- Shooting Gunless (2010)
- Mistresses (2009)
- A.M.P.E.D. (2007)
- Kraken: Tentacles of the Deep (2006)
- Bratty Babies (2005)
- Marker (2005)
- Johnny Total (2005)
- Cable Beach (2004)
- Mob Princess (2003)
- Dead in a Heartbeat (2002)
- Romantic Comedy 101 (2002)
- Till Dad Do Us Part (2001)
- Spinning Out of Control (2001)
- Leo's Journey (2000)
- Murder at the Cannes Film Festival (2000)
- Special Delivery (2000)
- Final Ascent (2000)
- Becoming Dick (2000)
- The Man Who Used to Be Me (2000)
- The Spiral Staircase (2000)
- Best Actress (2000)
- Ice Angel (2000)
- Heaven's Fire (1999)
- Don't Look Behind You (1999)
- The Darklings (1999)
- Catch Me If You Can (1998)
- Shari's Passover Surprise (1996)
- Lamb Chop's Special Chanukah (1995)

== Professional awards ==
Award (Event)	Result	Year	Category	Production
Leo	Nominated	2023	Best Television Movie	Three Wise Men and a Baby (2022)
Leo	Nominated	2023	Best Television Movie	Mid-Love Crisis (2022)
Leo	Nominated	2023	Best Motion Picture	Float (2023)
Leo	Won	2022	Best Television Movie	A Clüsterfünke Christmas (2021)
Daytime Emmy Awards	Nominated	2021	Outstanding Young Adult Series	Julie and the Phantoms (2020)
Leo	Nominated	2021	Best Television Movie	Sleeping with Danger (2020)
Leo	Nominated	2021	Best Television Movie	A Sugar & Spice Holiday (2020)
Leo	Nominated	2021	Best Television Movie	Love, Lights, Hanukkah! (2020)
Leo	Won	2021	Best Television Movie	Aurora Teagarden Mysteries: Heist and Seek (2020)
Leo	Nominated	2020	Best Television Movie	Aurora Teagarden Mysteries: A Very Foul Play (2019)
Leo	Won	2020	Best Television Movie	Poisoned Love: The Stacey Castor Story (2020)
Pena de Prata	Nominated	2020	Best Comedy Series	Julie and the Phantoms (2020)
Leo	Nominated	2019	Best Dramatic Series	The Good Doctor (2017)
Leo	Nominated	2019	Best Dramatic Series	Valley of the Boom (2019)
Leo	Nominated	2019	Best Television Movie	Victoria Gotti: My Father's Daughter (2019)
Leo	Won	2019	Best Television Movie	Harry & Meghan: A Royal Romance (2018)
Leo	Nominated	2018	Best Television Movie	Cocaine Godmother (2017)
Leo	Nominated	2018	Best Motion Picture	1922 (2017)
Leo	Nominated	2017	Best Television Movie	The Julius House: An Aurora Teagarden Mystery (2016)
Leo	Won	2017	Best Television Movie	Toni Braxton: Unbreak My Heart (2016)
Leo	Nominated	2017	Best Motion Picture	Little Pink House (2017)
Leo	Nominated	2017	Best Motion Picture	The 9th Life of Louis Drax (2016)
Leo	Nominated	2016	Best Motion Picture	The Confirmation (2016)
Depth of Field International Film Festival Competition	Won	2015	Award of Merit Short Film Drama	Greece
Leo	Nominated	2015	Best Television Movie	The Christmas Secret (2014)
Leo	Nominated	2015	Best Dramatic Series	Witches of East End (2013)
Leo	Nominated	2015	Best Television Movie	Grumpy Cat's Worst Christmas Ever (2014)
Canadian Screen Award (Gemini)	Nominated	2014	Best Dramatic Mini-Series or TV Movie	Mr Hockey: The Gordie Howe Story (2013)
Leo	Won	2014	Best Television Movie	Mr Hockey: The Gordie Howe Story (2013)
Leo	Nominated	2014	Best Television Movie	The Color of Rain (2014)
Leo	Nominated	2014	Best Television Movie	Delete (2012)
Leo	Won	2011	Best Feature Length Drama	Gunless (2010)
Genie	Nominated	2010	Best Motion Picture	Fifty Dead Men Walking (2008)
Leo	Won	2010	Best Youth or Children's Program or Series	Stormworld (2009)
Leo	Nominated	2010	Best Feature Length Drama	The Thaw (2009)
Leo	Nominated	2009	Best Feature Length Drama	Fifty Dead Men Walking (2008)
Leo	Nominated	2008	Best Feature Length Drama	Normal (2007)
Leo	Nominated	2008	Best Feature Length Drama	They Wait (2007)
DVDX Award	Nominated	2003	Best Live Action DVD Premiere Movie	Finder's Fee (2001)
