= Under Wraps (1997 film) =

1997 American television comedy film

- Promotional poster
- Written by: Don Rhymer
- Directed by: Greg Beeman
- Starring: Adam Wylie; Mario Yedidia; Clara Bryant; Ken Campbell; Corinne Bohrer; Penny Peyser; Ed Lauter; Bill Fagerbakke
- Music by: David Michael Frank
- Country of origin: United States
- Original language: English

Production
- Producer: Don Rhymer
- Cinematography: Mark W. Gray
- Editor: Norman Hollyn
- Running time: 95 minutes
- Production companies: Mummy Entertainment; Hallmark Entertainment

Original release
- Network: Disney Channel
- Release: October 25, 1997

Related
- Under Wraps (2021)

Under Wraps is a 1997 American television comedy film directed by Greg Beeman and starring Bill Fagerbakke (in a dual role), Adam Wylie, Mario Yedidia, and Clara Bryant, and the first Disney Channel Original Movie (DCOM) by Disney Channel. This television film was shot in Chico, California. It was included by the network in its 100 DCOMs celebration from May–June 2016.

== Plot ==
Marshall is a pre-teen who loves horror films and lives with his single mother. He struggles with the absence of his father and his mother's boyfriend, Ted. Despite not sharing his interest in horror, he has two best friends named Amy and Gilbert. Hearing rumors of a body kept in the basement of the recently deceased Mr. Kubat's house, the trio sneaks into the house to investigate the rumor. They discover that Kubat was storing an Egyptian mummy, seemingly illegally. When moonlight strikes an ancient amulet, the mummy is resurrected. He scares the kids, but they soon discover he's harmless, albeit clumsy.

They decide to name the mummy Harold and realize they need to hide him for his own safety. They visit their adult friend, Bruce, who owns a horror shop and has an encyclopedic knowledge of the occult, mythology, and the supernatural. He tells them that if the mummy isn't returned to his sarcophagus before midnight on Halloween, he'll perish.

Unfortunately, Harold's sarcophagus remains in Mr. Kubat's house, who himself turns out to have faked his own death as a method of tax evasion. Additionally, Kubat is involved in various schemes, including trafficking black market artifacts, like Harold and his sarcophagus. Discovering that the sarcophagus is empty, Kubat dispatches his men to hunt the mummy down quickly due to having a buyer interested in the artifacts.

Despite having an easier time blending in at a Halloween party, Harold is discovered and apprehended by Kubat's men. The kids enlist Bruce's help to rescue Harold. The group defeats Kubat and his men and reunites Harold with the female mummy he loves. The two mummies return to their sarcophagi and re-enter their eternal rest.

After the adventure with his friends, Marshall decides the mature thing to do would be to accept his mom's boyfriend and scale back his horror fandom. He then goes to the movies with Gilbert and Amy, signaling that he has feelings for Amy.

== Cast ==
- Mario Yedidia as Marshall
- Adam Wylie as Gilbert Anderson
- Clara Bryant as Amy
- Bill Fagerbakke as Harold, a mummy.
  - Fagerbakke also portrays Ted, Marshall's mom's boyfriend
- Ken Campbell as Bruce
- Ed Lauter as Mr. Kubat, the main antagonist of the film.
- Corinne Bohrer as Marshall's Mom
- Tom Virtue as Movie Dad
- Laura Leary as Movie Mom
- Penny Peyser as Amy's Mom
- Telly Blackwood as Window Shopper
- Trenton Gaucher as Movie Ben
- Brooke Garrett as Movie Molly
- Joshua Dennis as Leonard
- Ryan Schofield as Todd
- Nakia Burrise as Paige
- Velina Brown as Mother in Park
- Robert Bailey Jr. as Boy in Park
- Wilma Bonet as Desk Nurse
- Atim Udoffia as E.R. Nurse
- Greg Watanabe as Doctor
- Linda Gehringer as Connie
- Kenneth Fisher as Principal Phil Hammer
- Anni Long as Jane
- Louis Landman as Kubat's Goon
- Jon Favreau as Kubat's Young Goon
- Sean McFarland as Goon at Window
- Lance Brady as Art Dealer
- Rueben Grundy as Cop
- Cristina Patterson as Female Mummy
- Joel McDonell as Doctor (uncredited)
- Rusty Nelson as Doctor (uncredited)

== Home media ==
The film was unavailable on home video until 2005, when Echo Bridge Entertainment released it on DVD. The film was made available to stream on Disney+ on October 9, 2026.

== 2021 Remake and sequel ==
On November 13, 2020, it was announced that a remake of the film would premiere in October 2021 with Christian J. Simon, Malachi Barton, Sophia Hammons, and Phil Wright starring and Alex Zamm directing and co-writing the remake with William Robertson. A sequel was announced on February 7, 2022. The sequel, titled Under Wraps 2, was released on September 25, 2022.

== See also ==
- List of films set around Halloween
