= Tooth Fairy (2010 film) =

Film by Michael Lembeck

- Theatrical release poster
- Directed by: Michael Lembeck
- Screenplay by: Lowell Ganz; Babaloo Mandel; Joshua Sternin; Jennifer Ventimilia; Randi Mayem Singer
- Story by: Jim Piddock
- Produced by: Mark Ciardi; Gordon Gray; Jason Blum
- Starring: Dwayne Johnson; Ashley Judd; Julie Andrews
- Cinematography: David Tattersall
- Edited by: David Finfer
- Music by: George S. Clinton
- Production companies: Walden Media; Mayhem Pictures; Blumhouse Productions; Dune Entertainment
- Distributed by: 20th Century Fox
- Release date: January 22, 2010
- Running time: 101 minutes
- Countries: Canada; United States
- Language: English
- Budget: $48 million
- Box office: $112 million

Tooth Fairy is a 2010 fantasy comedy family film directed by Michael Lembeck and produced by Jason Blum, Mark Ciardi and Gordon Gray. It was written by Lowell Ganz, Babaloo Mandel, Randi Mayem Singer, Joshua Sternin and Jennifer Ventimilia with music by George S. Clinton, and stars Dwayne Johnson in the title role, Ashley Judd, and Julie Andrews.

Filmed in Vancouver, British Columbia, it was co-produced by Walden Media and distributed and theatrically released by 20th Century Fox on January 22, 2010. The film was given a negative reception from critics. It was commercially successful, grossing $112 million on a $48 million budget. A direct-to-video sequel, Tooth Fairy 2, starred Larry the Cable Guy as the title character and was released on March 6, 2012.

== Plot ==
Derek Thompson is a minor league ice hockey enforcer, nicknamed "Tooth Fairy" for his habit of shoving opposing players so hard, their teeth come out. One night, he steals a dollar from his girlfriend Carly's six-year-old daughter Tess that had been left for her lost tooth, telling her that the tooth fairy doesn't exist. He receives a magical Summons under his pillow, which causes him to grow wings and transports him to the realm of tooth fairies. He meets his caseworker, Tracy, and the head fairy, Lily, and develops an adversarial relationship with both. Lily sentences Derek to serve as a tooth fairy for two weeks as a punishment for his unsympathetic dealings with children like Tess. Later, he meets Jerry, who gives him his tooth fairy supplies, which include "Shrinking Paste," "Invisible Spray," "dog peppermints", "Amnesia Dust", "cat away" and a magic wand that will only work if he believes.

Carly's 14-year-old son, Randy, dislikes Derek. Randy wants to grow up to be a heavy metal star. When Derek defends Randy against a bully, he begins to win him over, and he begins teaching Randy to play his electric guitar better so he can win a talent show. Derek visits several children and tries to collect teeth and give out dollars, but a mixture of obstacles, incompetence, and bad luck causes him to fail. Lily denies Derek any more supplies from Jerry for the remainder of his sentence, criticizing his lack of faith in children. Afterward, he is approached by a fairy named Ziggy who provides him black market supplies. Later that night, the items malfunction and Derek is seen by a child's mother and arrested. Tracy tells Derek that Lily extended his duty to three weeks and offers to give him proper supplies if he will start acting like a tooth fairy; Carly soon comes to bail Derek out.

Derek works on improving his tooth fairy skills and bonding with Tracy and Randy, but when Derek can't score a goal at a hockey game, his coach threatens to bench him at the next game. When he sees Carly and her kids, he takes his frustration out on Randy, telling him that he will never become a rock star. Randy tearfully smashes his guitar, and a disappointed Carly breaks up with him. Later, Tracy comes to Derek's house to announce that he is a tooth fairy-in-training, much to Derek's annoyance. At the next hockey game, Derek gets back on the ice and sees Tracy, who silently encourages him to score a goal, which he does, finally learning the importance of dreams. Tracy then reveals to Derek that his next tooth fairy assignment is at Tess' house, and Derek accepts the job, gets into his tooth fairy costume, and flies away, while Tracy spreads Amnesia Dust on the audience to cover up the event.

At Carly's, Tess sees Derek taking her tooth, and he reveals that he is a tooth fairy, which she promises to keep secret. Derek apologizes to Randy and encourages him to keep pursuing his dreams, using his magic wand to grant Randy a new guitar. Downstairs, Carly sees Derek as a tooth fairy but assumes that he rented a costume for Tess' sake, causing her to forgive him. Derek flies Randy to the talent show, throwing Amnesia Dust on him when they arrive. Derek heads back to the fairy realm to give Lily the tooth and is told that because of this job, as well as for reaffirming Tess' belief, he has been relieved of his fairy duties. Lily explains that he will never see the tooth fairies again and will have Amnesia Dust thrown on him. Before departing, Derek says a friendly goodbye to Tracy. Lily throws Amnesia Dust on Derek and transports him back to the talent show. There, Randy outperforms everyone and forms a band. Derek's newfound optimism remains intact, and he proposes to Carly, who accepts.

Later, Derek is seen playing left wing for the Los Angeles Kings, and when he sees Lily and Jerry in the crowd, he doesn't recognize them. Jerry secretly helps him score a goal.

== Cast ==
- Dwayne Johnson as Derek Thompson, a hockey player forced to become a Tooth Fairy as punishment for being a dream crusher
- Ashley Judd as Carly Harris, Derek's girlfriend, Randy and Tess's mom
- Julie Andrews as Lily, the head of the Tooth Fairies
- Stephen Merchant as Tracy, a wingless tooth fairy assigned to be Derek's case manager
- Ryan Sheckler as Mick "the Stick" Donnelly, Derek's new teammate, a highly talented, but disrespectful young hockey player
- Seth MacFarlane as Ziggy, a fairy that sells black market tooth fairy items
- Chase Ellison as Randy Harris, Carly's son and Tess's older brother who loves electric guitar
- Destiny Grace Whitlock as Tess Harris, Carly's daughter and Randy's younger sister
- Brandon T. Jackson as Duke
- Brendan Meyer as Ben, Randy's classmate who verbally attacks him.
- Billy Crystal as Jerry, a fairy working for Lily who provides Derek his tooth fairy supplies (uncredited)
- Josh Emerson as Kyle Padgett
- Dan Joffre as the Tooth Fairy #1
- Ellie Harvie as the Permit Woman
- Barclay Hope as The Hockey Team Coach
- Michael Daingerfield as The Hockey Game Broadcast Announcer
- Chad Brownlee as unnamed hockey player

== Production ==
The hockey scenes were filmed at the Great Western Forum using players from the Los Angeles Kings. The score for Tooth Fairy was composed by George S. Clinton and recorded in the spring of 2009 with an 80-piece ensemble of the Hollywood Studio Symphony at the Newman Scoring Stage at 20th Century Fox studios. Before Billy Crystal was cast, future Saturday Night Live cast member Bobby Moynihan was offered his role, but he turned it down due to joining the show.

== Reception ==
=== Box office ===
The film was released on January 22, 2010, and opened in 3,344 theaters and took in $3.5 million its opening day, with an average of $1,060 per theater. On its opening weekend, it grossed $14 million with an average of $4,190 per theater. It ranked #4, behind Avatar, Legion, and The Book of Eli; the film rose to #3 on that weekend in Canada with $16 million and remained #4 in the U.S. on its second weekend, behind Avatar, Edge of Darkness, and When in Rome. The film became a box office hit grossing $60 million in the United States and Canada, and $51.8 million in other markets, for worldwide total gross of $112 million.

=== Critical response ===
On the review aggregator website Rotten Tomatoes, 17% of 113 critics' reviews are positive, with an average rating of 4/10. The website's consensus reads: "Dwayne Johnson brings the full force of his charm (and his appropriately pale chompers) to the title role, but flat direction and a committee-written script render The Tooth Fairy unacceptably dull." On Metacritic, it has a weighted average score of 36 out of 100, based on 24 critics, indicating "generally unfavorable" reviews. Audiences polled by CinemaScore gave the film an average grade of "A−" on an A+ to F scale.

== Home media ==
Tooth Fairy was released on DVD and in a Blu-ray Disc/DVD/digital copy combination pack on May 4, 2010, by 20th Century Fox Home Entertainment.

== Sequel ==
Tooth Fairy was followed by a sequel, starring Larry the Cable Guy as the title character. Directed by Alex Zamm, Tooth Fairy 2 had a direct-to-video release on March 6, 2012.

== See also ==
- List of films about ice hockey
- List of films featuring miniature people
