= Brightlight Pictures =

Canadian film studio

- Founded: 2001
- Founder: Shawn Williamson
- Headquarters: Vancouver, British Columbia, Canada
- Key people: Shawn Williamson (CEO, President)

Brightlight Pictures Inc. is a Canadian film and television production and distribution company based in Vancouver, British Columbia, Canada. Shawn Williamson is the company chairman.

== History ==
Brightlight has produced more than 90 works in the last 15 years and over 35 productions since 2001, including White Noise starring Michael Keaton, which grossed over $100 million since its worldwide theatrical release in 2005.

Brightlight has worked on films with Inferno Picture Pictures, Baldwin Entertainment, Gold Circle Films, and Universal Studios, and has been credited for work for CBC Television, Hallmark Channel, Mandate Pictures, Lionsgate Films, Nu Image/Millennium Films, Emmett/Furla/Oasis Films, The Weinstein Company, and Yari Film Group.

Brightlight's television credits include the TV series Saved for TNT and Fox 21 and About a Girl for MTV's TeenNick Network and Global Television. Brightlight produced the CTV/Space Channel series Stormworld, an Australian/Singaporean/Canadian Treaty co-production shot in Perth, Broome, Singapore and Vancouver.

Brightlight's UK/Canada feature co-production Fifty Dead Men Walking starring Ben Kingsley, Jim Sturgess and Kevin Zegers had its world premiere as a Gala Presentation at the Toronto International Film Festival in September 2008 and was released theatrically in the summer of 2009. Brightlight also produced Frankie & Alice starring Halle Berry and Stellan Skarsgård and the feature film Gunless, a comedy western co-produced with Niv Fichman's Rhombus Media and distributed by Alliance Films starring Paul Gross, Sienna Guillory and Graham Greene.

== Brightlight Pictures productions ==
- Punch (2002)
- Try Seventeen (2002)
- Mob Princess (2003) (TV)
- Alienated (2003) (TV)
- House of the Dead (2003)
- Pink Ludoos (2004)
- Going the Distance (2004)
- Lies Like Truth (2004)
- Cable Beach (2004) (TV)
- Edison (2005)
- How to Make a Canadian Film (2005)
- The Long Weekend (2005)
- Marker (2005) (TV)
- Alone in the Dark (2005)
- White Noise (2005)
- Johnny Tootall (2005) (TV)
- Severed: Forest of the Dead (2005)
- Slither (2006)
- Saved (2006) (TV)
- Kraken: Tentacles of the Deep (2006)
- In the Name of the King (2006)
- The Wicker Man (2006)
- BloodRayne (2006)
- 88 Minutes (2007)
- Postal (2007)
- They Wait (2007)
- American Venus (2007)
- BloodRayne II: Deliverance (2007)
- A.M.P.E.D. (2007) (TV)
- White Noise 2: The Light (2007)
- Frankie & Alice (2008)
- The Final Storm (2008)
- The Guard (2008) (TV)
- Rampage (2008)
- The Thaw (2008)
- Stormworld (2008) (TV)
- Mistresses (2008) (TV)
- Fifty Dead Men Walking (2008)
- Far Cry (2008)
- About A Girl (2008)
- Shooting Gunless (2010) (TV)
- Raging Boll (2010)
- Gunless (2010)
- In the Name of the King 2: Two Worlds (2011)
- BloodRayne: The Third Reich (2011)
- The Company You Keep (2012)
- Delete (2012) (TV)
- Witches of East End (2013)
- Horns (2013)
- Mr. Hockey: The Gordie Howe Story (2013) (TV)
- Profile for Murder (2013) (TV)
- The Trainer (2013) (TV)
- Rush (2014)
- The 9th Life of Louis Drax (2015)
- Haters Back Off (2016)
- Second Chance (2016)
- Colossal (2016)
- Elsewhere (2018)
- Status Update (2018)
- Summer of 84 (2018)
- Julie and the Phantoms (2020)
- Firefly Lane (2021)
- Under Wraps (2021)
- Under Wraps 2 (2022)
- Monster High: The Movie (2022)
- It Lives Inside (2023)
- Monster High 2 (2023)
- Earth Abides (2024)
- Lockbox (2026)
