= Tooth Fairy 2 =

- DVD cover
- Directed by: Alex Zamm
- Written by: Ben Zazove
- Based on: Characters by Jim Piddock
- Produced by: Alan C. Blomquist; J.P Williams
- Starring: Larry the Cable Guy; David Mackey; Erin Beute; Brady Reiter
- Cinematography: Levie Isaacks
- Edited by: Heath Ryan
- Music by: Chris Hajian
- Production company: Walden Media
- Distributed by: 20th Century Fox Home Entertainment
- Release date: March 6, 2012
- Running time: 90 minutes
- Countries: United States; Canada
- Language: English

Tooth Fairy 2 is a 2012 American fantasy comedy family film directed by Alex Zamm and starring Larry the Cable Guy in the lead role. It is the stand-alone sequel to the 2010 film Tooth Fairy, starring Dwayne Johnson. It was released direct-to-video on DVD and Blu-ray on March 6, 2012.

== Plot ==
Larry Guthrie (Larry the Cable Guy), a dreamer from a small town, is awarded the title of "Metro County Miracle." While on his way to a child's birthday party, Larry and his girlfriend Brooke (Erin Beute) stop at a raffle for a Camaro convertible. Larry puts his name in the raffle, against Brooke’s will, and wins the chance to get the car. In order to win, Larry has three chances to knock down two bowling pins on either side of the lane. On his third try, with both bowling pins left, he slips on nacho cheese sauce and successfully knocks down the pins with the bowling ball. Some time later, after Larry and Brooke end their relationship, Larry finds out that Brooke is engaged to the hotshot of the town, Beauregard "Bo" Billings (David Mackey). Bo Billings is a candidate for mayor of the town, which motivates Larry to attempt to win her back.

In order to win back Brooke's affection, Larry volunteers at the local after-school program that Brooke runs. On his first day volunteering, he tells one of the children that the Tooth Fairy isn't real, deeply upsetting the little boy Gabe, and making him doubt the realness of the Tooth Fairy. That night, Larry is approached by a Tooth Fairy named Nyx and gets a head-to-toe pink fairy outfit, who tells him he is a substitute Tooth Fairy and must collect ten teeth in ten days. Larry is given fairy dust to help him and is told that if he fails to collect ten teeth, his greatest memory will be taken away.

Larry awakens from what he thought was a dream, but soon finds out he was wrong. The following night, he turns into the Tooth Fairy and goes to collect his first tooth. He manages to collect it, with some difficulty, but is very proud of his abilities. The next night, he turns into the Tooth Fairy again. During this time, he is beginning to make improvements at the after-school program, helping them raise money for new supplies. Brooke is starting to warm up to him and tells him she is happy with what he has done. The couple goes wedding cake testing, where Larry, unlike Bo, who shows up to get her away from Larry, remembers Brooke is allergic to strawberries and likes orange buttercream, which impresses her. He then offers to go out and buy the supplies with the money they made, in hopes of impressing Brooke further.

Shortly after Larry collects the supplies for the program, he turns into the Tooth Fairy and is forced to serve his duties. While he is collecting a tooth, Bo steals the supplies, in order to make Larry look bad. When Larry returns from collecting the tooth, he is shocked to find his car empty, and has to break the news to Brooke and the kids the next day.

Feeling discouraged, Larry decides to quit his job as the Tooth Fairy and lose what he thought was his greatest memory. When he finds out that winning the Metro County Miracle wasn't his greatest memory, he is confused. He decides to reclaim his role as the Tooth Fairy, with little time to spare. After successfully collecting the remainder of the teeth and restoring the children's beliefs in the Tooth Fairy, Larry finds out that his greatest memory was one shared with Brooke. Larry decides to tell Brooke this, and when she asks Bo for his greatest memory, she is disappointed to find it’s not about her and realizes what a self-absorbed man he truly is. She ends her engagement with Bo and rekindles her love with Larry. Bo confronts Larry at his trailer; Bo vows payback but crashes into a table and gets amnesia powder dropped on him as Larry starts flying, realizing Brooke loves him. The film ends with Brooke and Larry married, living in a home together, expecting a child. Nyx appears asking Larry to fill in because the regional tooth fairy is sick, which he accepts and flies off into the night to get the tooth.

== Cast ==
- Larry the Cable Guy as Larry Guthrie
- David Mackey as Beauregard "Bo" Billings
- Erin Beute as Brooke Miller
- Brady Reiter as Nyx
- Rachel DuRose as Rachel

== Reception ==
Common Sense Media gave the film a negative review, stating the "weak sequel lacks laughs, clarity, and likeable characters." James Plath of Movie Metropolis stated: "If you still believe in the Tooth Fairy or are still young enough to remember the magic you might think this is funny. Me? I was just creeped out and reminded that I'd better check all the doors and windows before we went to sleep."

The Radio Times gave the film 2 out of 5. Robert Bell writing for Exclaim.ca calls the first Tooth Fairy film "borderline unwatchable" and that the sequel was "misguided".
