= The Absence of Eden =

2023 thriller film

- Theatrical release poster
- Directed by: Marco Perego
- Written by: Marco Perego; Rick Rapoza
- Produced by: Karl Herrmann; Robert Kravis; Alexandra Milchan; Marco Perego; Zoe Saldaña; Julie Yorn; Rick Yorn
- Starring: Zoe Saldaña; Garrett Hedlund; Adria Arjona; Sophia Hammons
- Cinematography: Javier Juliá
- Edited by: Lee Haugen
- Music by: Oliver Coates
- Production companies: Ashland Hill Media Finance; Cinestar Pictures; Ingenious Media; Pioneer Pictures
- Distributed by: Roadside Attractions; Vertical Entertainment
- Release dates: June 23, 2023 (Taormina Film Festival); April 12, 2024 (United States)
- Running time: 85 minutes
- Countries: United States; United Kingdom
- Language: English
- Box office: $37,265

The Absence of Eden is a 2023 thriller film directed and co-written by Marco Perego. It stars Zoe Saldaña, Garrett Hedlund, Adria Arjona and Sophia Hammons.

The film was released in the United States on April 12, 2024.

== Plot ==
An American Immigration and Customs Enforcement agent struggling with the moral dilemmas of border security and an undocumented woman fighting to escape a ruthless cartel cross paths and work together to save the life of an innocent girl.

== Cast ==
- Zoe Saldaña as Esmee
- Garrett Hedlund as Shipp
- Adria Arjona as Yadira
- Sophia Hammons as Alma

== Production ==
In June 2023, it was announced that a thriller film titled The Absence of Eden had completed principal photography in New Mexico. It was directed and co-written by first-time filmmaker Marco Perego, and it starred Zoe Saldaña, Garrett Hedlund and Adria Arjona.

== Release ==
The Absence of Eden had its world premiere at the Taormina Film Festival on June 23, 2023. The film was released in the United States by Roadside Attractions and Vertical Entertainment on April 12, 2024.

== Reception ==
On review aggregator Rotten Tomatoes, 41% of 17 critics gave the film a positive review, with an average rating of 5.0/10, earning it a "Rotten" score.
