= MarVista Entertainment =

American production company

MarVista Entertainment, LLC
- Logo used since 2021
- Type: Subsidiary
- Industry: Entertainment
- Founded: 2003; 23 years ago
- Headquarters: Westwood, Los Angeles, California, United States
- Key people: Fernando Szew (CEO); Michael Jacobs (partner)
- Products: Motion pictures Television programs
- Parent: Fox Entertainment (2021–present)
- Divisions: Tideline Entertainment
- Website: www.marvista.net

MarVista Entertainment, LLC is an American independent production company, based in Westwood, Los Angeles, California. The company mainly provides financing for made-for-TV films and direct-to-SVOD titles.

== History ==
MarVista was founded in 2003 by Fernando Joseph Szew and Michael Jacobs as a commission-based distributor of third party programming. As of 2015, MarVista had expanded its library of 250 hours of licensed programming to over 2,500 hours of programming to television broadcasters and other global distribution channels in its 125 territories, including video on demand (VOD), subscription video on demand (SVOD), and broadband platforms through MarVista Digital Entertainment (MVDE).

MVDE was launched in 2014 to handle distribution and licensing of the company's digital content in North America.

Beginning after acquiring capital investments in 2011, the company also began creating its own television and feature film content.

In 2016, MarVista and Elijah Wood's SpectreVision announced an agreement to co-produce four horror and thriller films over the following two years.

In December 2021, Fox Corporation announced that it had acquired MarVista Entertainment. The studio will develop original content for Fox's ad-supported streaming service Tubi, while continuing to produce and distribute content for third-party broadcasters and platforms.

In January 2024, Fox and MarVista announced the launch of specialty label Tideline Entertainment to focus on diverse content for multiple platforms. The thriller film Ponyboi was announced as Tideline's first project.

== Filmography ==
=== Feature films ===
- Sand Castles (2014)
- Consumed (2015)
- Characterz (2016)
- Sightless (2020)
- Hunter Hunter (2020)
- Frankie Meets Jack (2023)

=== Television films ===
- 16 Wishes (2010)
- A 2nd Chance (2011)
- Last Hours in Suburbia (2012)
- Radio Rebel (2012)
- If I Had Wings (2013)
- Stonados (2013)
- House of Versace (2013)
- Betrayed (2014)
- 8 Days (2014)
- Fatal Acquittal (2014)
- Grantham & Rose (2014)
- Zapped (2014)
- From the Rough (2014)
- 10.0 Earthquake (2014)
- 10,000 Days (2014)
- Sex Ed (2014)
- A Christmas Kiss II (2014)
- Caught (2015)
- Cyber Case (2015)
- A Sort of Homecoming (2015)
- The Saver (2015)
- A Teacher's Obsession (2015)
- A Deadly Adoption (2015)
- 16 and Missing (2015)
- Perfect Match (2015)
- Rodeo & Juliet (2015)
- The Spirit of Christmas (2015)
- Accidentally Engaged (2016)
- Accidental Switch (2016)
- The Cheerleader Murders (2016)
- 911 Nightmare (2016)
- Raising the Bar (2016)
- Her Dark Past (2016)
- Her Last Will (2016)
- Hidden Truth (2016)
- Honeymoon from Hell (2016)
- Jessica Darling's It List (2016)
- A Mother's Escape (2016)
- Nightmare Nurse (2016)
- Runaway (2016)
- Unwanted Guest (2016)
- The Watcher (2016)
- Give Me My Baby (2016)
- The Wrong Car (2016)
- The Swap (2016)
- Deadly Detention (2017)
- Boyfriend Killer (2017)
- The Other Mother (2017)
- The Twin (2017)
- My Daughter Is Missing (2017)
- Cradle Swapping (2017)
- Heartthrob (2017)
- 12 Feet Deep (2017)
- Stage Fright (2017)
- The Good Nanny (2017)
- The Year of the Spectacular Man (2017)
- Off the Rails (2017)
- Toxic Shark (2017)
- Rip Tide (2017)
- Bitch (2017)
- House of the Witch (2017)
- Deadly Detention (2017)
- A Woman Deceived (2017)
- Tiny Christmas (2017)
- Dangerous Company (2018)
- Frenzy (2018)
- Deadly Matrimony (2018)
- Room for Murder (2018)
- Silencer (2018)
- The Work Wife (2018)
- The Truth About Christmas (2018)
- Christmas Camp (2018)
- Only Mine (2019)
- In Bed with a Killer (2019)
- Deadly Switch (2019)
- Hidden in Plain Sight (2019)
- Back of the Net (2019)
- Secrets in a Small Town (2019)
- The Husband (2019)
- Anniversary Nightmare (2019)
- Next Level (2019)
- Deviant Love (2019)
- Under Wraps (2021)
- Under Wraps 2 (2022)
- The Curious Case Of Dolphin Bay (2022)

=== Television shows ===
- Mustard Pancakes (2005–2007)
- Beyond the Break (2006–2009)
- Power Rangers Samurai (2011)
- Power Rangers Super Samurai (2012)
- Power Rangers Megaforce (2013)
- Julius Jr. (2013–2015, Non-American)
- Digimon Fusion (2014–2016, Non-American)
- Power Rangers Super Megaforce (2014)
- Best Worst Weekend Ever (2018)
