= Summer of 84 =

2018 film

- Theatrical release poster
- Directed by: François Simard; Anouk Whissell; Yoann-Karl Whissell
- Written by: Matt Leslie; Stephen J. Smith
- Produced by: Shawn Williamson; Jameson Parker; Matt Leslie; Van Toffler; Cody Zwieg
- Starring: Graham Verchere; Judah Lewis; Caleb Emery; Cory Grüter-Andrew; Tiera Skovbye; Rich Sommer
- Cinematography: Jean-Philippe Bernier
- Edited by: Austin Andrews
- Music by: Le Matos
- Production companies: Gunpowder & Sky; Brightlight Pictures
- Distributed by: Gunpowder & Sky
- Release dates: January 22, 2018 (Sundance); August 10, 2018 (United States)
- Running time: 105 minutes
- Countries: Canada; United States
- Language: English

Summer of 84 is a 2018 teen horror film directed by François Simard, Anouk Whissell, and Yoann-Karl Whissell and written by Matt Leslie and Stephen J. Smith. The film stars Graham Verchere, Judah Lewis, Caleb Emery, Cory Grüter-Andrew, Tiera Skovbye, and Rich Sommer.

The film premiered at the Sundance Film Festival on January 22, 2018. It was given a limited theatrical release in the United States on August 10, 2018, by Gunpowder & Sky. It received positive reviews from critics, with many praising the performances, direction, dark humor, and screenplay, and many calling it one of the best horror films of 2018.

== Plot ==
Over the decade leading up to the summer of 1984, a total of 13 teenage boys disappeared in Cape May, Oregon, but their disappearances have never been connected or solved.

As the summer begins, 15-year-old Davey Armstrong, who works a paper route in Ipswich, initially enjoys carefree diversion with his friends, Dale "Woody" Woodworth, Curtis Farraday, and Tommy "Eats" Eaton. They spend time on Eats' treehouse, which will be torn down by his belligerent father. They fantasize about Nikki, an attractive girl who used to be Davey's babysitter.

Davey suspects that his neighbor Wayne Mackey, a well-liked police officer in the community, is the Cape May Slayer. Because of Davey's fondness for conspiracy theories and urban legends, Davey's friends reject this theory.

When a boy Davey had seen inside Mackey's house goes missing, they agree to help him investigate. Meanwhile, Nikki visits with Davey, confiding that her parents are divorcing and she will be leaving the neighborhood.

Documenting Mackey's daily routine, the boys find many suspicious activities: Mackey regularly purchases gardening tools and bags of soil, brings a duffel bag to work every day, and goes on late-night jogs. One night, Davey is caught by Mackey while planting a walkie-talkie outside his window, and worries he is becoming suspicious.

While Mackey is away, the boys search his property. They present their findings, including a bloodstained T-shirt, supposedly belonging to the latest missing boy, to Davey's parents. To their dismay, his parents are outraged and call their investigation vandalism. Mr. Armstrong has the boys apologize to Mackey, and grounds Davey.

The next day, Mackey visits Davey's home and attempts to dissuade Davey's suspicion by claiming the boy who visited his home was his nephew, only for Davey to suspect him more. The following day, a suspect is arrested in the Cape May Slayer case, with Mackey the arresting officer. Disgusted, Davey makes plans to break into Mackey's home during the Cape May Festival. Farraday, who attends the festival as a lookout, discovers that the bags of soil were purchased for a city beautification project, and he and Eats abandon their posts.

Davey, Woody, and Nikki enter Mackey's home with Mr. Armstrong's video camera and explore a locked room in the basement, decorated to resemble Mackey's childhood room. In the bathroom, they find the missing boy's desiccated corpse in the bathtub, along with a still-alive recent abductee. They find a wall of framed photographs of the missing children. There is a photo of Davey's family, indicating Davey will be the next target. They present their footage to the Ipswich Police Department, who issue an APB on Mackey, marking him as a wanted criminal. Davey's parents apologize to their son for not believing him.

Mackey, secretly hiding in Davey's attic, abducts Davey and Woody in the middle of the night. He takes them to an offshore island for a sadistic game of manhunt. As Mackey pursues them, the boys flee into the wilderness but lose their footing on a corpse dump. Mackey slashes Davey's leg then proceeds to slit Woody's throat. He spares Davey, leaving him traumatized and constantly paranoid.

After a hospital stay, Davey returns to his morning paperboy route. He passes Woody's house, now foreclosed. Nikki waves goodbye to him as her custodial parent drives her away. He comes upon Eats and Farraday trashing the demolished treehouse, both of them avoiding his gaze. Eventually Davey passes Mackey's house, plastered with police tape. He unfurls a newspaper, the headline announcing the Cape May Slayer is still at large.

== Cast ==
- Graham Verchere as Davey Armstrong
- Judah Lewis as Tommy "Eats" Eaton
- Caleb Emery as Dale "Woody" Woodworth
- Cory Grüter-Andrew as Curtis Farraday
- Tiera Skovbye as Nikki Kaszuba
- Rich Sommer as Wayne Mackey
- Jason Gray-Stanford as Randall Armstrong
- Shauna Johannesen as Sheila Armstrong
- William MacDonald as Sheriff Caldwell
- Harrison Houde as Bobby Coker
- Susie Castillo as Brenda Woodworth
- J. Alex Brinson as Officer Cole
- Mark Brandon as local news anchor

== Production ==
=== Writing and development ===
In October 2021, screenwriters Matthew Leslie and Stephen J Smith appeared on The Ghost of Hollywood, where they would discuss their work on Summer of '84 in detail, including that their script was already attached to RKSS in 2015, prior to the release of Stranger Things, that there have never been plans for a film sequel, and that the budget for the film was approximately $1.5 million.

The script earned a place on the 2016 Blood List.

=== Filming ===
Principal photography took place during July 2017 in Vancouver. The film was shot using a Red camera with anamorphic lens.

== Release ==
Summer of 84 premiered at the Sundance Film Festival on January 22, 2018. The film was released by Gunpowder & Sky in the United States in select theaters on August 10, 2018, and on video on demand and Digital HD on August 24, followed by a streaming release on Shudder on October 25. It had worldwide distribution deals.

== Reception ==
On the review aggregator website Rotten Tomatoes, the film holds an approval rating of 72% based on 64 reviews, with an average rating of 6.4/10. The website's critics consensus reads, "Summer of 84 suffers from an overreliance on nostalgia for its titular decade, but a number of effective jolts may still satisfy genre enthusiasts." Metacritic, which uses a weighted average, assigned the film a score of 56 out of 100, based on 8 critics, indicating "mixed or average" reviews.

JoBlo.com's Movie Emporium called the ending "an inspired wrap-up" and scored it 8/10. Bloody Disgusting's Fred Topel said it "hit the sweet spot for me" and expressed a need to "talk about it excessively". Film Threat said it "lulled you into a false sense of security and banality before slamming you into a brilliantly dark chilling finale. You won't be disappointed." Daily Dead found "even though the story does take a bit too long to get things moving, that's really just me nitpicking at the greatness that is Summer of 84." PopMatters' JR Kinnard said it was "a trashy classic that will absolutely rock midnight movie houses."

Variety found the film "neither funny nor scary enough to leave a lasting impression" and "more slowly paced than necessary, and those seeking horror content will find the payoff underwhelming after a protracted, mild buildup" and that "the leisurely progress isn't justified by any well-developed subplots, or by much suspense – there's never a doubt who the perp is, and apart from a couple of false-flag jump scares, little real peril surfaces until quite late." The review noted that it was unclear if the script by Matt Leslie and Stephen J. Smith was intended "to be played for satire, straight suspense, or a mixture of both."

The film won Best Screenplay for Matt Leslie and Stephen J. Smith at Cinepocalypse festival in Chicago.

It created buzz on the horror festival circuit in the United States and internationally, including featured or opening day screenings at Fantasia International Film Festival (Montreal) FrightFest (London), Sitges (Catalonia, Spain), /Slash Filmfest (Austria), and Hard:Line Film Festival (Germany). It received Jury Prize nominations at Molins Film Festival for Best Director, Best Film, and Best Screenplay.

Summer of 84 was included on multiple published best-of-year lists with notable highlights: BuzzFeed News' "The 19 Best Horror Films of 2018", LA Weekly's "The Ten Best Horror Movies of 2018", Thrillist's "The Best Horror Movies of 2018", Esquire's "The Scariest Movies of 2018", Dread Central's "Josh Millican's Best Horror Movies of 2018", Horror News Network Top 18 Horror Films of 2018, The Ringer's "The 10 Best Horror Movies of 2018", and PopHorror's "Top 25 Favorite Horror Movies of 2018" (8/25). It is listed as one of Rotten Tomatoes' "Best Horror Movies of 2018" and "140 Best 2010s Horror Movies".

Four years after its release, /Film suggests its dark tonal shift helps "distinguish itself from sundry other nostalgic horror rides".

Summer of 84 was horror streaming platform Shudder's second biggest film premiere of 2018, trailing only Mandy. It was nominated for a 2019 Saturn Award for Best Independent Film Release. The film poster was included as one of Rotten Tomatoes' "24 Best Movie Posters of 2018".
