= Up Here (TV series) =

Musical romantic comedy television series

- Genre: Musical; Romantic comedy
- Based on: Up Here by: Kristen Anderson-Lopez; Robert Lopez
- Developed by: Steven Levenson; Kristen Anderson-Lopez; Robert Lopez; Danielle Sanchez-Witzel
- Starring: Mae Whitman; Carlos Valdes; Katie Finneran; John Hodgman; Andréa Burns; Sophia Hammons; Emilia Suárez
- Country of origin: United States
- Original language: English
- No. of seasons: 1
- No. of episodes: 8

Production
- Executive producers: Steven Levenson; Kristen Anderson-Lopez; Robert Lopez; Danielle Sanchez-Witzel; Jennifer Todd
- Running time: 24–31 minutes
- Production companies: It Takes Two Productions; Old 320 Sycamore Productions; Pyrrhic Victory Productions; 20th Television

Original release
- Network: Hulu
- Release: March 24, 2023

Up Here is an American musical romantic comedy television series developed by Steven Levenson, Kristen Anderson-Lopez, Robert Lopez, and Danielle Sanchez-Witzel for Hulu that premiered on March 24, 2023. In July 2023, the series was canceled after one season.

== Cast and characters ==
=== Main ===
- Mae Whitman as Lindsay
- Carlos Valdes as Miguel
- Katie Finneran as Joan
- John Hodgman as Tom
- Andréa Burns as Rosie
- Sophia Hammons as Celeste
- Emilia Suárez as Renee

=== Recurring ===
- George Hampe as Ned
- Julia McDermott as Fiona
- Scott Porter as Orson
- Ayumi Patterson as Marta
- Brian Stokes Mitchell as Ted/Mr. McGooch

== Episodes ==
No.	Title	Directed by	Written by	Original release date
1	"Lindsay"	Thomas Kail	Teleplay by : Steven Levenson & Kristen Anderson-Lopez & Robert Lopez & Danielle Sanchez-Witzel	March 24, 2023
Lindsay has been hearing the voices of her parents, and school friend for years. They have always led her to take the safe option. Realising that her impending marriage to Ned, her square fiance, is not what she really wants, she takes an opportunity to leave him and move to New York. Breaking away from her old routines, despite the protestations of her inner voices, she meets Miguel, who has his own set of voices to contend with.
2	"Miguel"	Thomas Kail	Teleplay by : Steven Levenson & Kristen Anderson-Lopez & Robert Lopez & Danielle Sanchez-Witzel	March 24, 2023
3	"Signs"	Kimmy Gatewood	Berkley Johnson	March 24, 2023
4	"Special"	Kimmy Gatewood	Evangeline Ordaz	March 24, 2023
5	"Labels"	Chioke Nassor	Kate Gersten	March 24, 2023
6	"Armor"	Chioke Nassor	Courtney Perdue & Baindu Saidu	March 24, 2023
7	"Baggage"	Rachel Raimist	Sam Sklaver	March 24, 2023
8	"Y2K"	Rachel Raimist	Noah Diaz & Steven Levenson	March 24, 2023

== Production ==
=== Development ===
The series was based on the stage musical of the same name by Lopez and Anderson-Lopez, which played at the La Jolla Playhouse in 2015. The series was first announced in January 2022 when Hulu gave the project a series order. Steven Levenson, Kristen Anderson-Lopez, Robert Lopez, and Danielle Sanchez-Witzel were set as writers and executive producers. On July 28, 2023, Hulu canceled the series after one season.

=== Casting ===
Mae Whitman was cast in March 2022, and Carlos Valdes was cast in June. Later that month, Katie Finneran, John Hodgman, Andréa Burns, Sophia Hammons, and Emilia Suárez were cast as series regulars, along with George Hampe, Julia McDermott, Scott Porter, Ayumi Patterson, and Brian Stokes Mitchell in recurring roles.

== Release ==
All eight episodes were released on Hulu, and internationally on Disney+ (via Star) and Star+ in the Latin America, on March 24, 2023.

== Soundtrack ==
All tracks are written by Kristen Anderson-Lopez & Robert Lopez.

Up Here (Original Series Soundtrack)
No.	Title	Length
1.	"Can I Ever Know You? (Main Title)"	0:44
2.	"To Really Know Someone"	2:53
3.	"What If?"	3:42
4.	"Tiger Shark"	3:04
5.	"Smart Smart Smart Smart Baby"	0:36
6.	"You Don't Belong"	0:25
7.	"Who Am I and Who Are You?"	3:06
8.	"It's a Sign!"	2:33
9.	"Chapter Two"	2:12
10.	"I Am Not Alone"	2:51
11.	"So Many Ways"	2:47
12.	"You Gotta Be You"	2:53
13.	"I Feel Like I've Always Known You (Wedding)"	2:48
14.	"I Feel Like I've Always Known You (Woods)"	2:21
15.	"Falling in Love"	2:15
16.	"The Quest"	3:27
17.	"Please Like Me"	2:37
18.	"The Truth Is"	3:00
19.	"A Christmas Prayer"	3:20
20.	"Can I Ever Know You? (Finale)"	2:48
21.	"Falling in Love (Bonus Version)"	2:12
Total length:		52:00

== Reception ==
The review aggregator website Rotten Tomatoes reported a 53% approval rating with an average rating of 6.2/10, based on 17 critic reviews. The website's critics consensus reads, "Mae Whitman and Carlos Valdes are a likable enough pair, but Up Here is let down by a thin story that knocks its melody off-key." Metacritic, which uses a weighted average, assigned a score of 53 out of 100 based on 6 critics, indicating "mixed or average reviews".
