= Sophia Hammons =

American actress

- Hammonds at Freakier Friday premiere 2025
- Born: November 16, 2006 (age 19); South Pasadena, California, U.S.
- Occupation: Actress
- Years active: 2018–present

Sophia Hammons (born November 16, 2006) is an American actress. She rose to fame for playing Amy in the Disney Channel Original Movies Under Wraps (2021) and its sequel Under Wraps 2, and gained further recognition for playing Lily Reyes in Freakier Friday (2025), which marked her feature film debut.

== Early life ==
Hammons was born in South Pasadena, California, and moved to Boulder, Colorado, at the age of six.

== Career ==
Hammons starred as Amy in the Disney Channel films Under Wraps & Under Wraps 2 and as Celeste in the Hulu original Up Here. Hammons appeared in the Netflix docudrama The Social Dilemma, in which she played the phone-obsessed girl Isla alongside Skyler Gisondo and Kara Hayward. The film premiered at Sundance and was nominated for seven Emmy Awards. It was announced in June 2024 that Hammons would be starring in the 2025 film Freakier Friday with Jamie Lee Curtis and Lindsay Lohan. In an interview in Glamour magazine published online on August 9, 2025, the day after Freakier Friday was released in the United States, Hammons described the thrill of playing the role of Lily Reyes –like Hammons, the daughter of a single dad (played in the film by Manny Jacinto) – against Julia Butters' Harper Coleman, daughter of Anna (Lindsay Lohan), as a "full-circle moment," given her childhood fandom of Freaky Friday, and said that she and Butters "clicked instantly" on set.

== Filmography ==
=== Film ===
Year	Title	Role	Notes
2018	Lemonade	Iris	Short film
2019	The Divisible	Girl on Beach	Short film
2019	Extra Ordinary	Harley	Short film
2020	The Social Dilemma	Isla	
2020	Rumor	Rumor Johnson	Short film
2023	The Absence of Eden	Alma	
2025	Freakier Friday	Lily Reyes / Tess Coleman	
TBA	No Place for Young Girls †	Sophia	Short film; completed

=== Television ===
Year	Title	Role	Notes
2018	Dirt	Winnie Tiller	Television short film
2021	Under Wraps	Amy	Television film
2022	Under Wraps 2	Amy	Television film
2023	Up Here	Celeste	Main role
