= Deck the Halls (2006 film) =

American Christmas comedy film

- Theatrical release poster
- Directed by: John Whitesell
- Written by: Matt Corman; Chris Ord; Don Rhymer
- Produced by: Arnon Milchan; Michael Costigan; John Whitesell
- Starring: Danny DeVito; Matthew Broderick; Kristin Davis; Kristin Chenoweth
- Cinematography: Mark Irwin
- Edited by: Paul Hirsch
- Music by: George S. Clinton
- Production companies: Regency Enterprises; New Regency
- Distributed by: 20th Century Fox
- Release date: November 22, 2006
- Running time: 93 minutes
- Country: United States
- Language: English
- Budget: $51 million
- Box office: $47.2 million

Deck the Halls is a 2006 American Christmas comedy film directed by John Whitesell, written by Matt Corman, Chris Ord, and Don Rhymer, and starring Danny DeVito, Matthew Broderick, Kristin Davis, and Kristin Chenoweth. It tells the story of an optometrist who ends up in a Christmas competition with his new neighbor. The film was released in theaters by 20th Century Fox on November 22, 2006. It was a critical and commercial failure, grossing $47.2 million against a $51 million budget.

== Plot ==
In the fictional town of Cloverdale, Massachusetts, optometrist and self-proclaimed Christmas expert Steve Finch wants his family, consisting of wife Kelly, daughter Madison, and son Carter, to have a great Christmas, filled with traditions such as using an Advent calendar, taking Christmas card pictures in matching sweaters, and buying a large Christmas tree.

In the middle of the night on December 1, new neighbors move in across the street: car salesman and electrical engineer Buddy Hall and his trophy wife Tia, both of whom Steve and Kelly meet the next morning. Later that day, Kelly goes with Madison and Carter to the Hall house, where they meet the Halls’ teenage twin daughters, Ashley and Emily. Tia and Kelly immediately become friends, as do Ashley, Emily, and Madison.

Buddy goes to work as a used car salesman, where he sells a car to the owner of the dealership, giving him a promotion. That night, Tia complains to him that while he can sell anything he soon gets bored. She is fed up with always moving on, to which Buddy responds he wants to achieve something greater than selling cars or copiers.

After discovering that the neighborhood can be seen on satellite photos, but that his house is not visible, Buddy decides to make it visible using Christmas lights. As his display grows bigger, including live animals, it gets him known around town, angering Steve and threatening his position as the neighborhood's “Christmas guy.”

Steve's envy towards Buddy increases; in various incidents, Steve's Christmas card photo is ruined when two of Buddy's phonophobic feral horses get startled by the sleigh bells and take Steve for a wild ride which ends with him falling into a frozen lake, his car doors are ripped off during one of Buddy's extravagant light shows, and his private Christmas tree lot is burned down when Buddy accidentally spills gasoline with his chainsaw.

Eventually, Buddy's house is completely lit, and even synchronized to music. Steve manages to sabotage his lights by shorting the fuse box with snowballs, but a backup generator foils his plan. Buddy discovers the sabotage and retaliates by stealing the town's Christmas tree, putting it in Steve's house, and "buying" him a car.

Buddy and Steve make a bet: if Steve beats him in the WinterFest speedskating race, then Buddy removes the lights, and if Buddy wins, Steve pays for the car. When Buddy wins, Steve yells at him, calling him a nobody as his house is still not visible from space.

Hurt, Buddy compensates by buying a huge amount of programmable LED lights. He pays for by hocking Tia's valuable heirloom vase, so she and the girls depart. Buddy's obsession with decorating his house also causes him to lose his job.

Having had enough, Steve buys various fireworks including the "Atomic Warlord", a large, illegal, military-grade rocket from a gangster and tries to destroy the Hall house. The rocket misfires, setting the town Christmas tree on fire, so Steve's family leaves, but not before Kelly scolds Steve for ignoring his children to focus on Buddy.

Steve discovers Buddy has been stealing his power for the lights. However, after seeing him taking down his lights, a remorseful Steve forgives him. The two forget their rivalry and build a winter wonderland with all of Buddy's lights. They lure Tia, Kelly, and the kids home and all sit down to an elaborate Christmas dinner made by both men, where they reconcile.

Soon, the whole town arrives at Buddy's house to help put his lights back up, in time for a story about them on MTV. At first, the lights fail, so everyone sings "O Holy Night" and uses their cell phones as flashlights. As they sing, Steve accepts Buddy's offer to be his friend, and Carter notices that the lights did not work because one of the plugs was not plugged in properly. He tightens the plug, causing the lights to shine brightly through the night. SuChin Pak, doing the MTV report, gets confirmation from MyEarth that Buddy's house is indeed visible from space, and the crowd celebrates.

== Cast ==
- Danny DeVito as Buddy Hall
- Matthew Broderick as Dr. Steve Finch
- Kristin Davis as Kelly Finch
- Kristin Chenoweth as Tia Hall
- Alia Shawkat as Madison Finch
- Dylan Blue as Carter Finch
- Jorge Garcia as Wallace
- Fred Armisen as Gustave
- Gillian Vigman as Gerta
- Ryan Devlin as Bob Murray
- Kelly Aldridge as Ashley Hall
- Sabrina Aldridge as Emily Hall
- Lochlyn Munro as Ted Beckham
- Sean O'Bryan as Mayor Young
- Jackie Burroughs as Mrs. Ryor
- Garry Chalk as Sheriff Dave
- Nicola Peltz as Mackenzie
- Kal Penn as Amit Sayid, Director of Infosystems Tech, MyEarth
- Cory Monteith as Madison's Date
- Zak Santiago as Fireworks Dealer
- Jill Krop as herself
- SuChin Pak as herself

== Production ==
=== Filming ===
The film was originally entitled All Lit Up, and while it was set in the United States, it was shot in Cloverdale, Surrey, Ocean Park, Surrey, and other locations throughout Metro Vancouver.

In the scene in which Steve and Buddy are in a speedskating race, Matthew Broderick had to train with a real Olympic speed skater trainer for a few weeks before he could film that scene. He trained at Chelsea Piers in New York.

== Reception ==
=== Box office ===
The film grossed $35.1 million in North America and $12.1 million in other territories for a total of $47.2 million, against a budget of $51 million, making it a box office failure where it only earned back 91.8% of its total budget.

The film grossed $12 million in its opening weekend, finishing fourth at the box office.

=== Critical response ===
On the review aggregator website Rotten Tomatoes, 6% of 85 critics' reviews are positive, with an average rating of 3/10. The website's consensus reads: "Relying on flat humor and a preposterous plot, Deck the Halls is an unnecessarily mean-spirited holiday movie that does little to put viewers in a holiday mood." This was the third-worst reviewed Christmas movie on the site, after The Nutcracker in 3D and Christmas with the Kranks, respectively. Metacritic, which uses a weighted average, assigned the film a score of 28 out of 100, based on 22 critics, indicating "generally unfavorable" reviews. Audiences polled by CinemaScore gave the film an average grade of "B−" on an A+ to F scale.

Roger Moore of the Orlando Sentinel named it "A leaden slice of fruitcake, with about as much nutritional value," and concluding that "it's not worth working up a good hate over". Stephen Hunter remarked "I literally didn't count a single laugh in the whole aimless schlep," and suggested that the film should have been named Dreck the Halls instead. Michael Medved named it the "Worst Movie of 2006." Finally, Richard Roeper, co-host of the television show Ebert & Roeper, wrote:

"You can't believe how excruciatingly awful this movie is. It is bad in a way that will cause unfortunate viewers to huddle in the lobby afterward, hugging in small groups, consoling one another with the knowledge that it's over, it's over -- thank God, it's over. [...] Compared to the honest hard labor performed by tens of millions of Americans every day, a film critic's job is like a winning lottery ticket. But there IS work involved, and it can be painful -- and the next time someone tells me I have the best job in the world, I'm going to grab them by the ear, fourth-grade-teacher-in-1966-style, and drag them to see Deck the Halls."

== Accolades ==
The film was nominated for three Golden Raspberry Awards:

- Worst Excuse For Family Entertainment
- Worst Supporting Actor (Danny DeVito)
- Worst Supporting Actress (Kristin Chenoweth).

== See also ==
- List of Christmas films
