= Adam Wylie =

American actor (born 1984)

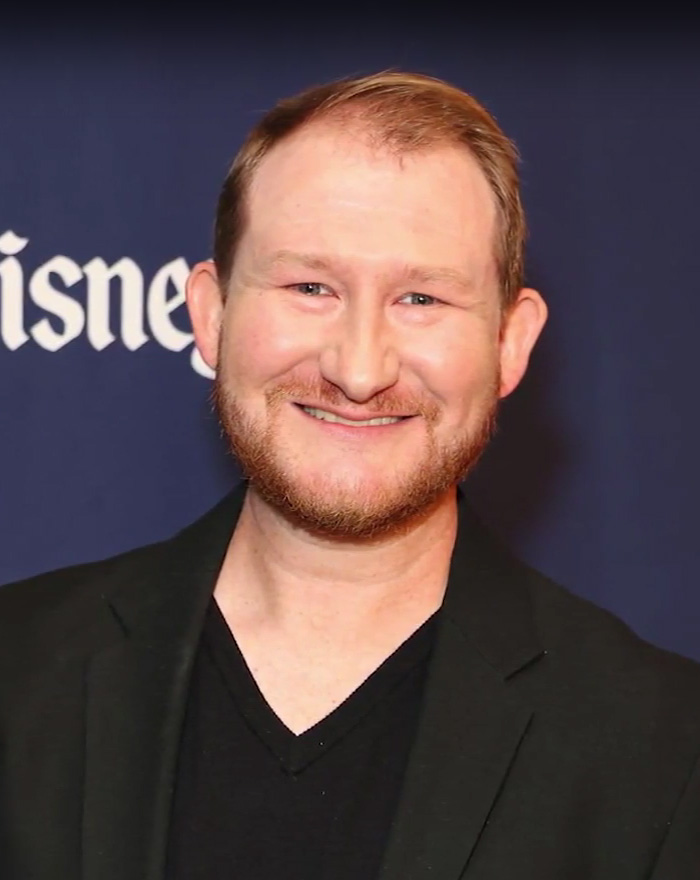
- Wylie in 2022
- Born: Adam Augustus Wylie; May 23, 1984 (age 42); San Dimas, California, U.S.
- Occupations: Actor; magician; spokesman
- Years active: 1989–present
- Spouse: Sophie Ullett (m. 2017)

Adam Augustus Wylie (born May 23, 1984) is an American actor, magician and a former Crayola spokesman. He played Zack Brock, the youngest son of Doctor and Sheriff Brock's children, on Picket Fences from 1992 to 1996. Wylie is also a voice actor; his voice roles include Brainiac 5 in Legion of Super Heroes (2006–2008), Pierce Wheels in the Ben 10 franchise (2008–2011), and Peter Pan in Jake and the Never Land Pirates (2012–2015).

== Early life ==
Adam Augustus Wylie was born on May 23, 1984, in San Dimas, California, the son of Karen and Leonard Wylie. He is one of five children, including brothers Eric, Ben, Aaron, and sister, Tai. He started his acting career at the age of four in a candy commercial. He attended Upland Christian Schools in Upland, California and Condit Elementary in Claremont, California.

== Career ==
=== Voice-over work ===
By the age of nine, Wylie was busy with voice-over work, including the voice of young Prince Derek in The Swan Princess (1994), and David in All Dogs Go to Heaven 2 (1996). He then lent his voice to many animated series, including Dennis the Menace as the title character (1993–94), Hey Arnold! as Curly (1996–2002), Crayola Kids Adventures, Napoleon as the title character (1997), The King and I (1999) as Louis Leonowens, and Walt Disney Television Animation's pilot Kitty's Dish (as Josh). Wylie's voice credits also include Batman Beyond, Pepper Ann as Crash, As Told By Ginger as Ian Richton, Midnight Club II, Jimmy Olsen in the 2007 direct-to-DVD film, Superman: Doomsday, the roles of Fred Nerk, Nigel Thrall and Bananas B on American Dragon: Jake Long, Avatar: The Last Airbender, Ben 10, and the character Justin in The Easter StoryKeepers.

He also starred as Mike Fowler in Focus on the Family's The Last Chance Detectives audio cases (2004).

Wylie also starred as the voice of Brainiac 5 and Colossal Boy in the animated series Legion of Super Heroes and the voice of Ulraj in The Secret Saturdays.

Wylie voiced the lead role in Sir Malcolm and the Missing Prince, the first series in Lamplighter Publishing's new radio drama Lamplighter Theatre. This radio drama is a two-hour production.

He also voices Ryan Cummings in the popular Christian audio drama series Adventures in Odyssey.

From 2012 to 2013, Wylie voiced Tritannus, the main antagonist in the fifth season of Winx Club.

=== Television and film work ===
In 1993, Wylie voiced Timmy and Chris in the Christmas film Precious Moments: Timmy's Special Delivery. In 1994, he did one of the characters on the Easter film Precious Moments: Simon the Lamb. Wylie first became widely known as Zack Brock, the youngest of Sheriff Brock's three children in the television series Picket Fences from 1992 to 1996. This was followed by appearances in many other television programs, including as a series regular in Love and Marriage as Max, Ed as David Mirsky (2001), and Gilmore Girls as Brad Langford (2001–2003), he played Garfield in The Biggest Fan (2002) and as a guest star in 7th Heaven as Marvin, Sliders as Trevor, Touched by an Angel as Andy Erskine, Judging Amy as Nicholas Binkow, MTV Undressed as Owen, Entourage, Living Single, Monk, CSI: Miami, and Veronica Mars.

Wylie was cast as Garfield (Debbie Warden's older brother) in the Dream Street film The Biggest Fan.

Wylie also appeared in the television films Under Wraps as Gilbert, Out on a Limb, Balloon Farm as Charles, and Michael Landon, the Father I Knew as the best friend to the television star's teenage son.

Wylie's first motion picture appearance was in Child's Play 2 (1990), which was followed by roles in films including Kindergarten Cop as Larry (1990), Santa With Muscles (1996), Children of the Corn V: Fields of Terror as Ezekial (1998), Breaking Free as Billy (1995), Cutaway as Cal (2000), Can of Worms as Nick (1999), Flying Virus as Adam (2001), Daybreak as Newton Warner (2001), Rebound (2005), and American Pie Presents: Band Camp as Guy (2005). He also starred in several Crayola Kids' Club-produced films.

Wylie played Mikey in the 2009 skateboarding film Street Dreams.

In 2009, Wylie was seen performing card tricks and coin tricks on the syndicated magic show Masters of Illusion.

In 2010 he had a small part as a cop opposite Kelly Monaco's character Sam McCall on General Hospital.

Also in 2012, Wylie guest starred as Andy the Android on Disney Channel's Shake It Up: Made in Japan.

=== Musical theatre ===
In 2002, Wylie appeared as Jack in Stephen Sondheim's Tony Award-winning revival of Into the Woods on Broadway. His role in Into the Woods was meta-referenced on Gilmore Girls as being done by his character in that series, Brad Langford.

He has also appeared frequently in regional theatre, including in Camelot as Merlyn-Tom-Morgan at the North Shore Music Theatre (Massachusetts) in 2005, Big River as Huck Finn, 110 in the Shade as Jimmy Curry in 2004 at the Pasadena Playhouse (California), On the Town as Chip in 2003 at the Gateway Playhouse, Bellport, New York, Footloose as Willard, Precious Sons as Freddie Jr., House Arrest as Todd, and Beauty and the Beast, as Chip. He also played Leo Bloom in a regional production of The Producers at Gateway Playhouse.

February 21, 2007, marked Wylie's debut in the musical Wicked at the Pantages Theatre, Los Angeles. He starred as Boq opposite such stars as Eden Espinosa, Jenna Leigh Green, Megan Hilty, and Carol Kane. He played his final performance on December 30, 2007, along with Espinosa and Kane, and was replaced by understudy Michael Drolet.

== Personal life ==
On June 24, 2017, Wylie married Sophie Ullett. He currently resides in Valley Village, Los Angeles, California.

On October 20, 2023, Wylie was arrested on charges of petty theft after allegedly shoplifting from a Target store in Burbank, California, taking $108.05 worth of products. He was given a citation and subsequently released.

== Honors and awards ==
Wylie won Young Artist Awards for Picket Fences, and Dennis the Menace, and Hollywood Reporter YoungStar Awards for Picket Fences twice. He has been nominated for Young Artist Awards for Under Wraps and All Dogs Go to Heaven 2, and YoungStar Awards for Balloon Farm and Michael Landon, The Father I Knew.

== Filmography ==
=== Film ===
Year	Title	Role	Notes
1990	Child's Play 2	Sammy	
1990	Kindergarten Cop	Larry	
1991	The Doctor	Joey	
1992	Out on a Limb	Bob	
1993	Reckless Kelly	Pop Corn Boy	
1994	Pom Poko		Voice, English dub
1994	The Swan Princess	Young Prince Derek	Voice Nominated – Young Artist Award for Best Performance by a Young Actor in a Voiceover – TV or Movie
1995	Napoleon	Napoleon	Voice, American dub
1995	Breaking Free	Billy Rankin	
1996	All Dogs Go to Heaven 2	David	Voice Nominated – Young Artist Award for Best Performance in a Voiceover – Young Artist
1996	Santa with Muscles	Taylor	
1997	Crayola Kids Adventures: 20,000 Leagues Under the Sea	Captain Nemo	
1997	The Ugly Duckling	Young Ugly	Voice
1998	Children of the Corn V: Fields of Terror	Ezekial	Direct-to-video
1998	Sandman	Easter Bunny	
1999	The King and I	Louis Leonowens	Voice Nominated – YoungStar Award for Best Performance in a Voice Over Talent
2000	Cutaway	Cal	Television film
2000	Lost in the Pershing Point Hotel	Duane Striker	
2000	Day Break	Newton Warner	
2001	Flying Virus	Adam	
2002	The Biggest Fan	Garfield	
2004	Wild Roomies	Mr. Asher	
2005	American Pie Presents: Band Camp	Trading Card Bandy	Direct-to-video
2006	Bratz: Genie Magic	Bryce	Voice
2007	Superman: Doomsday	Jimmy Olsen	Voice, direct-to-video
2008	Return to Sleepaway Camp	Weed	Direct-to-video
2009	Porky's Pimpin' Pee Wee	Pee Wee	
2009	Street Dreams	Mikey Robbins	
2011	1320	Little Jim	
2013	Dark Powers	Neil Roberts	
2013	The Smurfs 2	Panicky Smurf	Voice
2013	'Til Morning	Mr. Smee	
2019	The Addams Family	ADR Looper	
2020	The Big Ugly	Additional voices	Voice
2021	The Mitchells vs. the Machines	Additional voices	Voice

=== Television ===
Year	Title	Role	Notes
1990	Empty Nest	Boy	Episode: "Everything But Love"
1991	Who's the Boss?	Child	Episode: "Tony and the Princess"
1991	Home Improvement	Jimmy Wagner	Episode: "Wild Kingdom"
1991	Seinfeld	The Kid	Episode: "The Parking Garage"
1992	The Torkelsons	Young Kirby	Episode: "Say Uncle"
1993	The Adventures of Brisco County, Jr.	Charlie Sims	Episode: "Pirates!" Won Young Artist Award for Best Youth Actor Guest Starring in a Television Show
1993	All-New Dennis the Menace	Dennis Mitchell	Voice, main role Won Young Artist Award for Best Youth Actor in a Voiceover Role – TV or Movie
1993	Timmy's Special Delivery: A Precious Moments Christmas	Timmy, Chris	Television special
1995	The Crew		Episode: "Bar Mitzvah Boy"
1996	Boy Meets World	Robert	Episode: "New Friends and Old"
1996	Weird Science	Trevor	Episode: "Grumpy Old Genie"
1996	Phantom 2040	Hamid	Episode: "The Second Time Around"
1996	Murder, She Wrote	Boy	Episode: "Southern Double-Cross"
1992–1996	Picket Fences	Zachary Brock	Main role, 87 episodes Won:Young Artist Award for Best Youth Actor Recurring or Regular in a TV Series YoungStar Award for Best Young Actor in a Drama TV Series Nominated: Young Artist Award for Best Performance by a Youth Actor in a Drama Series Young Artist Award for Outstanding Youth Ensemble in a Television Series (shared with Holly Marie Combs and Justin Shenkarow) Screen Actors Guild Award for Outstanding Performance by an Ensemble in a Drama Series (shared with Kathy Baker, Don Cheadle, Holly Marie Combs, Kelly Connell, Robert O. Cornthwaite, Fyvush Finkel, Lauren Holly, Costas Mandylor, Justin Shenkarow, Tom Skerritt, Leigh Taylor-Young and Ray Walston) Screen Actors Guild Award for Outstanding Performance by an Ensemble in a Drama Series (shared with Amy Aquino, Kathy Baker, Don Cheadle, Kelly Connell, Fyvush Finkel, Lauren Holly, Costas Mandylor, Marlee Matlin, Justin Shenkarow, Tom Skerritt, and Ray Walston)
1996	Love and Marriage	Max Begg	Episode: "Pilot"
1996	Gargoyles	Matthew	Voice, episode: "A Bronx Tail"
1996	Jungle Cubs	Mungo	Voice, episode: "Mondo Mungo"
1997	Sliders	Trevor	Episode: "Murder Most Foul"
1997	Living Single	Curly	Episode: "The Clown That Roared"
1997	High Incident	Timmy Martin	Episode: "Knock, Knock"
1997	Adventures from the Book of Virtues	Courtier, Croseus	Voice, episode: "Humility"
1998	Beyond Belief: Fact or Fiction	Anthony Shaw	Episode: "The Wall, The Chalkboard, The Getaway, The Prescription & Summer Camp"
1998	Touched by an Angel	Andy Erskine	Episode: "Doodlebugs"
1998	Pensacola: Wings of Gold	Casey Hunt	Episode: "We Are Not Alone"
1998	Kelly Kelly	Kid #1	Episode: "Junior Firefighters"
1998	7th Heaven	Marvin	Episode: "... And a Nice Chianti"
1999	Chicken Soup for the Soul	Nate	Episode: "Blind Date with Belinda"
1999	Walker, Texas Ranger	Thomas	Episode: "Rise to the Occasion"
2000	The Wild Thornberrys	Todd	Voice, episode: "Luck Be an Aye-Aye"
2000	Undressed	Owen	3 episodes
2000	Movie Stars	Smithers	Episode: "The Seduction of Reese Hardin"
2000	Batman Beyond	Kenny Stanton, Boy	Voice, 2 episodes
1999–2000	Pepper Ann	Crash	Voice, 3 episodes
2001	Kate Brasher	Sincere Boy	Episode: "Simon"
2001	18 Wheels of Justice	Matthew	Episode: "A Place Called Defiance"
2001	Spin City	Kid	Episode: "A Shot in the Dark: Part 1"
2001	The Huntress	Zack	Episode: "The Quest: Part 2"
2001	Dead Last	Buzz	Episode: "Death is in the Air"
2001	Ed	David Mirsky	2 episodes
2001	Oh Yeah! Cartoons	Floyd	Voice, episode: "The Boy Who Cried Alien"
2000–2001	As Told by Ginger	Ian Richton	Voice, 4 episodes
2002	Judging Amy	Nicholas Binkow	Episode: "The Cook of the Money Pot"
2002	So Little Time	Todd	Episode: "Riley's New Guy"
2002	The Division	Rory Kyle	Episode: "A Priori"
1996–2002	Hey Arnold!	Thaddeus "Curly" Gammelthorpe	Voice, 13 episodes
2001–2003	Gilmore Girls	Brad Langford	6 episodes
2003	Fillmore!	Winston Cotter, Geek Brute #1	Voice, 2 episodes
2004	Switched!	Himself	Episode: "Adam and Julia"
2004	NCIS	Darin Spotnitz	Episode: "The Truth is Out There"
2004	Malcolm in the Middle	Scott	Episode: "Victor's Other Family"
2004	Veronica Mars	Grant Winters	Episode: "The Wrath of Con"
2005	Monk	Pet Store Owner	Episode: "Mr. Monk and the Red Herring"
2005	Joan of Arcadia	Skinny Kid God	Episode: "Trial and Error"
2005	The Life and Times of Juniper Lee	Deputy Minion, Zombie #1	Voice, episode: "I've Got My Mind on My Mummy and My Mummy on My Mind"
2006	Zoey 101	Dorm Advisor	Episode: "Girls Will Be Boys"
2006	Avatar: The Last Airbender	Academy Student	Voice, episode: "The Blind Bandit"
2006	Entourage	Jay	Episode: "One Day in the Valley"
2006	Finley the Fire Engine	Miguel	Voice
2005–2007	American Dragon: Jake Long	Fred, Nigel Thrall	Voice, 7 episodes
2007	The Boondocks	Theater Employee #1	Voice, episode: "...Or Die Trying"
2005–2008	Ben 10	J.T., young Max Tennyson, Nerdy Kid #4	Voice, 5 episodes
2006–2008	Legion of Super Heroes	Brainiac 5	Voice, main cast
2008	Masters of Illusion: Impossible Magic	Himself	TV series
2008	Numb3rs	Oliver Mayo	Episode: "Frienemies"
2009	Terminator: The Sarah Connor Chronicles	Henry Douglas Jr.	Episode: "Desert Cantos"
2009	Life	Pete Magnus	Episode: "Shelf Life"
2008–2010	The Secret Saturdays	Ulraj	Voice, 4 episodes
2010	General Hospital	Officer Church	Season 28 (episode 11986)
2010	Phineas and Ferb		Voice, 2 episodes
2010	CSI: Miami	Teddy Enwald	Episode: "Getting Axed"
2008–2010	Ben 10: Alien Force	Pierce Wheels	Voice, 5 episodes
2011	Ben 10: Ultimate Alien	Pierce Wheels	Voice, episode: "The Purge"
2012	The Rules of Unemployment	Adam	TV series short
2012	Robot and Monster	Fuzzy Slippers	Voice, episode: "Apartment 3 1/2"
2013	Dark Things	Reggie	Episode: "Guilt"
2013	Anger Management	Winger	Episode: "Charlie and the Airport Sext"
2012–2013	Winx Club	Tritannus	Voice, 23 episodes
2012–2016	Jake and the Never Land Pirates	Peter Pan	Voice, 8 episodes
2013	Mad	General Zod	Voice, episode: "MAD's 100th Episode Special"
2014	He Don't Got Game	Austin	
2014	Perception	Tyler Woolf	Episode: "Obsession"
2015	Castle	Ronny	Episode: "Private Eye Caramba"
2021	Lucifer	Short Magician	Episode: "Nothing Ever Changes Around Here"
2021	Arcane	Additional voices	Voice, episode: "Welcome to the Playground"
2023	Adventures in Odyssey	Ryan Cummings	Voice, 2 episodes

=== Television films ===
Year	Title	Role	Notes
1990	Without Her Consent	Loren	Television film (NBC)
1992	Stepfather III	Easter Party Boy	
1993	Timmy's Special Delivery: A Precious Moments Christmas	Additional voices	
1997	Under Wraps	Gilbert	Disney Channel Original Movie Nominated – Young Artist Award for Best Performance in a TV Movie or Feature Film – Young Ensemble (shared with Mario Yedidia and Clara Bryant)
1999	Balloon Farm	Charles	Part of The Wonderful World of Disney series Nominated – YoungStar Award for Best Young Actor in a Mini-Series/Made for TV Film
1999	Can of Worms	Nick	Disney Channel Original Movie
1999	Michael Landon, the Father I Knew	Teenage Jack	Television film (CBS) Nominated – YoungStar Award for Best Young Actor in a Mini-Series/Made for TV Film
2000	Cutaway	Cal	
2004	Tales of a Fly on the Wall	Bud	
2005	Kitty's Dish	Josh	Voice
2007	Species: The Awakening	Jared	Television film (Syfy); uncredited
2012	Ben 10: Destroy All Aliens	J.T.	Voice
2015	Up in Smoke	El Chupacabra	
2023	Under Wraps 2	Bueller	

=== Theatre ===
Year	Title	Role	Notes
1995	Beauty and the Beast	Chip Potts	
2002	Into the Woods	Jack	Ahmanson Theatre
2002	Into the Woods	Jack	Broadway
2003	On the Town	Chip	
2004	110 in the Shade	Jimmy Curry	
2005	Camelot	Merlyn-Tom-Morgan	
2007	Wicked	Boq	Pantages Theatre
2008	The Producers	Leo Bloom	

=== Other appearances ===
Year	Title	Role	Notes
1996	Goosebumps: Escape from Horrorland	Luke	Voice; video game
1996	Dot and Spot's Magical Christmas Adventure	Ryan	Voice; video short
1997	Adventures in Odyssey: In Harm's Way	Doug Harding	Voice; video short
1997	Sitting in Limbo	Joey Viola	Short film
1997	Crayola Kids Adventures: The Trojan Horse	Odysseus	Film; video special
1997	Crayola Kids Adventures: Tales of Gulliver's Travels	Gulliver	Film; video special
1997	Crayola Kids Adventures: 20,000 Leagues Under the Sea	Captain Nemo	Film; video special
1997	The Easter Story Keepers	Justin	Film; voice; video special
1999	Pirates 4-D	Davie	Short film
1999	Our Friend, Martin	Sam Dale	Film; voice; video special
2003	Midnight Club II	Angel	Voice; video game
2005	Tony Hawk's American Wasteland	Ian	Voice; video game
2006	Toot & Puddle: I'll Be Home for Christmas	Puddle	Film; voice; video special
2008	Booth Girls	Wil, Convention Worker	Short film
2013	The Smurfs: The Legend of Smurfy Hollow	Panicky Smurf	Short film; voice
2014	WildStar	Arwick Redleaf, Freebot	Voice; video game
