= Under Wraps (2021 film) =

Remake of the 1997 film of the same name

- Promotional artwork
- Genre: Family horror; Teen horror
- Based on: Under Wraps by Don Rhymer
- Written by: Alex Zamm; William Robertson
- Directed by: Alex Zamm
- Starring: Malachi Barton; Christian J. Simon; Sophia Hammons; Phil Wright
- Music by: Jamie Christopherson; Oleksa Lozowchuk
- Country of origin: United States
- Original language: English

Production
- Executive producers: Todd Y. Murata; Fernando Szew
- Producers: Jameson Parker; Todd Y. Murata
- Cinematography: Bobby Lam
- Editor: Alison Grace
- Running time: 91 minutes
- Production companies: MarVista Entertainment; Brightlight Pictures

Original release
- Network: Disney Channel
- Release: October 1, 2021

Related
- Under Wraps (1997); Under Wraps 2 (2022)

Under Wraps is a 2021 American family-teen horror television film directed by Alex Zamm and written by Zamm and William Robertson. Produced by MarVista Entertainment and Brightlight Pictures and a remake of the eponymous 1997 film by Greg Beeman, it premiered as a Disney Channel Original Movie on Disney Channel on October 1, 2021. The film received mixed reviews from critics.

== Plot ==
Twelve-year-old Marshall is a horror movie fanatic while his best friend Gilbert does not share his interests, having walked out of a horror movie called Warthead that they were both seeing. Marshall's divorced mom is seeing a man named Ted that Marshall has trouble adjusting to and his mom wants him to give Ted a chance. Marshall and Gilbert see some people putting a dead body in their creepy neighbor Mr. Kubot's house.

One day, during a field trip to a museum, Marshall and Gilbert are paired up with a new girl in town named Amy, who just moved from a town called Rockport and doesn't like where she is now, and she and Marshall bond over their love of horror movies, much to Gilbert's dismay. While at the museum, they see the Egyptian exhibit and learn a story about a mummy couple being separated and that one of the mummies that was supposed to be there mysteriously disappeared.

Amy learns about the dead body in Mr. Kubot's house and believes that it's the missing mummy. The three sneak inside the house to find the mummy, with Gilbert stumbling across the scarophagus and running away when he finds the mummy, which comes to life and chases the kids around. The mummy winds up giving Marshall back his flashlight that he dropped while running, then the kids have to sneak out when Kubot and his goons come back.

The kids then discover the mummy following them and Marshall has to sneak him into his room while Ted and his mom are watching a movie. He teaches him how to eat pizza and hot sauce, and names him Harold as they start to bond.

Meanwhile, while Marshall is at school, Harold starts wandering around the house and gets scared by technology, causing him to run out of the house and start wandering around town, where he finds the museum where his girlfriend’s sarcophagus is. Marshall, Amy, and Gilbert decide to make a mummy movie with Harold as a school project, but they discover that Harold escaped while they were at school and find him at the museum, where they discover that an amulet that he's wearing brought him to life.

They take him to Marshall and Gilbert's monsterologist friend Buzzy for help on what to do with him, and she finds hieroglyphics on the amulet and decides to translate them. Meanwhile, the kids start to work on their movie, which Ted gives them costumes for. Amy tells Marshall about her divorced dad marrying her stepdad that she didn't like at first, but eventually accepted him, and she tells Marshall to do the same with Ted.

Buzzy successfully translates the amulet, which says that both mummies must be in their sarcophagi by the third day that he came back to life, or he'll turn to dust. They soon discover that Kubot's men took Harold's sarcophagus out of his house. Kubot finds Gilbert's inhaler in his basement, and he discovers that the kids stole Harold, so he and his men confront Harold and the kids, but they manage to escape. Upon realizing that Harold is alive, Kubot feels that he could be worth a lot of money.

Harold and the kids go to their school's Halloween carnival to find Buzzy to get her to drive them to an abandoned ice cream factory, where Harold's sarcophagus is, and Harold starts dancing at the carnival. Meanwhile, Kubot and his men arrive at the carnival and start chasing Gilbert and Harold through the haunted house. Kubot manages to takes the amulet off Harold, turning him back to normal, and he takes off with him, with Buzzy and the kids following them to the ice cream factory.

Kubot and his men deliver Harold to Ravensworth, an art collector, and they show her the amulet bringing Harold to life, which impresses her. The kids arrive at the factory, but Gilbert bails on them out of fear. He later decides to face his fears after talking to an owl.

Marshall, Amy, and Buzzy sneak in, and Buzzy gets chased by Kubot's men. She and Amy get captured and Marshall warns Kubot that Harold will turn to dust if Harold doesn't go back into his coffin, but Kubot won't listen. Gilbert appears, gets the amulet back and throws it back on Harold, who breaks free of his chains and starts attacking the henchmen. Kubot and Ravensworth get knocked out with a trap that Buzzy set. Gilbert admits that he came back because he was really scared about losing his friends and says that he's not scared anymore.

Buzzy and the kids then break into the museum where Harold reunites with his girlfriend, and the kids say goodbye to him as he goes back into his sarcophagus, with Marshall giving him an empty bottle of hot sauce to remember him by.

Meanwhile, the news reports that Harold was delivered to the museum and that Kubot and his goons were arrested. Marshall invites Ted to be in his next movie, having started to accept him. He also tells his mom that they should be together if they're happy together. Amy also decides to stay in town and she, Marshall, and Gilbert all go see Warthead again.

== Cast ==
- Malachi Barton as Marshall
- Christian J. Simon as Gilbert
- Sophia Hammons as Amy
- Phil Wright as Harold
- Melanie Brook as Buzzy
- Brent Stait as Kubot
- Jordana Largy as Diane, Marshall's mother
- Jaime M. Callica as Ted, Diane's boyfriend
- Karin Konoval as Ravensworth

== Production ==
Disney Channel announced its intention to remake its inaugural "Original Movie"-branded film on November 13, 2020, with Christian J. Simon, Malachi Barton, Sophia Hammons and Phil Wright starring and Alex Zamm serving as director and co-writer with William Robertson.

Filming took place at Bridge Studios in Vancouver and its suburbs of New Westminster and Maple Ridge in the Canadian province of British Columbia from November to December 2020. and featured music by Jamie Christopherson and Oleksa Lozowchuk.

== Reception ==
The film was viewed by 401,000 people and 0.09 percent of viewers between the ages of 18 and 49.

Joly Herman of Common Sense Media gave it four out of five stars, emphasizing its diversity, spookiness and comedy. Sarah Musnicky of Nightmarish Conjurings gave the film a positive review. Matthew "Matt" Artz of Halloween Daily News called the film "a quality Disney family viewing with just enough chills to peak kids’ interest in scary stories, plus wholesome laughs, and a positive message, resurrecting a beloved mummy character to inspire courage in his new friends" whiles also commenting that it is ""also loaded with colorful Halloween atmosphere, and features a rousing sequence", "brings all the nostalgia for the generation who grew up watching the original film".

== Release ==
Under Wraps premiered on October 1, 2021, on Disney Channel and was released on October 8, 2021, on Disney+.

== Sequel ==
A sequel to the film, Under Wraps 2, was announced by Disney Branded Television on February 7, 2022, with most of the cast returning and the inclusion of Claude Knowlton and Antonio Cayonne. Filming began on January 17, and wrapped up on March 3, 2022, at Bridge Studios, the exact same location of the previous film. It premiered in Disneyland on September 25, that year and on Disney+ five days later.

== Music ==
China Anne McClain, along with her sisters Lauryn and Sierra McClain, recorded a revamped version of China's 2011 hit song "Calling All the Monsters" from A.N.T. Farm. The re-recorded version featured their brother, Gabriel McClain who is known by his stage name, Messenger. The music video was released on September 30, 2021. The song was released on streaming platforms October 1, 2021 by Walt Disney Records and was featured in the film.

== See also ==
- List of films set around Halloween
- Under Wraps (1997 film)
