= Under Wraps 2 =

- Promotional poster
- Genre: Family horror; Teen horror
- Written by: Josh A. Cagan
- Directed by: Alex Zamm
- Starring: Malachi Barton; Christian J. Simon; Sophia Hammons; Phil Wright; Melanie Brook; Jordan Conley; Rryla McIntosh; T.J. Storm
- Composers: Oleksa Lozowchuk; Jamie Christopherson
- Country of origin: United States
- Original language: English

Production
- Executive producers: Todd Y. Murata; Fernando Szew; Jamie Goehring; Shawn Williamson; Larry Grimaldi; Hannah Pillemer
- Producer: Jameson Parker
- Cinematography: Bobby Lam
- Editor: Kelly Herron
- Running time: 83 minutes
- Production companies: Brightlight Pictures; MarVista Entertainment

Original release
- Network: Disney Channel
- Release: September 25, 2022

Related
- Under Wraps (2021)

Under Wraps 2 is a 2022 American family teen horror Disney Channel Original Movie directed by Alex Zamm and written by Josh A. Cagan, which is a sequel to the 2021 film, Under Wraps. The film stars Malachi Barton, Christian J. Simon, Sophia Hammons, Phil Wright, Melanie Brook, Jordan Conley, Rryla McIntosh, and T.J. Storm. It premiered on September 25, 2022, on Disney Channel.

== Plot ==
One year after meeting Marshall and Gilbert and reuniting Harold the Mummy with his girlfriend, Amy is preparing for her father, Pop's, Halloween-themed wedding to his fiancé, Carl. Meanwhile, a worker at a museum accidentally revives an evil mummy Sobek, who was once Harold's best friend before they were both in love with Rose (whom Amy and Gilbert named Harold's girlfriend after the latter's Aunt Rosie) and Rose chose Harold. Sobek now wants revenge.

Buzzy and the kids arrive at Rockport and meet up with Pop and Carl, and get settled into their hotel. When going to get their rings from the jewelry store, the clerk guy sees a picture of Sobek's amulet and tells them that Sobek may be after Harold and Rose and that the amulet brought him to life.

They go back to the museum and reunite with Harold and Rose by using sunlight on the amulet to bring them to life. Buzzy uses replicas of the mummies to put in their sarcophagi so they can sneak them out of the museum.

Back at the hotel, Marshall orders pizza for him and Harold, and Marshall updates him on his mom and her boyfriend Ted, who are still going strong, and that Gilbert and Amy are making videos for the school paper together, although Marshall admits he is jealous about the amount of time they always spend together.

While Buzzy and the kids are preparing to decorate for the wedding, Amy finds out that Sobek hypnotized a museum worker and they stole an Egyptian scepter and are on their way to Rockport to seek revenge on Harold and Rose, who sneak off to the Halloween carnival. Meanwhile, Sobek and his goons arrive at the museum and discover the fake mummies and decide to go find the real ones at the festival.

Buzzy and the kids find the mummies dancing at the festival, where they encounter Sobek about to attack them with the scepter and they escape in Buzzy's car, but Sobek and his goon wind up with the wedding rings and learn from the jewelry store owner where Amy's dad's wedding is.

Back at the hotel, Amy discovers the rings are missing, which upsets her, but she decides not to worry about it and just enjoy herself at the party. Marshall tells Gilbert and Amy to keep an eye on the mummies at the party. Sobek arrives at the party and causes a mess, taking Rose's amulet and kidnapping her, and attacking Harold when he tries to save her.

Amy gets upset when the party gets ruined and locks herself in her room while confessing to her dad and Carl that she lost the rings. Marshall also gets upset and accuses Gilbert and Amy for not listening to him in the first place about protecting Rose and Harold, who comforts him.

Amy apologizes to her dad for ruining things, and he and Carl tell her they do not need a perfect wedding or rings to get married. Marshall admits he was jealous of Gilbert and Amy spending a lot of time together and they apologize to him for leaving him out. They discover a small Egyptian exhibit in a nearby warehouse and figure that must be where Sobek is.

They arrive at the warehouse and devise a plan to get the amulet and revive Rose. They attack Sobek's goon, tie him up and revive Rose, but Sobek finds them and uses the scepter to revive more mummies to attack Harold, Rose and the kids. Gilbert climbs onto a moon prop and drops it down on the floor, which crushes the mummies. Sobek decides to kill both Harold and Rose if he cannot be with her. The kids use shields to deflect the scepter's attack, which destroys the jewel on the scepter and the amulet, defeating Sobek and breaking the spell put on his goon, whose real name is Larry. Larry gives Amy back the wedding rings and attends the wedding as Buzzy's date.

Amy gives her dads their rings back and the wedding goes on as planned as everyone celebrates, including the mummies. Then Buzzy and the kids take Harold and Rose back to their sarcophagi and say goodbye.

The movie ends with them going out to eat and starting to think about next Halloween, even though Marshall wants to recover from the current Halloween season first.

== Cast ==
- Malachi Barton as Marshall
- Christian J. Simon as Gilbert
- Sophia Hammons as Amy
- Phil Wright as Harold
- Melanie Brook as Buzzy
- Jordan Conley as Larry
- Rryla McIntosh as Rose
- T.J. Storm as Sobek
- Claude Knowlton as Pop
- Antonio Cayonne as Carl
- Adam Wylie as Bueller

== Production ==
=== Development ===
On February 7, 2022, it was announced that Disney Branded Television had ordered a sequel to Under Wraps titled Under Wraps 2. Alex Zamm was set to direct the film, with Josh A. Cagan serving as the writer. Todd Y. Murata and Fernando Stew were set to executive produce the film. The film is produced by MarVista Entertainment. Adam Wylie, who portrayed Gilbert in the original 1997 film, makes a special appearance as Bueller.

=== Casting ===
On March 1, 2022, Claude Knowlton and Antonio Cayonne joined the cast as Pop and Carl, respectively.

=== Filming ===
Filming began on January 17, 2022, at Bridge Studios. It was wrapped on March 3, 2022.

== Music ==
Malachi Barton, Christian J. Simon, and Sophia Hammons recorded the song "My Kind of Monster" from the film. It was released on September 23, 2022, by Walt Disney Records.

== Release ==
Under Wraps 2 premiered on September 25, 2022, on Disney Channel. It was released on September 30, 2022, on Disney+.

== Reception ==
=== Critical response ===
Alex Reif of LaughingPlace described Under Wraps 2 as an entertaining film which depicts an important story dealing with friendship. Melissa Camacho of Common Sense Media gave the film a grade of four out of five stars, complimented the presence of positive messages and role models, citing friendship and critical thinking, and found the movie humorous. Elizabeth Lemieux of Screen Rant named the song "My Kind of Monster" one of the "best Halloween songs" and Under Wraps 2 one of the "best original Halloween movies" of Disney Channel.

=== Accolades ===
Under Wraps 2 was nominated for Best Costume Design in Film Contemporary at the 2023 CAFTCAD Awards.

== See also ==
- List of films set around Halloween
