= Rio 2 =

2014 Blue Sky Studios film

- Theatrical release poster
- Directed by: Carlos Saldanha
- Screenplay by: Don Rhymer; Carlos Kotkin; Jenny Bicks; Yoni Brenner
- Story by: Carlos Saldanha
- Produced by: Bruce Anderson; John C. Donkin
- Starring: Anne Hathaway; Jesse Eisenberg; Jemaine Clement; Kristin Chenoweth; will.i.am; George Lopez; Bruno Mars; Leslie Mann; Rodrigo Santoro; Rita Moreno; Tracy Morgan; Rachel Crow; Jake T. Austin; Andy Garcia; Jamie Foxx; Miguel Ferrer
- Cinematography: Renato Falcão
- Edited by: Harry Hitner
- Music by: John Powell
- Production companies: 20th Century Fox Animation; Blue Sky Studios
- Distributed by: 20th Century Fox
- Release dates: March 20, 2014 (International); April 11, 2014 (United States)
- Running time: 101 minutes
- Country: United States
- Language: English
- Budget: $103–130 million
- Box office: $498.7 million

Rio 2 is a 2014 American animated musical comedy film produced by 20th Century Fox Animation and Blue Sky Studios. The sequel to Rio (2011), it was directed by Carlos Saldanha, and written by Don Rhymer, Carlos Kotkin, Jenny Bicks, and Yoni Brenner. The film features Anne Hathaway, Jesse Eisenberg, Jemaine Clement, Leslie Mann, George Lopez, Jamie Foxx, will.i.am, Tracy Morgan, and Rodrigo Santoro reprising their roles from the first film, with Kristin Chenoweth, Bruno Mars, Rachel Crow, Rita Moreno, Andy Garcia, and Miguel Ferrer joining the cast. Set three years after the events of the first film, it follows Blu, Jewel, and their children leaving Rio for the Amazon rainforest to find other blue macaws, while Nigel the cockatoo pursues Blu to exact revenge.

Rio 2 was released internationally on March 20, 2014, and on April 11 the United States, by 20th Century Fox. The film received mixed reviews from critics and grossed $499 million against a budget of $103–130 million. A third film is in development.

== Plot ==
Three years after the attempted smuggling incident in Rio de Janeiro (Note: As depicted in Rio (2011)), Blu and Jewel raise their three children, Bia, Carla, and Tiago. Meanwhile, Blu's owner Linda and her husband Túlio are on an expedition in the Amazon and, after falling down a waterfall, discover a blue Spix's macaw when a feather floats down towards them. When words about the encounter are broadcast through television, Jewel, who thinks that Carla, Tiago and Bia are becoming too domesticated, believes that they should go to the Amazon to help find the other blue macaws. While the kids are ecstatic, Blu is uncertain but is pressured into going along. Their best friends Rafael, Nico and Pedro also decide to come along to scout talent for Carnival.

Big Boss, the leader of a group of illegal loggers, discovers Linda and Túlio's expedition to find the macaws and orders his henchmen to hunt them down. Meanwhile, Blu and Jewel's old enemy Nigel, who has become flightless, plots to exact revenge on Blu with the help of his new comrades, Charlie an Tamandua and Gabi, a poison dart frog who is in love with him. After arriving at the jungle, Blu, his family and their friends are taken to a flock of blue macaws that hide in an uncharted section of the Amazon. There, Jewel is reunited with her long-lost father, Eduardo, paternal aunt Mimi and childhood friend Roberto. Eduardo seems unimpressed at first with Blu but thanks him for returning Jewel home. Having lost their previous habitat to arson from the loggers, Eduardo distrusts humans, and brushes off Blu's suggestion to expose the sanctuary to Linda and Túlio to ensure their protection.

While searching for the macaws, Linda and Túlio are captured by the loggers. Meanwhile, Blu does his best to fit in with the flock as his family is doing, but his continued reliance on the tools he brought prevents him from connecting with anyone. In another attempt to get closer to him, a disguised Nigel named Bob, wins a talent show to become a performer for a Carnival show that Rafael, Pedro, Nico and Carla are hosting. When Blu tries to pick a Brazilian nut for Jewel, he accidentally puts it in the territory of the Spix macaw's enemies, the scarlet macaws, led by the hostile Felipe. Blu inadvertently causes a war for food between the two tribes when he accidentally swats Felipe with a branch. The war turns out to be a football match, but Blu costs the flock their territory when he accidentally scores on his team's own goal.

After a heated argument with Jewel, Blu decides to leave Linda and his human roots behind him for his family's sake, but after witnessing the loggers' destruction of the forest, he returns and rallies the flock, reconciling with Jewel. With Blu's knowledge of human technology and help from the scarlet macaws, the flock, with the rest of the jungle animals, disable the loggers' machinery. In the chaos, Eduardo encounters a tractor but is rescued by Linda and Túlio. Big Boss tries blowing up the trees with dynamite, but Blu thwarts him. Nigel intervenes, leaving Big Boss to get eaten alive by an anaconda. Wanting Blu to himself, Nigel attacks him. While Gabi tries to help, she accidentally shoots Nigel with a porcupine's quill filled with her poison, but Bia reveals that she is actually a tree frog. An overjoyed Gabi smothers Nigel with affection and drags him away, while Charlie leaves.

With the flock under Linda and Túlio's protection, Blu and Jewel decide to live in the Amazon with their kids, although they decide to spend their summers in Rio. Eduardo drops his anti-human stance and proudly accepts Blu into the flock, Charlie decides to stay in the Amazon, Luiz the bulldog finally arrives in the Amazon, and Nigel and Gabi are sent to Rio for study.

== Voice cast ==
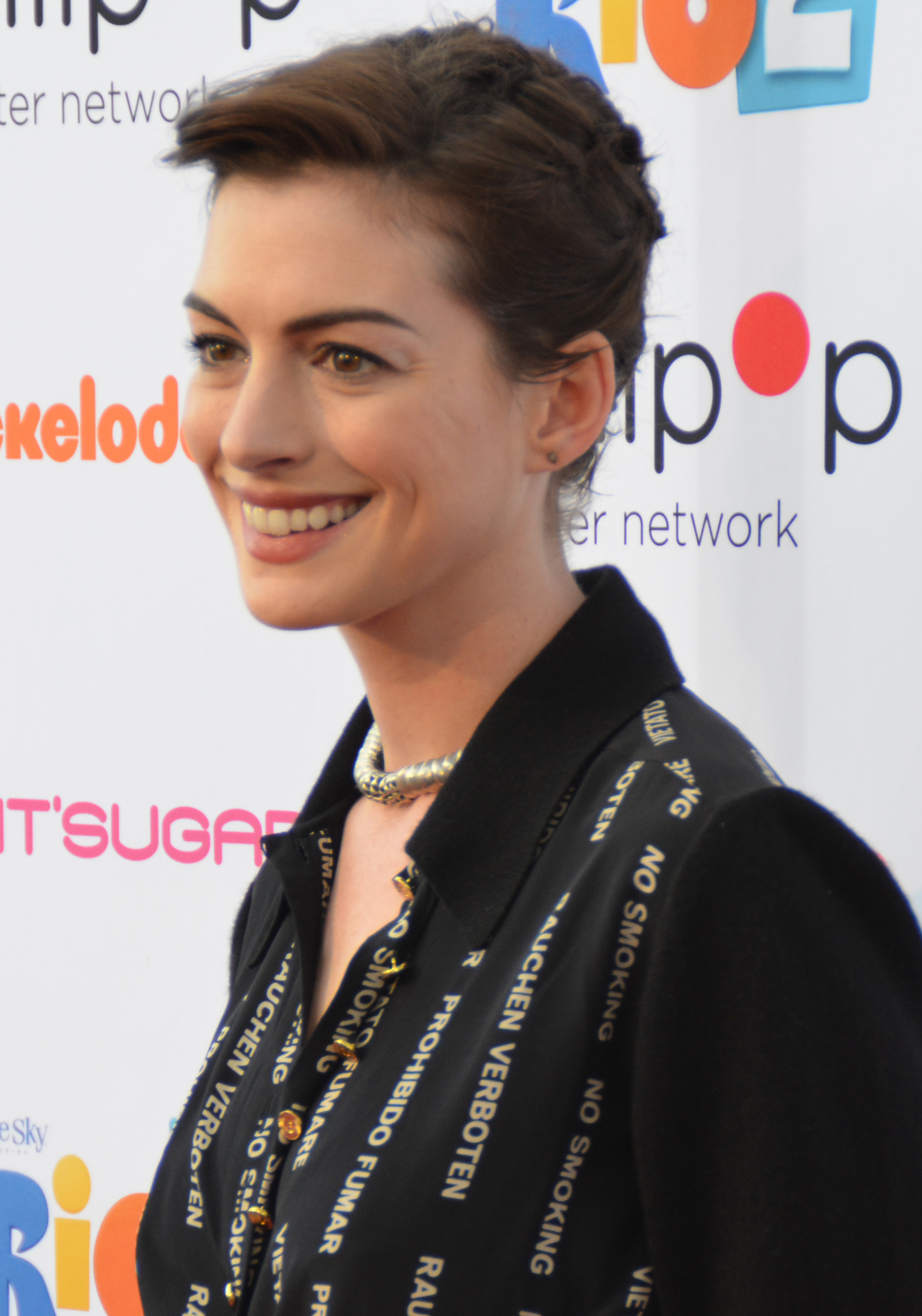
Anne Hathaway at the film's screening at Nickelodeon Studios in Burbank, California, on April 26, 2014

- Anne Hathaway as Jewel, a female Spix´s macaw from the Amazon and Blu's mate.
- Jesse Eisenberg as Blu, a male Spix's macaw who was born in Rio de Janeiro and Jewel's mate.
- Rachel Crow as Carla, Blu and Jewel's music-loving daughter and the oldest of Blu and Jewel's children.
- Amandla Stenberg as Bia, Blu and Jewel's intelligent, younger daughter, the middle child.
- Pierce Gagnon as Tiago, Blu and Jewel's youngest, mischievous, and only son.
- Andy Garcia as Eduardo, Jewel's father.
- Jemaine Clement as Nigel, an evil sulphur-crested cockatoo who seeks revenge on Blu for crippling his ability to fly.
- Kristin Chenoweth as Gabi, a poison dart frog who is Nigel's sidekick. At the end of the film, she is revealed to be a normal tree frog.
- George Lopez as Rafael: a romantic, wise and energetic toco toucan and Eva's mate who is fond of the Rio Carnival.
- Jamie Foxx as Nico, a smooth and charismatic yellow canary that wears a bottle-cap hat and a close friend to Pedro.
- will.i.am as Pedro: a rapping red-crested cardinal.
- Leslie Mann as Linda: an American woman who adopted Blu for 15 years and Tulio's wife and assistant.
- Rodrigo Santoro as Túlio, a Brazilian ornithologist and Linda's husband.
- Bruno Mars as Roberto, Jewel's suave childhood friend.
- Rita Moreno as Aunt Mimi, Eduardo's sister and Jewel's aunt.
- Tracy Morgan as Luiz, a bulldog and a chainsaw expert with a drooling condition.
- Jake T. Austin as Fernando, Linda and Tulio's adopted son.
- Miguel Ferrer as Big Boss, the hot-tempered head of the illegal logging activity. Not only was he’s the leader of the company but also has a personal Tamarin monkey.
- Janelle Monáe as Dr. Monae, a veterinarian. This was also Monae's first film role.
- Natalie Morales as a news anchor.
- Bebel Gilberto as Eva, a keel-billed toucan and Rafael's mate.
- Philip Lawrence as Felipe, the hostile leader of a scarlet macaw tribe who has a rivalry and territorial dispute with the Spix's macaws.
- Jeff Garcia as both a Spoonbill and Perl, a blue Spix's macaw auditioning for Pedro and Rafael's show. Garcia had previously voiced Tipa and the Bat in the original film. This also marks his final appearance in an animated film prior to his death in 2025.
- Sérgio Mendes as the Street Vendor. This marks his final film appearance before his death in 2024.

== Production ==
On January 25, 2012, while speaking to the Associated Press, Sérgio Mendes who co-wrote a song for the first film spoke about the sequel, saying: "I think the plan is for the movie to come three or four months before the World Cup. Fox has been talking about (it) and it looks like it's going to happen. We're going to have a meeting I think next week and Carlos is coming to town to tell us the story, and it looks like it's a go." In April 2012, Deadline Hollywood reported that Jesse Eisenberg had signed up to reprise his role as Blu, and Anne Hathaway had also signed on to reprise her role as Jewel. In October 2012, Variety stated that Carlos Saldanha had officially signed a five-year deal with distributor 20th Century Fox that allows him to helm live-action and/or animated films, with the sequel being part of that contractual agreement.

Screenwriter Don Rhymer died from complications relating to his head and neck cancer positive diagnosis on November 28, 2012, while working on the film; the film was dedicated to him. In January 2013, Rodrigo Santoro confirmed his return to voice ornithologist Tulio Monteiro, as well as hinting that the sequel's setting will involve the Amazon rainforest. 20th Century Fox and Blue Sky unveiled the first teaser trailer at the annual Las Vegas, Nevada CinemaCon on April 18, 2013. On May 14, 2013, that same trailer was released online worldwide, and attached with Epic. Entertainer Bruno Mars joined the cast as Roberto after director Carlos Saldanha caught his performance on Saturday Night Live. During production, Mars offered his own personal touches that better shaped his character's physical appearance, personality, and voice.

== Music ==
The soundtrack to Rio 2 also consisted of collaborations from Brazilian and American artists, and Brazilian musician Sérgio Mendes, would co-produce the album with the film's composer John Powell, after previously doing so for the first film's soundtrack. The soundtrack titled Rio 2 (Music from the Motion Picture) was released on March 25, 2014, by Atlantic Records. It was promoted by the samba version of the 20th Century Fox fanfare and the single "What Is Love", performed by Janelle Monáe, released as a single from the album on March 4. Powell's score was released into a separate album on April 15, 2014. The Barbatuques performed the song "Beautiful Creatures" as part of the closing ceremony of the 2016 Summer Olympics in Rio de Janeiro.

== Release ==
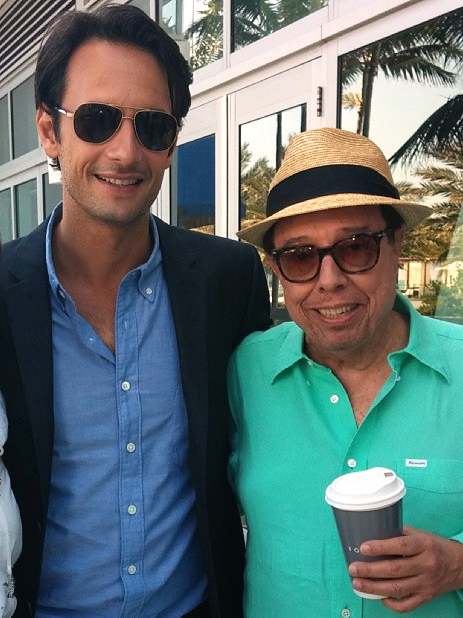
Rodrigo Santoro, who voices Tulio, and the soundtrack's producer Sérgio Mendes at the film's press event.

Rio 2 was released to international theaters on March 20, 2014. The film's premiere was held in Miami, Florida, on March 20, 2014. The film was released theatrically in the United States on April 11, 2014. The film's theatrical release was preceded by Almost Home, a short film produced by DreamWorks Animation to promote their 2015 film Home, also released by Fox.

=== Marketing ===
Under the supervision of 20th Century Fox—with director Carlos Saldanha and music composer John Powell—the film's natural hometown of Rio de Janeiro, Brazil used the film as a tie-in promotion for the 2014 New Year's Eve celebration at Copacabana Beach.

Six episodes for Angry Birds Rio — all visually tied to Rio 2 — were released between December 2013 and September 2015. The first, "Rocket Rumble", was released in December 2013, and was later followed by "High Dive" in February 2014, "Blossom River" in April 2014, "Timber Tumble" & "Hidden Harbor" in July 2014, and "Treasure Hunt" in September 2015. The main theme for these updates, that being "Angry Birds Rio 2 Theme", featured vocals by the Barbatuques, who also performed "Beautiful Creatures" in the film's soundtrack.

In April 2014, Kohl's began selling Blu, Gabi, and Luiz plush toys as a part of their Kohl's Cares merchandise program. The film also had promotional backing from Burger King, General Mills, Liberty Travel and ConAgra Foods.

=== Home media ===
On July 15, 2014, 20th Century Fox Home Entertainment released Rio 2 on Blu-ray (2D and 3D) and DVD. The Target exclusive comes with a Blu plush toy. A limited sing-along edition of the film was released on Blu-ray and DVD on November 4, 2014.

=== Streaming ===
The film was released on the Disney+ streaming service on August 4, 2023, in the United States.

== Reception ==
=== Critical response ===
On Rotten Tomatoes, the film has an approval rating of 50% based on 113 reviews and an average rating of 5.4/10. The site's critical consensus reads, "Like most sequels, Rio 2 takes its predecessor's basic template and tries to make it bigger – which means it's even busier, more colorful, and ultimately more exhausting for viewers outside the youthful target demographic." On Metacritic, the film has a score of 49 out of 100 based on 34 critics, indicating "mixed or average reviews". Audiences polled by CinemaScore gave the film an average grade of "A" on an A+ to F scale, the same grade earned by its predecessor.

Mark Adams of Screen Daily said, "As a delightfully bright and breezy bit of CGI animated entertainment Rio 2 hits the sweet spot, and will no doubt be a box office hit with its blend of good-natured jungle adventure, songs and gags. The only frustrating thing is that it feels very much like a by-the-numbers sequel, lacking the verve, ebullience and left-field humour that made 2011's Rio such a surprise hit." Justin Lowe of The Hollywood Reporter said, "This rumble in the jungle adds a colorful cast of rain-forest creatures to the franchise's infectious sense of frivolity." Justin Chang of Variety said, "Domestic and ecological dramas abound in this bright, noisy, overstuffed sequel to Fox's 2011 surprise hit." Tom Huddleston of Time Out gave the film three out of five stars, saying "There are problems here ... but the characterisation is feisty and memorable, the song-and-dance sequences intricate and colourful, and it'll charm the socks off little people." Claudia Puig of USA Today gave the film two out of four stars, saying "Rio 2 teems with colorful animated splendor and elaborate musical numbers, but its rambling, hectic, if good-hearted, story is for the birds." Richard Corliss of Time gave the film a positive review, saying "Even when it's coarse and calculating, this is an eager entertainment machine that will keep the kids satisfied. Just don't tell them that the Rio movies are musical comedies about an avian genocide."

Elizabeth Weitzman of the New York Daily News gave the film three out of five stars, saying "We're grading on a sliding scale here. But if Rio 2 is hardly Pixar quality, it's certainly better than the average animated sequel." Peter Hartlaub of the San Francisco Chronicle gave the film two out of four stars, saying "It's like the last Hobbit movie - so much time passes between side plots that you have to jog the memory when a minor character appears again. Who's that toucan again? Is he a bad guy?" Bill Goodykoontz of The Arizona Republic gave the film three out of four stars, saying "An agreeable song-and-dance movie, a laugh here, a laugh there, pleasant but overly busy, for seemingly no real reason other than to throw a few more set pieces at the wall to see what sticks." Jessica Herndon of the Associated Press gave the film three out of four stars, saying "With so much going on, it's a wonder this kids' movie is only five minutes longer than the original. But for the music and brilliantly picturesque look, it's worth the 3-D ticket." Stephanie Merry of The Washington Post gave the film two out of four stars, saying "All in all, though, the movie feels at once too busy and too derivative. That's no easy feat, but it's also one sequel-makers probably shouldn't aspire to." Bruce Demara of the Toronto Star gave the film two and a half stars out of four, saying "Those who enjoyed the adventures of Blu and Jewel and company in the first Rio are going to find the sequel an equally pleasing diversion."

Tom Russo of The Boston Globe gave the film two out of four stars, saying "The story flows, but not always freely, thanks to its manufactured feel." Jeannette Catsoulis of The New York Times gave the film a negative review, saying "The cinematic equivalent of attack by kaleidoscope, Rio 2 sucks you in and whirls you around before spitting you out, exhausted." Betsy Sharkey of the Los Angeles Times gave the film a negative review, saying "Wonderfully animated and well-voiced, Rio 2 is nevertheless too much. Too much plot, too many issues, too many characters." Bill Zwecker of the Chicago Sun-Times gave the film three out of four stars, saying "It's as good as the first one and sure to please both the kiddies and adults with its two-tiered humor." Tirdad Derakhshani of The Philadelphia Inquirer gave the film two out of four stars, saying "It'll keep the kids content for a couple of hours, though it's likely to bore the grown-ups." Liam Lacey of The Globe and Mail gave the film three out of four stars, saying "Rio 2 (like Fox's Ice Age series) relies on derivative plotting and slapstick visual gags, in contrast to Pixar's more cerebral originality. Where the film excels though, in an even more pronounced way than the first film, is in the choreographed animation for the musical numbers." Alonso Duralde of The Wrap gave the film a negative review, saying "The musical moments, on the whole, stand out as the highlights of the film; Rio 2 becomes watchable when the flat characters shut up and sing."

Rafer Guzman of Newsday gave the film one and a half stars out of four, saying "The movie has one goal: to amuse the most children with the least amount of effort." Steve Persall of the Tampa Bay Times gave the film a B+, saying "Like its peppy predecessor, Rio 2 doesn't look or sound like other animated licenses to print money. That alone is reason enough to appreciate it." Kevin McFarland of The A.V. Club gave the film a C, saying "Like the first film, Rio 2 is almost oppressively bright, bombarding the screen with flashes of saturated rainforest colors and even a bird version of soccer (timed a bit too perfectly to the 2014 World Cup in Brazil)." Mike McCahill of The Guardian gave the film two out of five stars, saying "It's hard to ascribe much art or wit to a franchise that retains the services of will.i.am as comic relief – and a thoroughly inorganic talent-show subplot feels like another attempt to groom youngsters for life in the Cowell jungle." Robbie Collin of The Daily Telegraph gave the film two out of five stars, saying "This jumbled sequel, which was also directed by Carlos Saldanha, loses most of what made the first film such an infectious entertainment." Eric Henderson of Slant Magazine gave the film one out of five stars, saying "Though there isn't a fruit-flavored hue that isn't jammed into every single corner of screen space in Rio 2, the movie has less actual nutritional value than 10 bowls of crushed Froot Loops dust. 20th Century Fox's sequel to the already dubious 2011 film would seem far too endlessly hyperventilating and self-stimulating a way to keep kids from barreling toward a spaz attack on a Saturday afternoon."

=== Box office ===
Rio 2 grossed $131.5 million in North America, and $367.2 million in other territories, for a worldwide total of $498.7 million surpassing its predecessor. In North America, the film earned $12 million on its opening day, and opened to number two in its first weekend, with $39.3 million, behind Captain America: The Winter Soldier. In its second weekend, the film dropped to number three, grossing an additional $22.2 million. In its third weekend, the film remained number three, grossing $13.9 million. In its fourth weekend, the film dropped to number five, grossing $7.7 million. Twentieth Century Fox Home Entertainment donated $100,000 to WWF to support conservation efforts in the Amazon.

=== Accolades ===
Awards
Award	Category	Recipients	Result
British Academy Children's Awards	BAFTA Kids Vote – Feature Film		Nominated
Annie Awards	Outstanding Achievement, Character Design in an Animated Feature Production	Sang Jun Lee, Jason Sadler, and José Manuel Fernández Oli	Nominated
Annie Awards	Outstanding Achievement, Storyboarding in an Animated Feature Production	John Hurst	Nominated
Annie Awards	Outstanding Achievement, Storyboarding in an Animated Feature Production	Rodrigo Perez-Castro	Nominated
Annie Awards	Outstanding Achievement, Voice Acting in an Animated Feature Production	Andy García as the voice of Eduardo	Nominated
Kids' Choice Awards	Favorite Animated Movie		Nominated
People's Choice Awards	Favorite Family Movie		Nominated
Visual Effects Society Awards	Outstanding Animation in an Animated Feature Motion Picture	Carlos Saldanha, Bruce Anderson, John C. Donkin, and Kirk Garfield	Nominated
Visual Effects Society Awards	Outstanding Animated Character in an Animated Feature Motion Picture	Gabi – Jason Sadler, Ignacio Barrios, Drew Winey, and Diana Diriwaechter	Nominated
Satellite Awards	Best Original Song	"What is Love" – Janelle Monáe	Nominated
Hollywood Film Awards	Hollywood Song Award	"What is Love" – Janelle Monáe	Won

== Future ==
=== Sequel ===
Director Carlos Saldanha had kept the possibility for Rio 3 open. In April 2014, he stated, "Of course, I have a lot of stories to tell, so we're [starting to] prepare for it". In January 2022, after the acquisition of 20th Century Fox by Disney and the closure of Blue Sky, it was announced that a new installment in the Rio franchise is officially in development, with Ray DeLaurentis writing the screenplay. In 2023, while discussing Rio 3, Saldanha stated that he was "working on a project to make it happen", confirming potential of a sequel. In November 2026, in an interview with CinePOP, Saldanha stated again of the possibility for a third Rio installment with, “It’s always a possibility, but you never know, right?”.

=== Spin-off ===
On October 25, 2019, after the acquisition of 21st Century Fox by Disney, it was reported that a spin-off that centered on Nico and Pedro is in development for Disney+.
