= Don Rhymer =

Screenwriter and film producer

- Born: February 23, 1961; Union, South Carolina, U.S.
- Died: November 28, 2012 (aged 51); Los Angeles, California, U.S.
- Occupations: screenwriter, film producer
- Years active: 1989–2012

Don Rhymer (February 23, 1961 – November 28, 2012) was an American screenwriter and film producer. He wrote movies such as Big Momma's House, The Santa Clause 2, Agent Cody Banks 2: Destination London, The Honeymooners, Deck the Halls, and Surf's Up.

== Career ==
Rhymer also enjoyed a successful TV career, and wrote and produced episodes of shows such as Coach, Evening Shade, Hearts Afire, Caroline in the City, Chicago Sons, and Fired Up.

In addition, he wrote the telefilms Banner Times, Past the Bleachers, and Under Wraps.

He co-wrote the film Rio for Blue Sky Studios and wrote the script for the sequel, released in April 2014.

== Death ==
During production of Rio in 2009, Rhymer was diagnosed with head and neck cancer, but continued to do screenwriting. He died from complications of the disease on November 28, 2012, at 51 years old. Rio 2 was dedicated to his memory.

== Filmography ==
Television

Year	Title	Writer	Producer	Notes
1989	McGee and Me!	Yes	No	1 episode
1989	Coach	Yes	No	2 episodes
1990	Bagdad Café	Yes	No	
1991-93	Evening Shade	Yes	No	8 episodes
1992	Fish Police	Yes	Co-producer	6 episodes
1993-94	Hearts Afire	Yes	Co-executive	4 episodes
1997	Chicago Sons	Yes	No	
1997	Fired Up	Yes	No	1 episode
1998	Caroline in the City	Yes	No	1 episode

TV movies

Year	Title	Writer	Producer
1993	Banner Times	Yes	No
1995	Past the Bleacher	Yes	Yes
1997	Under Wraps	Yes	Executive

Feature film writer

- Carpool (1996)
- Big Momma's House (2000)
- The Santa Clause 2 (2002)
- Agent Cody Banks 2: Destination London (2004)
- The Honeymooners (2005)
- Big Momma's House 2 (2006)
- Deck The Halls (2006)
- Surf's Up (2007)
- Big Mommas: Like Father Like Son (2011)
- Rio (2011)
- Rio 2 (2014) (Posthumous release)
- Ferdinand (2017) (Posthumous release)
