= David Mackey =

- Born: July 24, 1966 (age 59) New Westminster, British Columbia, Canada
- Height: 6 ft 3 in (191 cm)
- Weight: 205 lb (93 kg; 14 st 9 lb)
- Position: Left wing
- Shot: Left
- Played for: Chicago Blackhawks; Minnesota North Stars; St. Louis Blues
- NHL draft: 224th overall, 1984; Chicago Blackhawks
- Playing career: 1986–2000

David Mackey (born July 24, 1966) is a Canadian former professional National Hockey League player.

He played parts of six seasons for the Chicago Blackhawks, Minnesota North Stars, and St. Louis Blues. He had 8 goals, 12 assists, and 20 points in 126 games.

Mackey was born in New Westminster, British Columbia and raised in Richmond, British Columbia.

== Career statistics ==
			Regular season					Playoffs
Season	Team	League	GP	G	A	Pts	PIM	GP	G	A	Pts	PIM
1982–83	Victoria Cougars	WHL	69	16	16	32	53	12	1	1	2	4
1983–84	Victoria Cougars	WHL	69	15	15	30	97	—	—	—	—	—
1984–85	Victoria Cougars	WHL	16	5	6	11	45	6	2	1	3	13
1984–85	Portland Winterhawks	WHL	56	28	32	60	122	—	—	—	—	—
1985–86	Kamloops Blazers	WHL	9	3	4	7	13	—	—	—	—	—
1985–86	Medicine Hat Tigers	WHL	60	25	32	57	167	25	6	3	9	72
1986–87	Saginaw Generals	IHL	81	26	49	75	173	10	5	6	11	22
1987–88	Chicago Blackhawks	NHL	23	1	3	4	71	—	—	—	—	—
1987–88	Saginaw Hawks	IHL	62	29	22	51	211	10	3	7	10	44
1988–89	Chicago Blackhawks	NHL	23	1	2	3	78	—	—	—	—	—
1988–89	Saginaw Hawks	IHL	57	22	23	45	223	—	—	—	—	—
1989–90	Minnesota North Stars	NHL	16	2	0	2	28	—	—	—	—	—
1990–91	Milwaukee Admirals	IHL	82	28	30	58	226	6	7	2	9	6
1991–92	St. Louis Blues	NHL	19	1	0	1	49	1	0	0	0	0
1991–92	Peoria Rivermen	IHL	35	20	17	37	90	—	—	—	—	—
1992–93	St. Louis Blues	NHL	15	1	4	5	23	—	—	—	—	—
1992–93	Peoria Rivermen	IHL	42	24	22	46	112	4	1	0	1	22
1993–94	St. Louis Blues	NHL	30	2	3	5	56	2	0	0	0	2
1993–94	Peoria Rivermen	IHL	49	14	21	35	132	—	—	—	—	—
1994–95	Milwaukee Admirals	IHL	74	19	18	37	261	15	6	4	10	34
1995–96	Milwaukee Admirals	IHL	77	15	16	31	235	4	2	1	3	10
1996–97	Milwaukee Admirals	IHL	79	15	15	30	223	3	0	0	0	19
1997–98	Milwaukee Admirals	IHL	36	3	6	9	134	—	—	—	—	—
1997–98	Orlando Solar Bears	IHL	31	5	6	11	68	14	4	3	7	92
1998–99	Orlando Solar Bears	IHL	78	21	10	41	192	17	3	0	3	38
1999–00	Chicago Wolves	IHL	45	5	2	7	54	—	—	—	—	—
NHL totals			126	8	12	20	305	3	0	0	0	2
