= Kraken: Tentacles of the Deep =

2006 television film directed by Tibor Takács

- DVD cover
- Written by: Nicholas Garland; Sean Keller; Brian D. Young
- Directed by: Tibor Takács
- Starring: Charlie O'Connell; Victoria Pratt; Jack Scalia
- Music by: Rich Walters
- Country of origin: United States
- Original language: English

Production
- Producers: Stephen Hegyes; Kenneth M. Badish; Shawn Williamson
- Cinematography: George Campbell
- Editor: Ellen Fine
- Running time: 88 minutes
- Production companies: Nu Image Films; Brightlight Pictures
- Budget: $2,100,000 (estimated)

Original release
- Network: Sci Fi Channel
- Release: September 23, 2006

Kraken: Tentacles of the Deep, also known as Deadly Water, is a 2006 television natural horror B movie produced by Nu Image Films and Brightlight Pictures as a Sci Fi Channel original film. It premiered on the Sci Fi channel on September 23, 2006. Directed by Tibor Takács and starring Charlie O'Connell, Victoria Pratt and Jack Scalia, the film focuses on a marine biologist and a sailor who join forces to find lost Trojan treasures while battling the giant squid who killed the sailor's parents when he was a child and a treasure hunting mobster; who wants the items for himself. The film was primarily panned by critics for the special effects, far-fetched plot and scarcity of scenes involving the titular creature.

== Plot ==
As a child, Ray Reiter was the sole survivor, when a kraken had attacked his parents' boat. In the present, marine archaeologist Nicole and her assistants, Michael and Jenny are searching for a legendary opal and a Trojan death mask in the same area.

During an outing, Nicole's boat is attacked and the boat's captain is killed leaving everyone in a panic frenzy. The survivors are forced to return to shore and begin to fix their boat while searching for a new skipper. Ray, now a sea creature hobbyist pays a visit after learning about the circumstances of the previous skipper's death on the news. While Nicole is suspicious, she allows Ray to join the team in return that he fixes her boat. Nicole's competitor, Maxwell Odemus arrives to taunt Nicole and then offer to join forces with her, but she rightfully declines as he tends to steal other people's archaeological finds to sell on the black market.

Eventually, Nicole and Ray find the likely spot for the opal and return to shore to prepare themselves for the retrieval mission.

That night, Maxwell has one of his goons, Ike pay off Michael to learn where Nicole and the crew are going, then has their boat burned. Recognizing the distress and broken-dreamed Nicole, Ray buys a new boat using his life savings and the crew heads back out. Maxwell uses the co-ordinates acquired from Michael to drive out to the treasure spot and his group attack when Nicole's team arrive. Holding Michael, Jenny and Sally hostage to force Nicole, and Ray to cooperate and dive for the artifacts even though the squid is certainly waiting below, Maxwell gets Ike to shoot Michael, who dies not too long after.

Sally, Jenny and Nicole still are in a fish container that starts flooding from the kraken attacking the boat. Ray emerges from the water, and climbs onto the ship and frees Jenny, Sally, and Nicole and leave Michael's corpse. In the battle that ensues, the kraken kills Ike, Jenny, Sally, and Maxwell before being killed by Nicole and Ray. The boat sinks, while Nicole and Ray are safe, and Ray saved the mask. The opal is last seen at the bottom of the sea with infant squids and the film cuts into credits.

=== Alternate version ===
The scene of Nicole's team being attacked by Maxwell's gang and being forced to dive for the artifacts is changed to Kate being killed by the squid underwater, the other members of Maxwell's gang attacking Ray and Nicole underwater after they found the opal, and Nicole being caught by Maxwell when she surface.

- The scene of Michael being shot remains but for the reason of Nicole refusing to tell Maxwell where she kept the mask.
- The scene with Sally is slightly changed to a scene with only Sally removed.
- The scene of Nicole and Ray killing the giant squid is changed to only Ray killing the squid.

== Cast ==
- Charlie O'Connell as Ray Reiter, a sea creature hobbyist and Nicole's love interest.
- Victoria Pratt as Nicole, a marine archaeologist and Ray's love interest.
- Kristi Angus as Jenny, a member of Nicole's team and Michael's girlfriend.
- Cory Monteith as Michael, a member of Nicole's team and Jenny's boyfriend.
- Jack Scalia as Maxwell Odemus, a black market dealer and Nicole's competitor.
- Aleks Paunovic as Ike
- Nicole McKay as Kate, Maxwell's driver and henchperson.
- Michal Yannai as Sally (credited as Michal Yanai)
- Kyle Tejpar as Young Ray (credited as Kyle Morven Tejpar)
- Mike Dopud as David Reiter, Ray's father.
- Emy Aneke as Firefighter
- Elias Toufexis as Keith
- Christa Campbell as Emily Reiter, Ray's mother (uncredited)
- Alex Green as Driver Jim
- Paul Lazenby as Cam

== Production ==
The film was produced under the working title Deadly Waters. In July 2006 the Sci Fi channel held a contest in which participants submitted potential titles for the upcoming film. Kraken: Tentacles of the Deep was selected as the winning title. Rejected entries for the name included such titles as Killimari, Stop or My Squid Will Shoot, Tentacles Eight: Humans Two, The Squid Stays in the Picture, and Two Guys, A Girl, & a Giant Squid.

== Release ==
Kraken: Tentacles of the Deep premiered on the Sci Fi channel on September 23, 2006, for the channel's Saturday Night "Movie of the Week" premiere. Echo Bridge Entertainment released the film to Region 1 DVD on April 17, 2007. It was re-released on March 4, 2008, as part of a "Double Feature" set with the similarly premised film Raging Sharks. On December 15, 2008, Boulevard Entertainment released the film to Region 2 DVD in the United Kingdom under the original title Deadly Water.

== Reception ==
Reviewing the film for UGO Networks, Troy Rogers praised the film for its "straightforward and easy to follow" storyline and its special effects. Cautioning that viewers needed to approach the film with the right "outlook", he felt it a "cool mindless way to spend a Saturday night" that "offers a boatload of entertainment". When the initial premise of the movie was announced as part of the contest, Jon Condit of Dread Central found it to be the "most far-fetched premise of all time" and notes that Sci Fi later began describing it in a "more of a run-of-the-mill creature feature" way. He joked that the film's final title ended up being the same sort of title one would expect Sci Fi themselves to create, and calling it a "stinker" suggested that Sci Fi should have allowed the winner to make the film itself. He heavily criticized the producers for "[reducing] the title monster to being nothing more than a recurring plot device that isn't even the centerpiece of the film", and felt you could completely remove the squid from the film with little impact. When the squid is seen, Condit found it "boring", stating that its "attacks [were] among the least suspenseful ever seen in an animal gone amok type of flick.". DVD Talk's Scott Weinberg considered it "one of the silliest monster movies I've ever seen" and compared it to a Lifetime Television film "with a few gory bits". Calling it a "ungainly, cheap-looking, and frankly boring flick", he dismissed the unrealistic special effects, "photogenic automaton" cast, and the script as a "clumsy mish-mash of cliche, stereotype and stupidity".
