= The Final Storm (film) =

- Directed by: Uwe Boll
- Written by: Tim McGregor
- Produced by: Uwe Boll; Daniel Clarke; Shawn Williamson
- Starring: Steve Bacic; Lauren Holly; Luke Perry
- Cinematography: Mathias Neumann
- Edited by: Karen Porter
- Music by: Hal Beckett
- Production companies: Event Film; Brightlight Pictures; Boll Kino Beteiligungs GmbH & Co. KG; Flood Productions
- Distributed by: Phase 4 Films
- Release date: 13 April 2010
- Running time: 92 minutes
- Countries: Canada; Germany
- Language: English
- Budget: $5 million

The Final Storm is a 2010 apocalyptic thriller film directed by Uwe Boll and written by Canadian screenwriter Tim McGregor.

== Plot ==
Set in the rural Pacific Northwest, a mysterious character named Silas Hendershot takes refuge from a severe thunderstorm in a farm owned by Tom and Gillian Grady. He claims that he should stay and that they should watch after each other. Tom starts to dislike Silas and becomes suspicious of him and his past.

Tom travels to the town police station to look for records regarding Silas after he finds a newspaper clipping about his father and him in the attic. The whole town is deserted, with only flyers announcing a mandatory evacuation due to the storm. Tom is attacked by two deranged men after finding an article showing Silas as the actual killer of his father. Tom manages to fight the two men off and escape back to the farm.

The news article reveals that Silas' father lost the farm because he was drunk, and this enraged Silas so much that he hung him from a tree and left him there for days. When a bank foreclosure agent came by to foreclose on the house, Silas slit his throat, as well. Silas is shown to have been in prison for the last 20 years related to the two deaths. Tom, after finding his wife in the bathroom with Silas soaking in the tub, kicks him out at gunpoint and tells him never to return.

That night, however, Silas does return and starts a fire as a distraction outside, which makes Tom run out to look for Silas. Silas wraps a rope around Tom's neck and drags him up in the tree to hang, just like he did with his father. Silas then goes into the house to talk to Tom's wife and try to persuade her to become his new wife. Tom's son comes to his rescue and cuts Tom down from the tree moments before he loses consciousness. A battle then ensues between Tom and Silas. Tom burns Silas alive by pushing him into the fire Silas created as the distraction.

After the battle, Tom and his family notice that the stars in the sky start to glow and then disappear just as depicted in the Bible. Throughout the movie, Silas makes several references to the upcoming "end of the world", as well as the "rapture", as an explanation to the disappearance of the town's population and the fact that armed looters roam it. Just before the end credits role, the entire universe is shown glowing very brightly, then disappearing, signifying the world's end.

== Cast ==
- Steve Bacic as Tom Grady
- Lauren Holly as Gillian Grady
- Luke Perry as Silas Hendershot
- Cole Heppell as Graham Grady
- Blu Mankuma as Charles Booker
- Michael Eklund as Co-op Man

== Production ==
Filming began on location in Vancouver and the Sea-to-Sky Corridor, British Columbia, Canada, in late 2008, on a $5 million budget, considerably lower than most of Boll's previous films.

== Release ==
The Final Storm was released as direct-to-video production on 13 April 2010 in the United States on DVD.
