= The Long Weekend =

- Movie poster
- Directed by: Pat Holden
- Written by: Tad Safran
- Produced by: Shawn Williamson; Paul Brooks
- Starring: Chris Klein; Brendan Fehr; Chandra West
- Production company: Brightlight Pictures
- Distributed by: Lionsgate; Gold Circle Films
- Release dates: 5 August 2005 (Spain); 4 August 2006 (Canada)
- Running time: 85 minutes
- Countries: Canada; United Kingdom
- Language: English
- Budget: $1.2 million
- Box office: $3.5 million

The Long Weekend is a 2005 sex comedy film directed by Pat Holden and starring Chris Klein and Brendan Fehr alongside Chandra West. The film follows two brothers, Cooper (Klein) and Ed Waxman (Fehr), who participate in a weekend of debauchery.

== Plot ==
Cooper is an actor who sees life as one big party, while Ed is in advertising and takes life too seriously. When Ed gets stressed over a deadline he has to meet, Cooper works to get his brother hooked up with a girl, thus a long weekend of stress and beautiful women, culminating in Ed's meeting, and having sex with, the woman of his dreams - and all without his brother's meddling.

== Cast ==
- Chris Klein as Cooper Waxman
- Brendan Fehr as Ed Waxman
- Chandra West as Kim
- Craig Fairbrass as Frank
- Paul Campbell as Roger
- Cobie Smulders as Ellen
- Chelan Simmons as Susie
- Andy Thompson as Officer Garcia
- Evangeline Lilly as Simone

== Release ==
Senator International handled international sales of The Long Weekend, which resulted in Universal Pictures acquiring the German theatrical rights to the film.

== Reception ==
=== Box office ===
In the United States, The Long Weekend had a limited release, opening in three theaters. It grossed $1,286 during the June 9–11 weekend.

The Long Weekend had its most successful run in Spain, where it grossed $399,620 in its opening weekend, ranking seventh at the box office during the August 5–7 weekend.

=== Critical response ===
Jim Kaz of IGN gave the film a negative review, criticizing the film's humor by stating that it "runs through the gamut of cheap tricks and corny slapstick bits." However, he praised Klein's lead performance. Peter Debruge of Variety gave a similar review, calling the film "off-color" and criticizing Fehr's performance as "mopey."
