= Pink Ludoos =

- Directed by: Gaurav Seth
- Starring: Jazz Mann; Jay Kazim; Agam Darshi
- Release date: 11 March 2004
- Country: Canada
- Budget: English

Pink Ludoos (English: Pink Laddu) is a 2004 film directed by Gaurav Seth, about a Sikh family in Canada, dealing with gender and caste issues. It stars Jay Kazim as Gugan, a rebellious daughter resisting an arranged marriage, and Shaheen Khan as her mother.

== Reception ==
In a Variety review Dennis Harvey said "If imitation is flattery, the most fawning movie in recent memory must be “Pink Ludoos,” a feel-good Canadian pic that pilfers shamelessly from so many sources (especially recent Indo-Anglo comedies like “Monsoon Wedding”) that there isn't an authentic moment in sight."

== Cast ==
- Jay Kazim as Gugan
- Shaheen Khan as Mrs Dhaliwal
- Balinder Johal
- Jazz Mann as Arjan
