= Alex Zamm =

American film director

- Born: Alexander Zamm; Woodstock, New York, U.S.
- Occupations: Film director, screenwriter
- Years active: 1990–present

Alexander Zamm (born in Woodstock, New York) is an American film director and screenwriter. Zamm has directed such films as My Date with the President's Daughter, Tooth Fairy 2, The Pooch and the Pauper, Dr. Dolittle: Million Dollar Mutts, R.L. Stine's The Haunting Hour, Snow, and Woody Woodpecker. Most of his work has been released through television, direct-to-video, or streaming.

== Early life ==
Zamm grew up in Woodstock, New York.

== Filmography ==
=== Film ===
Year	Film	Notes
1998	Chairman of the Board	Also writer
1998	My Date with the President's Daughter	Also writer Television film
1998	The Pooch and the Pauper	Television film
2000	The Bogus Witch Project	Producer only
2003	Inspector Gadget 2	Also writer Direct-to-DVD
2004	Snow	Television film
2007	The Haunting Hour: Don't Think About It	Direct-to-DVD
2009	Dr. Dolittle: Million Dollar Mutts	Direct-to-DVD
2010	Marvin the Martian	3D Test Short
2011	Beverly Hills Chihuahua 2	Direct-to-DVD
2012	Tooth Fairy 2	Direct-to-DVD
2014	The Little Rascals Save the Day	Also writer Direct-to-DVD
2014	A Royal Christmas	Television film
2014	Jingle All the Way 2	Direct-to-DVD
2015	Crown for Christmas	Television film
2017	A Christmas Prince	Streaming film
2017	Christmas in Evergreen	Television film
2017	Woody Woodpecker	Also writer and co-producer
2019	Paris, Wine, & Romance	Television film
2021	Under Wraps	Also writer Television film
2022	Under Wraps 2	Television film
TBA	Hong Kong Phooey	Also writer and co-producer

=== Television ===
Year	Film	Notes
1990	Monsters	TV
1992	Great Scott!	TV
1995	Inconvenience	Pilot (MTV)
1995	Life with Louie	Writer; Television series
1996	Bone Chillers	Writer (2 episodes); Television series
2000	Upright Citizens Brigade	Television series
2010	Woodie's Kitchen	Pilot
2014	Dog with a Blog	3 episodes Television series
2014	The Thundermans	1 episode Television series
2018-2022	Woody Woodpecker	Web series Developer; Director (season 1)
2024	The Baxters	12 episodes Streaming series

== Accolades ==
Name of the award ceremony, year presented, work(s) nominated, category, and the result of the nomination
Award ceremony	Year	Work(s)	Category	Result	Ref.
Cannes Film Festival	1987	Maestro	Palme d'Or (Award for Best Short Film)	Nominated	
