= American Indian Film Festival =

Native American/First Nations films

- Location: San Francisco, California, U.S.
- Founded: 1975
- Festival date: November
- Website: http://www.aifisf.com/

The American Indian Film Festival is an annual non-profit film festival in San Francisco, California, United States. It is the world's oldest venue dedicated solely to Native American/First Nations films and prepared the way for the 1979 formation of the American Indian Film Institute.

According to the institute, the Festival was first presented in Seattle, Washington in 1975 and moved in 1977 to San Francisco, where it remains today. In 1979, the Festival was incorporated.

Over 3,100 films have been screened from Native American/First Nations communities in the U.S. and Canada, and the festival includes events such as film screenings, panel discussions, an awards ceremony and networking events.

This festival is not to be confused by the Native American Film and Video Festival, which was founded in 1979.

== Winners ==
=== Best Film ===
Year	Film	Producers	Ref
1987	Loyalties	William Johnston and Ronald Lillie	
1988	Journey to Spirit Island	Bruce D. Clark and Rodger Spero	
1989	Powwow Highway	Jan Weiringa	
1990	Dances With Wolves	Jim Wilson and Kevin Costner	
1992	Incident at Oglala	Arthur Chobanian	
1993	Medicine River	Barbara Allinson, John Danylkiw and Arvi Liimatainen	
1994	Lakota Woman: Siege at Wounded Knee	Fred Berner	
1995	Dance Me Outside	Brian Dennis	
1996	Grand Avenue	Tony To	
1998	Smoke Signals	Larry Estes	
1999	Unbowed	Lisa Karadjian and Nanci Rossov	
2000	Backroads	Shirley Cheechoo, Phyllis Ellis and Christine K. Walker	
2001	The Doe Boy	Chris Eyre and Anthony Vozza	
2002	Atanarjuat: The Fast Runner	Paul Apak Angilirq, Norman Cohn, Zacharias Kunuk and Germaine Wong	
2003	Dreamkeeper	Ron McLeod and Matthew O'Connor	
2004	Edge of America	Chris Eyre and Willy Holtzman	
2005	Johnny Tootall	Cynthia Chapman and Danielle Prohom Olson	
2006	Expiration Date	John Forsen and Rick Stevenson	
2007	Imprint	Chris Eyre and Michael Linn	
2008	Before Tomorrow	Stéphane Rituit	
2009	Barking Water	Chad Burris	
2010	A Windigo Tale	Armand Garnet Ruffo	
2011	Shouting Secrets	Josef Ueli Bollag and Korinna Sehringer	
2012	Mesnak	Reginald Vollant	
2013	Maïna	Yves Fortin and Karine Martin	
2014	Drunktown's Finest	Chad Burris and Mateo Frazier	
2015	Mekko	Chad Burris and Jasper Zweibel	
2016	Before the Streets	Chloé Leriche	
2017	Wind River	Elizabeth A. Bell, Peter Berg, Matthew George, Basil Iwanyk and Wayne L. Rogers	
2018	Angelique's Isle	Amos Adetuyi, Dave Clement, Michelle Derosier and Floyd Kane	
2019	Edge of the Knife	Jonathan Frantz	
2020	Monkey Beach	Loretta Todd, Patti Poskitt, Carla Robinson, Fred Fuchs, Matthew O'Connor, Lisa Richardson	
2021	Run Woman Run	Paula Devonshire, Laura Milliken, PJ Thornton	
2022	Broken Angel	Patti Poskitt, Jules Arita Koostachin, Anne Wheeler	

=== Best Director ===
Year	Director	Film	Ref
2001	Randy Redroad	The Doe Boy	
2002	Zacharias Kunuk	Atanarjuat: The Fast Runner	
2003	Norma Bailey	Cowboys and Indians: The J.J. Harper Story	
2004	Chris Eyre	Edge of America	
2005	Aaron James Sorensen	Hank Williams First Nation	
2006	Zacharias Kunuk, Norman Cohn	The Journals of Knud Rasmussen	
2007	Sterlin Harjo	Four Sheets to the Wind	
2008	Georgina Lightning	Older Than America	
2009	Kevin Wilmott	The Only Good Indian	
2010	Jeremy Torrie	A Flesh Offering	
2011	Andrew Okpeaha MacLean	On the Ice	
2012	Jeremy Torrie	Path of Souls	
2013	Alex Smith, Andrew J. Smith	Winter in the Blood	
2014	Jeff Barnaby	Rhymes for Young Ghouls	
2015	Chloé Zhao	Songs My Brothers Taught Me	
2016	Nathan Frankowski	Te Ata	
2017	Marie Clements	The Road Forward	
2018	Zoe Leigh Hopkins	Kayak to Klemtu	
2019	Marie Clements	Red Snow	
2020	Loretta Todd	Monkey Beach	
2021	Trevor Mack	Portraits from a Fire	
2022	Jason Brennan	The Inhuman	

=== Best Actor ===
Year	Actor	Film	Ref
2001	James Duval	The Doe Boy	
2002	Natar Ungalaaq	Atanarjuat: The Fast Runner	
2003	August Schellenberg'	Dreamkeeper	
2004	George Leach	Distant Drumming	
2005	Adam Beach	Johnny Tootall	
2006	Robert A. Guthrie	Expiration Date	
2007	Cody Lightning	Four Sheets to the Wind	
2008	Trevor Duplessis	In a World Created by a Drunken God	
2009	Wes Studi	The Only Good Indian	
2010	John Cook	Of Mice and Men	
2011	Chaske Spencer	Shouting Secrets	
2012	Victor Andrés Trelles Turgeon	Mesnak	
2013	Chaske Spencer	Winter in the Blood	
2014	Glen Gould	Rhymes for Young Ghouls	
2015	Rod Rondeaux	Mekko	
2016	Gil Birmingham	Te Ata	
2017	Graham Greene	Wind River	
2018	Lorne Cardinal	Kayak to Klemtu	
2019	Tyler York	Edge of the Knife	
2020	Adam Beach	Monkey Beach	
2021	Stormee Kipp	Sooyii	
2022	Samian	The Inhuman	

=== Best Actress ===
Year	Actress	Film	Ref
2001	Jeri Arredondo	The Doe Boy	
2002	Lucy Tulugarjuk	Atanarjuat: The Fast Runner	
2003	Alex Rice	Coyote Waits	
2004	Tina Keeper	Distant Drumming	
2005	Stacy Da Silva	Hank Williams First Nation	
2006	Andrea Menard	The Velvet Devil	
2007	Tonantzin Carmelo	Imprint	
2008	Candy Fox	Moccasin Flats: Redemption	
2009	Casey Camp-Horinek	Barking Water	
2010	Andrea Menard	A Windigo Tale	
2011	Michelle St. John	Every Emotion Costs	
2012	Ève Ringuette	Mesnak	
2013	Roseanne Supernault	Maïna	
2014	Cara Gee	Empire of Dirt	
2015	Ève Ringuette	Le Dep	
2016	Imajyn Cardinal	The Saver	
2017	Devery Jacobs	The Sun at Midnight	
2018	Julia Jones	Angelique's Isle	
2019	Lake Delisle	Rustic Oracle	
2020	Grace Dove	Monkey Beach	
2021	Dakota Ray Hebert	Run Woman Run	
2022	Sera-Lys McArthur	Broken Angel	
