= Carmen Moore (American actress) =

American actress (1986–2018)

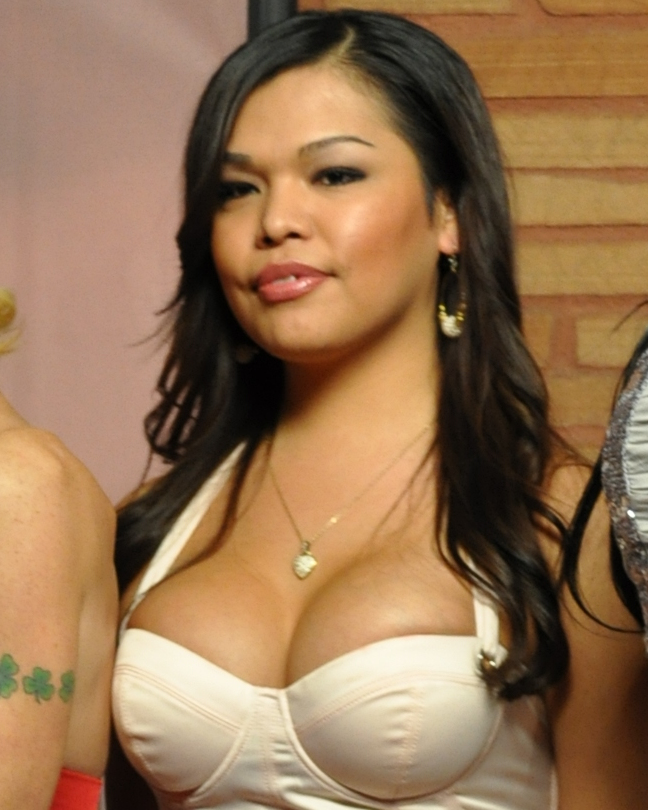
- Moore at the 28th AVN Awards
- Born: Carmen Kym Moore; February 21, 1986; Navajo Nation, Arizona, U.S.
- Died: August 31, 2018 (aged 32); Las Vegas, Nevada, U.S.
- Other name: Kymberly Yazzie
- Occupation: Pornographic film actress
- Years active: 2008–2018
- Notable work: Drunktown's Finest

Carmen Kym Moore (February 21, 1986 – August 31, 2018), also known as Kymberly Yazzie, was a Native American actress. She began her acting career in the pornographic film industry, starring in 34 original features after her debut in 2008.

Moore made her feature film debut playing Felixcia in Sydney Freeland's 2014 film Drunktown's Finest. She was nominated for Best Actress at the 2014 American Indian Film Festival for her performance.

== Biography ==
Carmen Kym Moore was born on February 21, 1986 in a part of the Navajo Nation in northwestern Arizona. As an adult she moved to Las Vegas, Nevada. She was a transgender woman who also identified as nádleehi and two-spirit. Moore died on August 31, 2018.

== Filmography ==
=== Films ===
Year	Tile	Role
2018	Transfinite	Shayla
2014	Drunktown's Finest	Felixia

=== Web Series ===
Year	Title	Role	Notes
2014	How We Make Movies	Herself	"Sundance #10 - Drunktown's Finest"

== Recognition ==
Year	Award	Result	Category
2011	Transgender Erotica Awards	Nominee	Best Solo Website
2014	American Indian Film Festival	Nominee	Best Actress
2014	AVN Awards	Nominee	Transsexual Actress of the Year
2014	NightMoves Awards	Nominee	Best Transexual Performer
2014	NightMoves Awards	Nominee	Best Transexual Performer for Fans
