= The Boxcar Children =

Children's book series

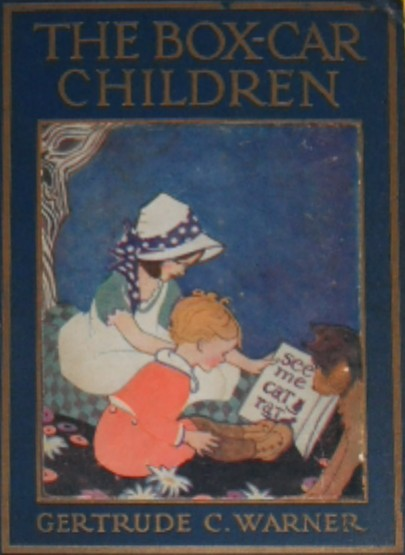
- 1924 first edition of the first book
- Author: Gertrude Chandler Warner, et al.
- Country: United States
- Genre: Children's
- Publisher: Albert, Whitman and Company (1942-2023); Penguin Random House (2023-present)
- Published: 1924 – present
- No. of books: 162 (not including specials, spin-offs, and miniseries); 204 (including specials, spin-offs, and miniseries)
- Website: https://www.boxcarchildren.com

The Boxcar Children is a children's book series originally created and written by American first-grade school teacher Gertrude Chandler Warner and currently published by Random House Children's Books. It was previously published through Albert, Whitman and Company until 2023. Today, the series includes over 160 titles, with more being released every year. The series is aimed at readers in grades 2–6.

Originally published in 1924 by Rand McNally (as The Box-Car Children) and reissued in a shorter revised form in 1942 by Albert Whitman & Company, The Boxcar Children tells the story of four orphaned siblings: Henry, Jessie, Violet, and Benny Alden. They create a home for themselves in an abandoned boxcar in the forest. Eventually, the Aldens meet their paternal grandfather, who is a wealthy and kind man (although the children had believed him to be cruel since he did not like their mother). The children decide to live with him, who moves the beloved boxcar to his backyard so they can use it as a playhouse. The book was adapted as a film of the same name in 2014 and the sequel novel Surprise Island was released as a film four years later. Based on a 2007 online poll, the National Education Association listed the original book as one of its "Teachers' Top 100 Books for Children". In 2012, the original novel was ranked among the all-time "Top 100 Chapter Books", or children's novels, in a survey published by School Library Journal.

In the subsequent books, the children encounter many adventures and mysteries in their neighborhood or at the locations they visit with their grandfather. The majority of the books are set in locations the children are visiting over school holidays such as summer vacation or Christmas break. Only the first 19 stories were written by creator Warner. Other books in the series have been written by other writers, but always feature the byline "Created by Gertrude Chandler Warner". While the Alden children age in Warner's books, they remain younger in the ones published after her death, with each book set around its publication date.

== Plot summary of the original novel ==
The original Boxcar Children novel tells a story of four orphaned siblings: Henry, Jessie, Violet, and Benny Alden. Not wishing to live with their hard-hearted paternal grandfather, whom they have never met because of his dislike for their mother, the children strike out on their own following their parents' death. On a warm night, the children stop at a bakery to ask for food, where they are invited to stay for the night. However, when they overhear the baker and his wife are planning to keep the three older children as laborers and send Benny to an orphanage, the children decide to escape and flee to the woods instead.

There, they sleep on some pine needles. Jessie then sees it is about to rain, and frantically searches for some shelter. At that point, she finds an abandoned boxcar and takes her siblings to it. They all renovate it into their new home and find useful items such as kitchenware at the junkyard, use a stream for water, and collect blueberries for their meals. They also adopt a stray dog that they name Watch. Realizing that they cannot live on water and blueberries, Henry walks to a nearby town called Silver City for work. He meets a young doctor, Dr. Moore, who hires Henry for odd jobs, often paying him in spare food and clothing as well as money. Suspecting that Henry is not telling the full truth about himself, Dr. Moore follows Henry home in secret and sees the children's living conditions. He decides that they are safe for now and that he should allow Henry to tell the truth when he feels comfortable. Dr. Moore gifts Henry a hammer and Henry also takes a few nails from the doctor. With the tools, Henry and his siblings create a swimming pool and a dam in the stream. Henry also makes a cart for Benny.

While Henry is working at Dr. Moore's house, Dr. Moore invites Henry to see the Field Day competition. He does not tell Henry that it is conducted by James Henry Alden, the grandfather of the boxcar children. There, Henry hears about a free-for-all race and takes part. Running at his fastest pace, Henry wins the race. He is awarded a silver cup and $25 by James Henry Alden, his grandfather, neither of them recognizing that they are family. Once Henry returns to the boxcar, his siblings are very glad for him.

At some point, Benny's hair begins to grow, so Jessie cuts it with Violet's scissors. Benny in turn cuts Watch's hair and tries to make a 'J' symbol (he is learning to read, and thinks of Watch as Jessie's dog). This makes Jessie and Violet laugh very hard, but Violet falls seriously ill. The siblings do not want to go to the hospital because they do not want to reveal their identity while also not having enough money to pay at the hospital. Henry runs to Dr. Moore, who takes Violet to his own house instead of the hospital. He and Mrs. Moore invite Henry, Jessie, and Benny, along with Watch, to stay there as guests.

Meanwhile, the children's grandfather, James Henry Alden, has been offering a reward for news of his four missing grandchildren. The doctor connects the missing grandchildren with the ones in his care and goes to speak to Alden, warning him that his grandchildren are afraid of him and encouraging him to befriend the children before revealing who he is. Alden is introduced to the children as a friend of the doctor's. The children find him warm and friendly; by the time they learn the truth, the children are surprised to learn that Alden is really their "cruel" grandfather and are more than willing to live with him.

The children are happy and need for nothing at their grandfathers house, but they still fondly remember the days they spent living in the boxcar. Benny misses it the most and reminisces about his cracked pink teacup. As a surprise to cheer up the children, Mr. Alden has the boxcar fully restored, repainted, and moved into his backyard, including the surroundings such as the old dead stump they used to climb inside. The children are thrilled to have the boxcar back to use as their new clubhouse, their lives are now whole.

== Characters ==
=== Main characters ===
The characters are named here as they are in the revised edition of the original book, and its sequels. The family name in the 1924 original edition is Cordyce rather than Alden.

Henry James Alden is the eldest of the Alden children; in most books of the series, Henry is 14 years old (13 in the 1924 edition). He is shown to be calm, hardworking, rational, humble, and very protective of his younger siblings. Henry also shows a knack for repairing things and is a natural athlete. In Warner's original books, Henry ages and eventually goes off to college in The Lighthouse Mystery.

Jessica "Jessie" Alden (Jess in the 1924 original edition) is usually 12 years old and is the older sister. She often acts motherly towards Benny and Violet and even Henry. Jessie is often responsible for cooking and is described as being very tidy and organized. Jessie is sometimes called Jess, but is mostly referred to as Jessie. She is not afraid of anything, adores the color blue, and is very strong.

Violet Alden is 10 years old in most of the books. She is the most sensitive of the children and is skillful at painting and sewing. Violet can frequently win over grouchy characters and is good with animals. She is often shy and loves playing the violin. Violet's favorite color is violet or purple and she often wears one of those colors. Violet is the shyest of all the children, and sometimes helps Jessie take care of Benny.

Benjamin "Benny" Alden is the youngest child at six years old (5 in the original 1924 edition). He celebrates his seventh birthday in Surprise Island and continues to age throughout the original series, until he is old enough for a department store job in the last original book, Benny Uncovers a Mystery. Benny is known for his love of all food and the cracked pink cup he found in the dump. Benny's endearingly childish qualities and comments, along with his enthusiasm, make him a favorite among young readers. Benny loves Watch dearly and was also the one who named Watch.

Watch is the dog of the Boxcar children. He acted as a "watchdog" when they lived in the boxcar and protected them. Watch was originally owned by a wealthy lady, but ran away and was adopted by the Alden children. The lady was so charmed by the children that she let them keep him. Watch is a Wire Fox Terrier (an Airedale in the 1924 edition), and the children found him while Henry was away at work. Watch had a thorn in his paw, and Jessie removed it. Because of this, Watch became known as her dog. In subsequent books, his bed is in Jessie's bedroom.

James Henry Alden is the wealthy and kind paternal grandfather of the Alden children, allowing them a lot of freedom and always offering them advice. He takes care of the kids after the death of their parents. At first, the kids thought their grandfather was mean because he did not like their mother, so they ran away from him. However, they later realized his goodness and came to live with him. James Henry Alden also organizes the Field Day competitions.

Dr. Moore (Dr. McAllister in the original 1924 edition) is the man who originally gave Henry a job and helped Violet when she was ill. He is the same person who connected Henry, Jessie, Violet, Benny, and Watch with their grandfather.

=== Secondary characters ===
Mrs. McGregor: The Aldens' housekeeper, her husband was first seen in the third book of the series.

Mr. McGregor mows the lawn and he is Mr. Alden's conductor. He is also married to Mrs. McGregor.

Mike is Benny's best friend and appeared in Surprise Island.

John Joseph "Joe" Alden and Alice: The children's cousins/aunt and uncle, Joe was first seen in the second book of the series, Surprise Island. Alice was first introduced in The Yellow House Mystery; she also married Joe in the same book. They moved to a new house in The Mystery of the Singing Ghost. They adopted Soo Lee from Korea.

Aunt Jane and Uncle Andy: The children's great aunt (Grandfather Alden's sister) and her husband, Aunt Jane was once unkind, but was changed in Mystery Ranch, the fourth book of the series.

John Carter: An employee of the children's grandfather, he does investigation and carries out the children's grandfather's wishes "off camera". He has a secret soft-spot for Jessie.

Lars Larson: A fun middle-aged man and a friend of Grandfather's, Lars was first seen in Blue Bay Mystery.

== Animated film ==
An animated film The Boxcar Children was released in 2014. The voice of Grandfather Alden is played by Martin Sheen, and Dr. Moore is voiced by J. K. Simmons. Zachary Gordon, Joey King, Mackenzie Foy, and Jadon Sand voiced Henry, Jessie, Violet, and Benny respectively. The film is also available on DVD.

The film debuted at the Toronto International Film Festival / Kids (TiFF/Kids) in April 2014 and went on to play at 15 more festivals including Woods Hole International Film Festival, St. Louis International Film Festival and the Gijón International Film Festival in Spain. The film won Best Animated Feature Film at the 2015 St. Tropez International Film Festival.

The film was released by Entertainment One. It had a limited theatrical run in North America, and was released on DVD and VOD on August 19, 2014. Streaming and TV rights were sold exclusively to Netflix on October 4 of the same year. The film was directed and produced by Daniel Chuba and Mark A.Z. Dippe. The executive producer was Maureen Sargent Gorman.

The sequel film, The Boxcar Children: Surprise Island, was originally planned to be released in the fall 2017, but Fathom Events released the film in select theaters on May 8, 2018, followed by a DVD release on August 14 the same year.

== Series ==
After the first novel, the children become amateur sleuths, and the subsequent series involves the children solving various mysteries and occasionally traveling to other locations as they do so. They stumble across a mystery no matter where they are, whether on vacation or in their own backyard. They usually solve the mystery with very little adult intervention, although adults are present in the novel (the author said she wrote about mostly unsupervised children because that would appeal to children). Some of the mysteries border on the supernatural, although the practical Henry and Jessie always find the sensible reason for anything that appears other-worldly. Most of the mysteries involve thefts and usually involve the Alden children helping someone they know.

The series are divided into mysteries and specials; all of the specials were written after Warner's death. As of 2021, there were 159 mysteries and 21 specials in the series. In 2017, the first Boxcar Children miniseries was published (Great Adventure), and since 2021 three more have been written (Creatures of Legend, Endangered Animals, and Summer of Adventure). In addition, two spin-off series have been released. The first, The Adventures of Benny and Watch was published from 1998–2004, and the second, The Jessie Files, began in 2022.

In May 2023, original publisher Albert, Whitman and Company sold the rights to the Boxcar Children series to Random House Children's Books.

== About the author ==
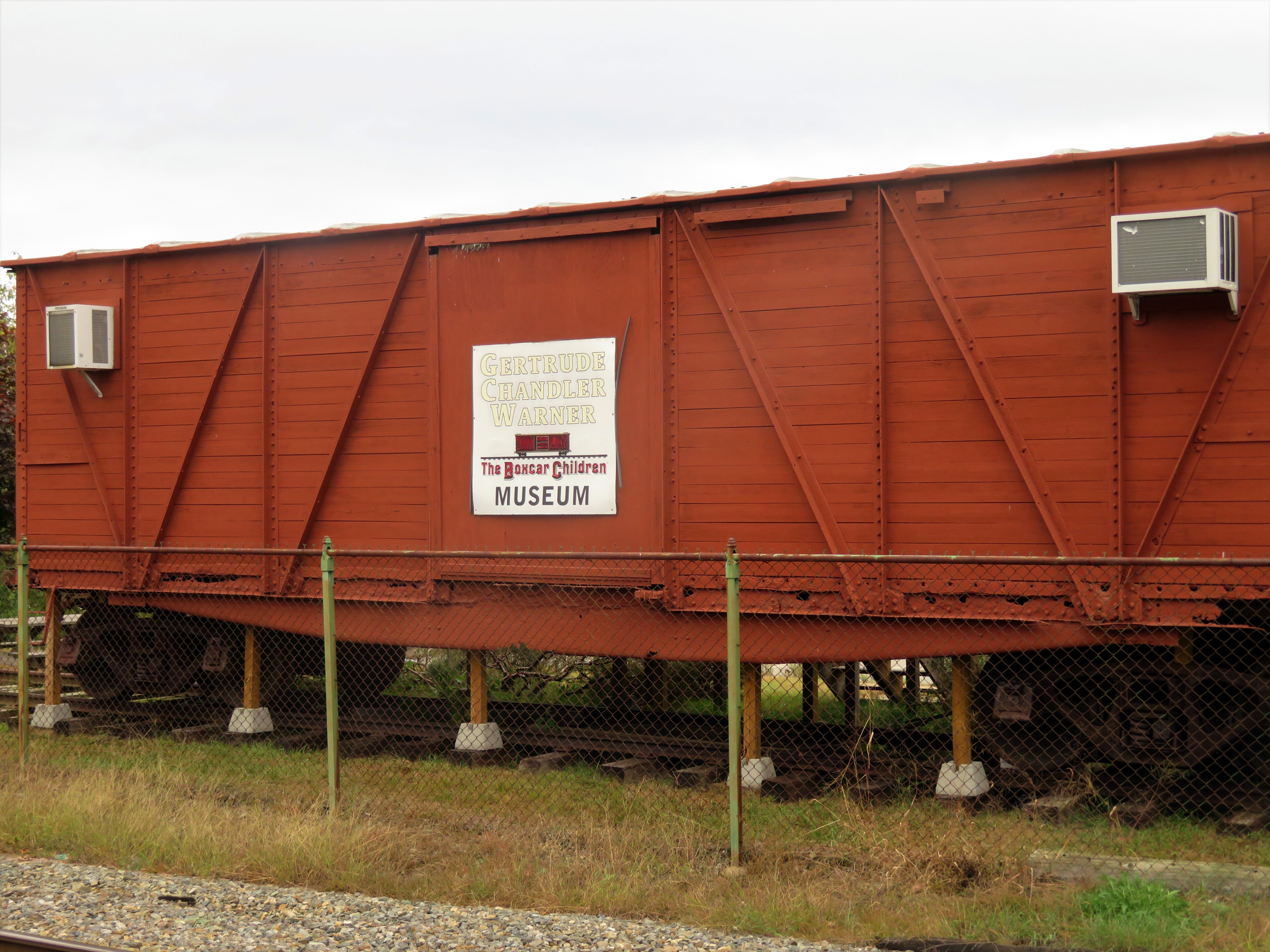
Boxcar at the museum in 2018

Warner's life was chronicled in the biography Gertrude Chandler Warner and the Boxcar Children by Mary Ellen Ellsworth, illustrated by Marie DeJohn, which tells the story of Warner's childhood living across the street from the railroad tracks, her bouts with poor health, her teaching career, her earliest attempts at writing, and her inspiration for The Boxcar Children.

In July 2004, a museum in Putnam, Connecticut, was opened in a red boxcar to honor Gertrude Warner and the Boxcar Children series.

As she wrote the story, Warner read it to her classes and rewrote it many times so the words were easy to understand. Some of her pupils spoke other languages at home and were just learning English, so The Boxcar Children gave them a fun story that was easy to read. Warner once wrote that the original book "raised a storm of protest from librarians who thought the children were having too good a time without any parental control! That is exactly why children like it!"

== See also ==
- List of Boxcar Children novels
