= Travis Gutiérrez Senger =

American director, writer and producer

- Education: University of Washington
- Occupations: Director, Screenwriter, Film Producer

Travis Gutiérrez Senger is a Mexican-American director, writer and producer.

His second feature film, ASCO: Without Permission, premiered at SXSW in March of 2025. The film, which features a mix of archival footage, present day interviews, and fictional sequences, is executive produced by Gael Garcia Bernal and Diego Luna.

His debut feature, Desert Cathedral, starring Lee Tergesen and Chaske Spencer was released by Random Media and The Orchard on September 27, 2016.

Senger's documentary short, White Lines and the Fever: The Death of DJ Junebug, won awards at Tribeca and SXSW in 2010.
