= Sheila Tousey =

American actress (born 1959)

- Born: Sheila May Tousey; June 4, 1959 (age 67); Keshena, Wisconsin, U.S.
- Education: University of New Mexico, Albuquerque (BA); New York University (MFA)
- Occupation: Actress
- Years active: 1992–present

Sheila May Tousey (born June 4, 1959) is a Native American actress.

== Biography ==
Born in Keshena, Wisconsin in 1959, Tousey is a stage and film actress of Menominee and Stockbridge-Munsee descent. She was raised on both Menominee and Stockbridge-Munsee reservations. Tousey began dancing as a small child.

She did not perform on stage until she attended Albuquerque's University of New Mexico. She initially entered the university's law program, planning to specialize in federal contracts and Native American law, but later changed her major to English. At the time, she started taking theater arts courses. After graduating, Tousey enrolled in the graduate acting program at New York University's Tisch School of the Arts. She directed her first play, An Evening at the Warbonnet, at the University of New Mexico in 1994.

Tousey has become a professional dancer and actress. Her first movie role was in Thunderheart (1992), and she appeared in Medicine River that same year. Her succeeding roles have been in a variety of characters, including appearances on Law & Order. Beginning in 2002, she has appeared in four movies adapted from Tony Hillerman mystery novels, which feature Native Americans of the Southwest.

== Filmography ==
Film
Year	Title	Role	Notes
1992	Thunderheart	Maggie Eagle Bear	Last surviving cast
1993	Medicine River	Louise Heavyman	
1993	Slaughter of the Innocents	Agent Lemar	
1994	Silent Tongue	Awbonnie/Ghost	
1995	Lord of Illusions	Jennifer Desiderio	
1996	Grand Avenue	Mollie	
1997	Song of Hiawatha	Nokomis	
1997	Sparkler	Hurricane	
1999	Ravenous	Martha	
1999	Wildflowers	Martha	
2000	Backroads	Grace Nelson	
2000	The Other Side	Edna	
2001	Two Grey Hills	Nellie Begay	
2002	Skinwalkers	Emma Leaphorn	
2003	Dreamkeeper	Janine	
2003	Coyote Waits	Emma Leaphorn	
2004	A Thief of Time	Emma Leaphorn	
2005	Johnny Tootall	Agnes	
2005	Into the West	Older Thunder Heart Woman	
2005	Christmas in the Clouds	Mary	

== Awards and nominations ==
Year	Award	Category	Work	Result	Ref.
2000	First Americans in the Arts Award	Outstanding Performance by an Actress in a Supporting Role (Film)	Ravenous	Nominated	
2002	American Indian Film Festival	Best Supporting Actress	Skinwalkers	Won	
2003	First Americans in the Arts Award	Outstanding Performance by an Actress in a Supporting Role in a TV Movie/Special	Skinwalkers	Won	
2003	American Indian Film Festival	Best Actress	DreamKeeper	Nominated	
2005	American Indian Film Festival	Best Actress	Johnny Tootall	Nominated	
2024	Drama Desk Award	Outstanding Featured Performance in a Play	Manahatta	Nominated	
2025	Obie Award	Special Citation	The 1491s	Won	
