= The Boxcar Children: Surprise Island =

2018 American animated film

- Film poster
- Directed by: Anna Chi; Mark A.Z. Dippé; Wonjae Lee
- Written by: Daniel Chuba
- Based on: The Boxcar Children: Surprise Island by Gertrude Chandler Warner
- Produced by: Daniel Chuba
- Starring: Joey King; Talitha Bateman; Griffin Gluck; Carter Sand; Gil Birmingham; Stephen Stanton; Dane DeHaan; J. K. Simmons; Martin Sheen
- Edited by: Michael Rafferty
- Music by: Kenneth Burgomaster
- Production company: Legacy Classics Family Entertainment
- Distributed by: Blueberry Pictures
- Release date: May 8, 2018
- Running time: 81 minutes
- Country: United States
- Language: English
- Box office: $78,676

The Boxcar Children: Surprise Island is a 2018 American independent animated adventure film featuring the voices of Joey King, Talitha Bateman, Griffin Gluck, Carter Sand, Gil Birmingham, Stephen Stanton, Dane DeHaan, J. K. Simmons and Martin Sheen. It is the sequel of the 2014 film The Boxcar Children. The film premiered on May 8, 2018, in theatres.

== Plot ==
The continuing adventures of Henry, Jessie, Violet, and Benny as they spend the summer on their grandfather's private island.

== Voice cast ==
- Joey King as Jessie Alden: Jessie is the older sister and was first shown in The Boxcar Children. She likes to take care of all her family members, including grandfather and Henry (they are older than her). She did all the cooking and housework when the kids were spending their summer in the barn in Surprise Island.
- J. K. Simmons as Dr. Moore: An old friend of the Alden family, he was first shown in The Boxcar Children, but made cameo appearances in this film. In The Boxcar Children, he helped the children meet with their grandfather, whom the children thought was mean and ran away from him.
- Martin Sheen as James Henry Alden: The grandfather of the children, he is a kind and wealthy man. He made his first appearance in The Boxcar Children. In The Boxcar Children, the children thought he was mean and had run away from him, but Dr. Moore helped to solve the misunderstanding.
- Gil Birmingham as Lonan Browning: An old friend of Joe, or John Joseph Alden, Joe used to work for him. Lonan was first introduced in this film.
- Dane DeHaan as John Joseph Alden, or simply Joe, is the cousin (or sometimes shown as uncle, because Joe's father was the children's grandfather's brother) of the children. He made his first appearance in this film. At first, he did not reveal that he is from the Alden family, because he was afraid of James Henry Alden because Joe had made James Henry Alden believe that Joe had died when he fell from a cliff. He helped Captain Daniel with chores around, and liked to spend time with the children. At last, when his identity was revealed to everyone, James Henry Alden made Joe the director of the Alden Museum.
- Griffin Gluck as Henry: The older brother and the oldest sibling, he was first shown in The Boxcar Children. He is very protective of his younger siblings. Henry is very good at making paper birds and wooden things. He worked to make arrangements in the barn. Gluck replaces Zachary Gordon from the first film.
- Talitha Bateman as Violet: The younger sister, she was first shown in The Boxcar Children. She likes to do painting and art and craft. She also knows how to play the violin as Joe taught her. Violet also helped Jessie to cook in the barn. Bateman replaces Mackenzie Foy from the first film.
- Stephen Stanton as Captain Daniel: A good friend of grandfather, he is shown to sail the motorboat from the mainland to Surprise Island. His first appearance is in this film. He also helped Joe to hide from grandfather.
- Carter Sand as Benny: The younger brother and the youngest sibling, he was first shown in The Boxcar Children. He is shown to be mischievous and claims Joe to be his best friend, even though Joe is their cousin. He likes to help his siblings in different chores. Sand replaces his older brother Jadon Sand from the first film.
- Davis Pak as Mike: Benny's friend, he is first shown in this film. Benny and Mike squabble a lot. His brother is Pat.
- Watch is the Alden's dog. He loves his family very much. He is also friends with Spotty, Pat and Mike's dog.
- Spotty is Pat and Mike's pet dog. He is friends with Watch.

== Reception ==
Renee Schonfeld of Common Sense Media awarded the film three stars out of five.
