= Gil Birmingham =

American actor (born 1953)

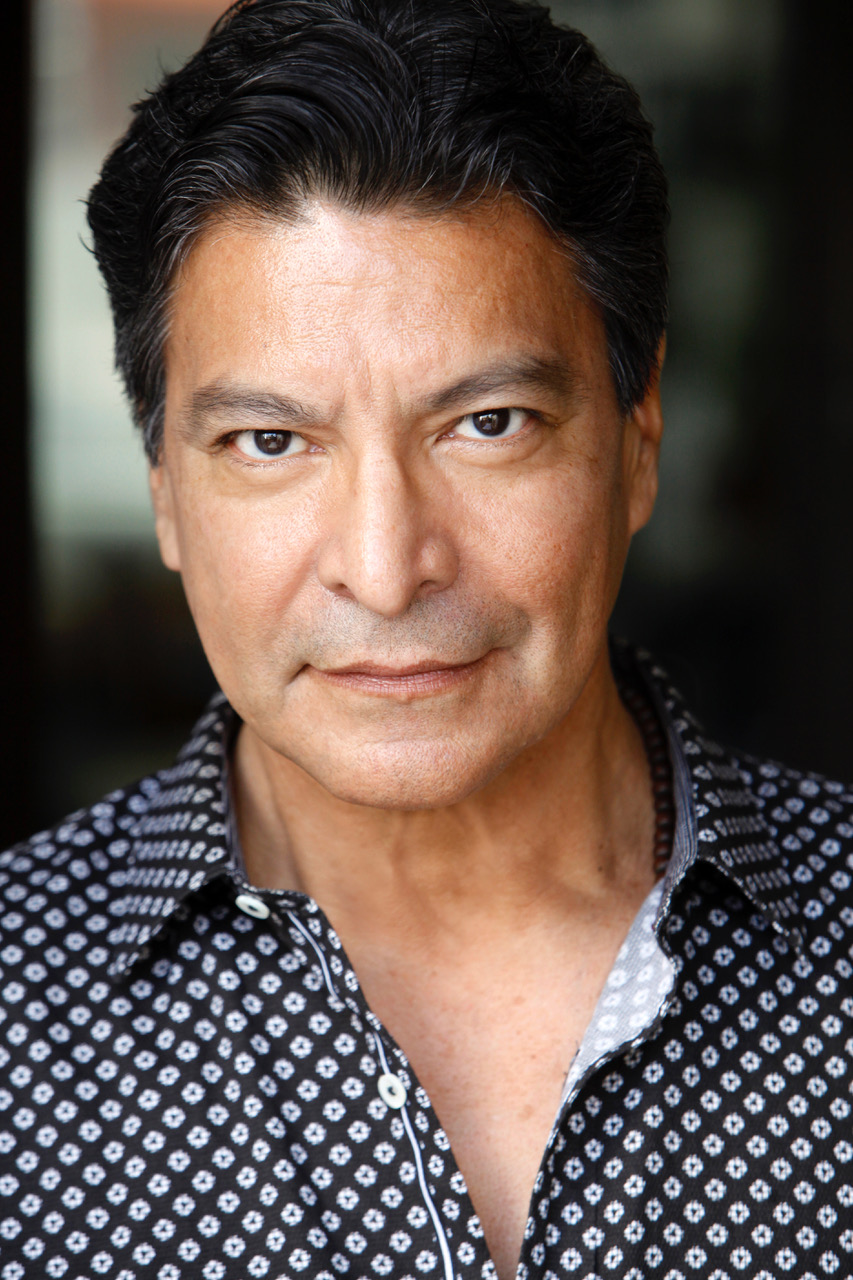
- Birmingham in 2017
- Born: Gilbert Birmingham; July 13, 1953 (age 73); San Antonio, Texas, U.S.
- Education: University of Southern California
- Occupation: Actor
- Years active: 1986–present
- Website: gilbirmingham.com

Gilbert Birmingham (born July 13, 1953) is an American film and television actor. He is known for his roles as Tribal Chairman Thomas Rainwater on the Paramount Network series Yellowstone (2018–2024) and the CBS series Marshals (2026–present), George Hunter on Banshee (2014), Virgil White on Unbreakable Kimmy Schmidt (2015–2017), and Billy Black in The Twilight Saga film series (2008–2012).

== Early life ==
Birmingham was born in San Antonio, Texas, on July 13, 1953, to Gilbert and Rebecca Birmingham. A 2018 Cowboys and Indians profile says that "he was born to a Comanche father and a mother of Spanish ancestry". His family moved frequently during his childhood due to his father's career in the military. Birmingham learned to play the guitar at an early age and considers music to be his "first love."

After obtaining a Bachelor of Science from the USC Price School of Public Policy, he worked as a petrochemical engineer, but later decided to become a bodybuilder and actor.

== Career ==
=== Music videos ===
In the early 1980s, a talent scout spotted Birmingham at a local gym, where he had been bodybuilding and entering bodybuilding contests, and recruited him for his first acting job, a music video for Diana Ross's 1982 hit song "Muscles".

=== Theme parks ===
After that music video, Birmingham began to pursue acting as his primary career, studying with Larry Moss and Charles Conrad. He portrayed the character of Conan the Barbarian in Universal Studios Hollywood's theme park attraction The Adventures of Conan: A Sword and Sorcery Spectacular.

=== Television ===
Birmingham made his television debut on an episode of the series Riptide. By 2002, he had a recurring role as the character Oz in the medical drama Body & Soul, starring Peter Strauss. In 2005, he was cast as the older Dogstar in the Steven Spielberg six-part miniseries Into the West 2006- Charmed Season 8 Episode 12. In 2018, he began portraying Chief Thomas Rainwater of the fictional Broken Rock Indian Reservation in Paramount Network's Yellowstone.

He has appeared in a number of other television series, including Animal Kingdom, Buffy the Vampire Slayer, Veronica Mars, 10 Items or Less, Nip/Tuck, Castle, The Mentalist, House of Cards, Unbreakable Kimmy Schmidt and Siren. He has also had roles in several television films, such as Gentle Ben (with Dean Cain) and Gentle Ben 2, Dreamkeeper, The Lone Ranger, and Love's Long Journey (with Erin Cottrell and Irene Bedard).

In 2022, Birmingham was cast as Detective Bill Taba, a Paiute man, in the mini-series Under the Banner of Heaven.

In February 2021, Birmingham was cast as Charlie Bass in the Netflix thriller series Pieces of Her, adapted from the Karin Slaughter novel of the same name.

=== Films ===
In 2001, Birmingham appeared in his first feature film, The Doe Boy, in which he portrayed Manny Deadmarsh.

In 2008, he was cast as the character Billy Black in The Twilight Saga film series. He performed in all five films.

The Twilight series led to other major film roles, including that of Sheriff Johnny Cortez in Love Ranch (with Joe Pesci and Helen Mirren), and Cal Bishnik in Shouting Secrets (with The Twilight Saga: New Moon castmate Chaske Spencer). In September 2011, Birmingham appeared in the film Crooked Arrows, cast in the role of Ben Logan.

Birmingham voiced Wounded Bird in the animated film Rango. He has provided voice work for the television series The Wild Thornberrys (in which he voiced an Inuk elder) and the film Night at the Museum.

He played the partnering Texas Ranger to Jeff Bridges' character in the 2016 bank robbery film Hell or High Water.

In the Chickasaw Nation production of Te Ata, Birmingham plays Thomas Benjamin 'T.B.' Thompson, the father of Mary Frances 'Te Ata' (Thompson) Fisher. Birmingham attended the film's premiere in Moore, Oklahoma, on September 13, 2016.

He was featured in The Space Between Us (2017) as Shaman Neka. He was featured as the father of an Arapaho girl who dies on their reservation in the 2017 film Wind River.

== Filmography ==
=== Film ===
Year	Title	Role	Notes
1987	House II: The Second Story	Featured Warrior	
1996	Le Jaguar	Kumare Bodyguard	
2001	The Doe Boy	Manny Deadmarsh	
2002	Skins	Sonny Yellow Lodge	
2005	End of the Spear	Moipa	Uncredited
2007	Cosmic Radio	Tribal Council Leader	
2008	Turok: Son of Stone	Nashoba (voice)	
2008	No Man's Land: The Rise of Reeker	Eaglesmith	
2008	Twilight	Billy Black	
2009	The Twilight Saga: New Moon	Billy Black	
2010	The Twilight Saga: Eclipse	Billy Black	
2010	Love Ranch	Sheriff Johnny Cortez	
2011	Rango	Wounded Bird (voice)	
2011	Shouting Secrets	Cal Bishnik	
2011	The Twilight Saga: Breaking Dawn – Part 1	Billy Black	
2011	California Indian	Charles "Chi" Thomas	
2012	Crooked Arrows	Ben Logan	
2012	The Twilight Saga: Breaking Dawn – Part 2	Billy Black	Credit only
2013	The Lone Ranger	Red Knee	
2014	The Boxcar Children	Lonan Browning (voice)	
2016	Hell or High Water	Alberto Parker	
2017	Wind River	Martin Hanson	
2017	The Space Between Us	Shaman Neka	
2017	Transformers: The Last Knight	Chief Sherman	
2018	The Boxcar Children: Surprise Island	Lonan Browning (voice)	
2018	Saint Judy	Michael Bowman	
2023	The Marsh King's Daughter	Clark	
TBA	Wind River: The Next Chapter	Martin Hanson	Post-production

=== Television ===
Year	Title	Role	Notes
1986	Riptide	Cop	Episode: "Chapel of Glass"
1987	Falcon Crest	Deputy	Episode: "Desperation"
1997	The Legend of Calamity Jane	Additional voices	13 episodes
1997	Buffy the Vampire Slayer	Peru Man	Episode: "Inca Mummy Girl"
1997	Night Man	Vargas	Episode: "I Left My Heart in San Francisco"
1997	Dr. Quinn, Medicine Woman	Brave #1	Episode: "Safe Passage"
1999	The Wild Thornberrys	Jim's Dad	Voice; Episode: "Tamper Proof Seal"
2001	Family Law	Bernard	Episode: "Americans"
2001	V.I.P.	Roland	Episode: "Uncle from V.A.L."
2002	Gentle Ben	Pete	Television film
2002	Body & Soul	Oz	8 episodes
2003	Gentle Ben 2	Pete	Television film
2003	The Lone Ranger	One Horn	Unsold television film
2003	Dreamkeeper	Sam	Television film
2005	Medical Investigation	Walter Shephard	Episode: "Tribe"
2005	Into the West	Older Dogstar	Television miniseries, 4 episodes
2005	Love's Long Journey	Sharp Claw	Television film
2006	Charmed	Indian Chief	Episode: "Payback's a Witch"
2006	Veronica Mars	Leonard Lobo	2 episodes
2009	Nip/Tuck	Shaman	Episode: "Budi Sabri"
2009	10 Items or Less	John Greene	Episode: "Dances with Groceries"
2010	Castle	Cacaw Te	Episode: "Wrapped Up in Death"
2010	The Mentalist	Markham Willis	Episode: "Aingavite Baa"
2012	The Lying Game	Ben Whitehorse	3 episodes
2012	Wilfred	Red Wolf	Episode: "Questions"
2012	Vegas	Don Simmons	2 episodes
2014	Banshee	George Hunter	5 episodes
2014	House of Cards	Daniel Lanagin	4 episodes
2015–2017	Unbreakable Kimmy Schmidt	Virgil	7 episodes
2016	Dr. Del	Crow	Television film
2017	Animal Kingdom	Pearce	Series regular (seasons 3-4)
2018–2020	Siren	Sheriff Dale Bishop	14 episodes
2018–2024	Yellowstone	Thomas Rainwater	Main role
2019	NCIS: Los Angeles	Navy Captain Steven Douglas	3 episodes
2021	Pieces of Her	Charlie Bass	6 episodes
2022	Under the Banner of Heaven	Bill Taba	Main role, 6 episodes (miniseries)
2024–present	X-Men '97	Daniel Lone Eagle / Forge	Voice; Main role (season 2), recurring role (season 1); 9 episodes
2024	Tracker	Gus McMillion	Episode: "Into the Wild"
2026	Marshals	Thomas Rainwater	Main role
2026	Dark Matter	Gabriel Vargas	2 episodes

=== Video games ===
Year	Title	Role
1999	Command & Conquer: Tiberian Sun	Ghostalker (voice)

== Awards and nominations ==
- 2001: The Doe Boy (in which Birmingham starred as Manny Deadmarsh) wins the Sundance International Filmmaker's Award
- 2002: First Americans in the Arts (FAITA) award for an Outstanding Performance in a Recurring Role as Oz in Body & Soul
- 2005: American Indian LA Film and Television Award for Outstanding Supporting Role as Sam in Dreamkeeper
