= Among Ravens =

- Film poster
- Directed by: Russell Friedenberg; Randy Redroad
- Written by: Russell Freidenberg
- Produced by: Teddy Grennan; Heather Rae; Dori Sperko
- Starring: Amy Smart; Joshua Leonard; Christian Campbell; Victoria Smurfit; Natalie Imbruglia; Will McCormack; Johnny Sequoyah; Russell Freidenberg
- Cinematography: Darren Genet
- Edited by: Randy Redroad; Terilyn A. Shropshire
- Music by: Will Bates & Fall On Your Sword; Steve Schiltz
- Production company: Iron Circle Pictures
- Distributed by: Gravitas Ventures
- Release date: June 29, 2014 (Nantucket)
- Running time: 103 minutes
- Country: United States
- Language: English

Among Ravens is a 2014 American comedy-drama film directed by Russell Friedenberg and Randy Redroad and starring Amy Smart, Joshua Leonard, Christian Campbell, Victoria Smurfit, Natalie Imbruglia, Will McCormack, Johnny Sequoyah and Freidenberg.

== Plot ==
The story of a group of friends who reunite for their annual 4 July weekend only to be confronted by Chad, a strange and beautiful nature photographer who begins to change their lives one by one.

== Cast ==
- Amy Smart as Wendy Conifer
- Joshua Leonard as Ellis Conifer
- Christian Campbell as Will Deville
- Russell Friedenberg as Saul King
- Victoria Smurfit as Emma
- Natalie Imbruglia as Madison
- Will McCormack as Chad Whitlock
- Johnny Sequoyah as Joey
- Castille Landon as Saturn Moon
- Calum Grant as Hal Rice
- Vinnie Duyck as Taxi Driver
- Christopher Pinkalla as Jay

== Reception ==
The film has a 10% rating on Rotten Tomatoes. Glenn Kenny of RogerEbert.com awarded the film one star.
