= Sydney Freeland =

Native American film director from New Mexico, U.S.

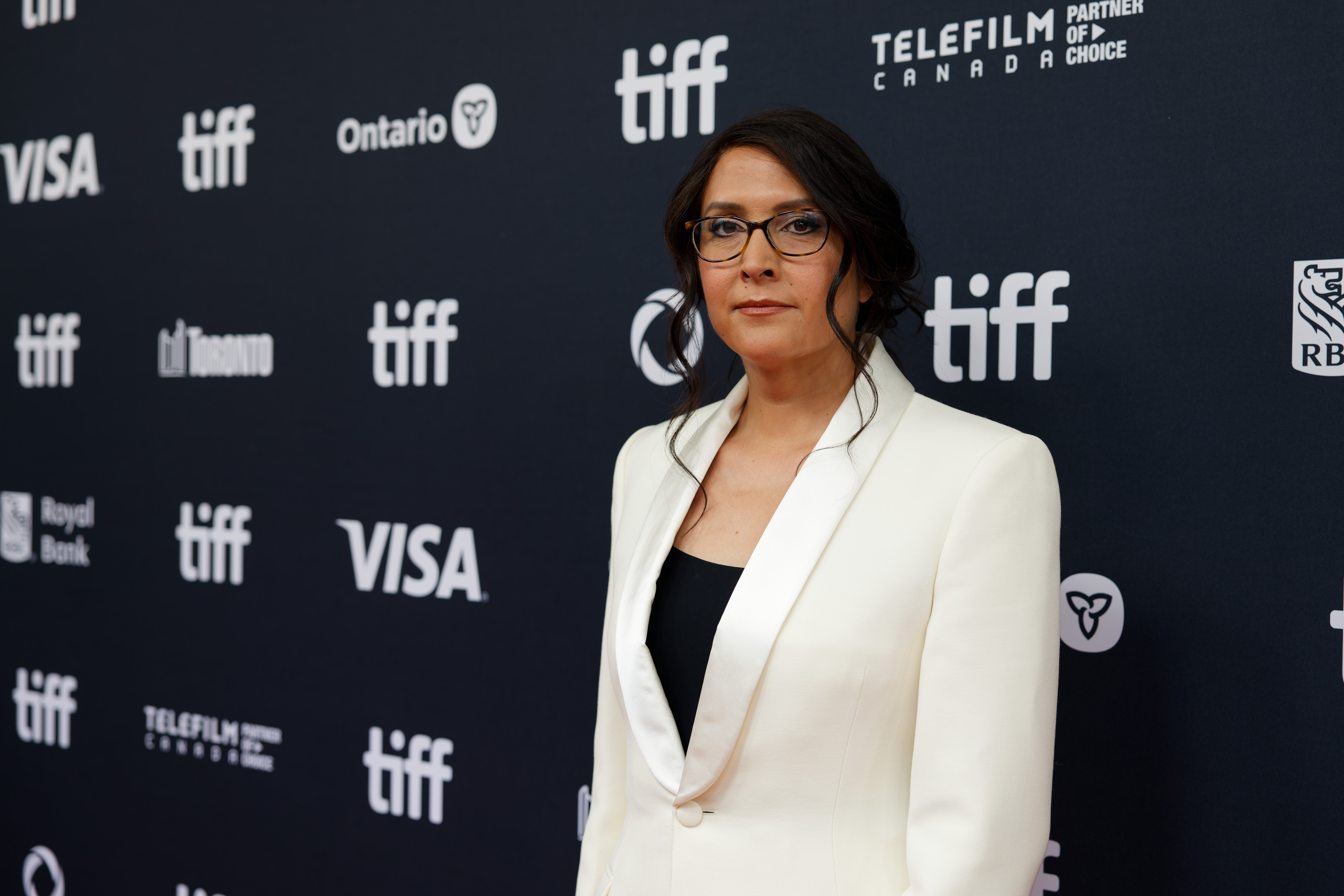
- Freeland in 2024
- Born: October 10, 1980 (age 45); Gallup, New Mexico, U.S.
- Citizenship: Navajo Nation, American
- Education: Academy of Art University, San Francisco
- Occupations: Director; Screenwriter
- Known for: Rez Ball (2024), Drunktown's Finest

Sydney Freeland (born October 29, 1980) is a Native American filmmaker. She is a citizen of the Navajo Nation.

She wrote and directed the film Drunktown's Finest (2014), which garnered numerous acclaims after premiering at the Sundance Film Festival. Her second film, Deidra & Laney Rob a Train, debuted at Sundance and was released on Netflix in 2017; her third, Rez Ball, released in 2024.

== Early life ==
Freeland was born in Gallup, New Mexico, in 1980 to a Navajo father and a Scottish mother, and she was raised on a Navajo Reservation. Freeland attended Academy of Art University in San Francisco and earned a Bachelor of Fine Arts in computer animation and a Master of Fine Arts in film. She is a 2004 Fulbright scholar, who focused her scholarship on a field study of Indigenous peoples in Ecuador. Freeland received a 2007 Disney Scholarship and was a 2008 Disney Fellowship semifinalist. Freeland is also a 2009 Sundance Institute Native Lab fellow.

== Career ==
Prior to making her first feature-length film, Drunktown's Finest, Freeland previously worked as a production assistant, as a writer and as a camera intern. Freeland worked for a number of different media companies, including The Food Network, Walt Disney, Comedy Central, and National Geographic. Freeland directed a six-minute short, Hoverboard, utilizing Kickstarter to help fund the short. The film was inspired by Back to the Future Part II. Drunktown's Finest is her second venture into filmmaking. The 95-minute-long film is a coming-of-age story about the complex issues surrounding identity and the struggles faced by Native American people. The film's name is inspired by a controversial 20/20 segment on ABC News, which branded the town of Gallup, New Mexico "Drunk Town, USA", after the increase of instances of alcoholism on the border of the Navajo Nation. Freeland wrote and directed Drunktown's Finest as a way to combat negative stereotypes of her home community. Freeland, who is herself a transgender woman, also directed a digital series about queer and trans women called Her Story. The series was nominated for the newly created Emmy Award category of Outstanding Short Form Comedy or Drama.

In 2014 Freeland was named a United States Artists (USA) Fellow.

On March 19, 2022, Freeland joined as a director for the upcoming superhero streaming series Echo for Disney+. In 2022, she was included in the Fast Company Queer 50 list. In 2026 Freeland directed two episodes of the Netflix series Little House on the Prairie.

== Filmography ==
- 2008: The Migration (Short) - director
- 2012: Hoverboard (Short) - producer, writer, director
- 2014: Drunktown's Finest - screenwriter, director
- 2016: Her Story (Web Series) - director
- 2017: Deidra & Laney Rob a Train - director
- 2018–2019: Grey's Anatomy (TV series) - director (2 episodes)
- 2018: Heathers (TV series) - director (1 episode)
- 2019: Station 19 (TV series) - director (1 episode)
- 2019: Chambers (TV series) - director (1 episode)
- 2019: Tales of the City (miniseries) - director (1 episode)
- 2019: Fear the Walking Dead (TV series) - director (1 episode)
- 2019: Impulse (TV series) - director (1 episode)
- 2019: Emergence (TV series) - director (1 episode)
- 2020: Nancy Drew (TV series) - director (2 episodes)
- 2020: P-Valley (TV series) - director (1 episode)
- 2020: The Wilds (TV series) - director (1 episode)
- 2021: Rutherford Falls (TV series) - director (4 episodes)
- 2021: Reservation Dogs (TV series) - director (2 episodes)
- 2022–2026: Star Trek: Strange New Worlds (TV series) - director (2 episodes)
- 2024: Echo (TV series) - executive producer, director (4 episodes)
- 2024: Rez Ball - screenwriter, director
- 2025: Resident Alien (TV series) - director (2 episodes)
- 2026: Little House on the Prairie (Netflix) - director (2 episodes)

== Awards and nominations ==
Award	Year	Project	Category	Result
Ashland Independent Film Festivals	2014	Drunktown's Finest	Narrative Feature - Honorable Mention	Won
Heartland Film Festivals	2014	Drunktown's Finest	Narrative Feature	Won
L.A. Outfest	2014	Drunktown's Finest	Outstanding American Narrative Feature	Won
L.A. Outfest	2014	Drunktown's Finest	HBO Outstanding First Narrative Feature	Won
Albuquerque Film & Media Experience	2014	Drunktown's Finest	Best of New Mexico	Won
American Indian Film Festival	2014	Drunktown's Finest	Best Film	Won
American Indian Film Festival	2014	Drunktown's Finest	Best Supporting Actress	Won
American Indian Film Festival	2014	Drunktown's Finest	Best Actor	Nominated
American Indian Film Festival	2014	Drunktown's Finest	Best Director	Nominated
American Indian Film Festival	2014	Drunktown's Finest	Best Actress	Nominated
American Indian Film Festival	2014	Drunktown's Finest	Best Actor	Nominated
Primetime Emmy Awards	2016	Her Story	Outstanding Short Form Comedy or Drama Series	Nominated

== See also ==
- List of transgender film and television directors
