= The Boxcar Children (film) =

2014 American animated film

- Film poster
- Directed by: Daniel Chuba; Mark A.Z. Dippe; Kyungho Jo
- Screenplay by: Justin Merz; Zack Strauss
- Story by: Gertrude Chandler Warner
- Produced by: Daniel Chuba; Mark A.Z. Dippe
- Starring: Zachary Gordon; Joey King; Jadon Sand; Mackenzie Foy; D.B. Sweeney; J. K. Simmons; Martin Sheen
- Edited by: Michael Rafferty
- Music by: Kenneth Burgomaster
- Production company: Hammerhead Productions
- Distributed by: Phase 4 Films
- Release dates: April 8, 2014 (TIFF Kids); August 25, 2014
- Running time: 86 minutes
- Country: United States
- Language: English
- Budget: $5 million

The Boxcar Children is a 2014 American independent animated adventure film based on the book of the same name by Gertrude Chandler Warner.

== Plot ==
The Boxcar Children tells the story of four orphaned children: Henry, Jessie (or Jess), Violet, and Benny, who have evidently been orphaned for some time.

They come to a bakery to buy some bread, and ask to stay for the night. When Mr. and Mrs. Chandler, the local bakers, learn that the children are orphans, they plan to take in the three elder children, who are big enough to be useful in the bakery, but to send little Benny to a Children's Home. The children overhear the couple talking about this, and escape from the bakery. The bakers decide to chase them but then leave the children to go on their own.

Finding an abandoned boxcar, the children start a new life of independence. Henry ends up working various odd jobs in a nearby town Silver City for a doctor, named Dr. Moore, in order to earn money for food and other materials they need. He also does gardening for the doctor's mother. The children also find a Wire Fox Terrier and they name him Watch. The children's lives are pleasant and full of hard work until Violet becomes ill and they go to Dr. Moore's office for assistance.

Unbeknownst to the children, by that time Dr. Moore knows very well who they are and where they are living; indeed, he has been keeping a discreet eye on them for weeks. Their grandfather, who lives nearby, has been advertising in the papers, offering a reward for news of them, but Dr. Moore hasn't wanted to spoil the children's fun by informing on them. When Violet becomes ill, however, he feels it is time to do so.

Their grandfather, a steel baron, named James Henry Alden, comes at once to see them. The doctor suggests that he gets to know them first before telling them who he is, so he is simply introduced to them as a friend of the doctor's. The children warm to his kindness and are surprised but delighted when they eventually learn that he is their much feared grandfather (but the children had been brought up to fear their grandfather, whom they had never met, because he did not approve of their parents' marriage). They go to live with him after all, and he has the boxcar transferred to his backyard for their enjoyment.

== Voice cast ==
- Zachary Gordon as Henry Alden: A 14-year-old boy and the older brother, he is the oldest sibling of all. He used to work for Dr. Moore for money. He also won the Field Day Free-For-All race. He is very caring for his younger siblings.
- Joey King as Jessie Alden: A 13-year-old girl and the older sister, she often makes right decisions and takes care of Henry, Violet and Benny the most. She was also the one to spot the boxcar at the first place. She became the houseworker of the boxcar. As she took out the thorn from Watch's (their dog) foot, Watch treats her as his master, but he likes everyone.
- Mackenzie Foy as Violet Alden: A 10-year-old girl and the younger sister, she loves the color purple and violet. When she and her siblings lived in the boxcar, she helped to cook and do chores. When she fell ill, Dr. Moore took her to his house. Violet likes to take care for Benny.
- Jadon Sand as Benny Alden: A 6-year-old boy and the younger brother, he is also the youngest of all. He is shown to have interest in lots of fairy tales. He loves to play with Watch. While they were in the boxcar, Benny helped around in doing improvements. He also got a teddy bear from Violet that he named Stockings (because the bear was made out of stockings). He is also very naughty.
- Martin Sheen as James Henry Alden: The grandfather of Henry, Jessie, Violet and Benny, at first the kids were afraid of him, so they ran away, but later on, when he came to visit Dr. Moore when Violet was ill, the kids got to know that he is very nice and so they came to live with their grandfather. As the kids missed their boxcar, grandfather gifted them by getting the boxcar in their backyard. Grandfather also hosts the Field Day competition in Silver City.
- J. K. Simmons as Dr. Moore: The doctor for whom Henry worked, Dr. Moore is a kind man. He also took care of Violet when she was sick. Dr. Moore is the same person who met the children with their grandfather.
- Illeana Douglas as Mary Moore: Dr. Moore's houseworker, she is the one who did the cooking and other jobs of Dr. Moore's house. She also took care of the children when Violet was sick.
- D. B. Sweeney as the baker, the owner of the Chandler's Bakery, where the kids decided to stay for the night at the start of the film. When he decided to send Benny away, the kids ran away.
- Audrey Wasilewski as the baker's wife, who is the owner of the Chandler's Bakery, where the kids decided to stay for the night at the start of the film. She is rather bossy.
- Watch is the pet dog that the kids found in the woods, while they were living in the boxcar. He really loves the children.

== Sequel ==
A sequel film, The Boxcar Children: Surprise Island, was originally planned to be released in the end of 2017, but Fathom Events released the film in select theatres on May 8, 2018, followed by a DVD release on August 14 the same year.
