= The Doe Boy =

2001 film by Randy Redroad

- Directed by: Randy Redroad
- Written by: Randy Redroad
- Produced by: Anthony J. Vozza; Chris Eyre (executive producer); Jennifer Easton
- Starring: James Duval; Kevin Anderson; Jeri Arredondo; Gordon Tootoosis; Jude Herrera
- Cinematography: László Kadar
- Edited by: Matthew Booth
- Music by: Adam Dorn aka Mocean Worker
- Production companies: Easton LTD. Partnership; Curb Entertainment
- Distributed by: Wellspring (U.S.)
- Release date: 2001
- Running time: 87 minutes
- Country: United States
- Language: English

The Doe Boy is a 2001 independent drama film written and directed by Randy Redroad and produced by filmmaker, Chris Eyre. It was selected as part of the 2000 Sundance Institute/NHK International Filmmakers Award to Redroad. Its lead cast was assembled by casting director, Rene Haynes.

== Plot ==
Set in 1984 in the heart of the Cherokee Nation of Oklahoma, The Doe Boy tells the coming of age story of Hunter (James Duval), a young man of mixed heritage who is also a haemophiliac.

== Cast ==
- James Duval as Hunter
- Kevin Anderson as Hank Kirk
- Jeri Arredondo as Maggie Kirk
- Andrew J. Ferchland as Young Hunter
- Gordon Tootoosis as Marvin Fishinghawk
- Jude Herrera as Geri
- Jim Metzler as Dr. Moore
- Nathaniel Arcand as Junior
- Robert A. Guthrie as Cheekie
- Gil Birmingham as Manny
- Alex Rice as Bird
- Orvel Baldridge as Oliver
- Kyle White as Young Junior

== Awards and nominations ==
- Sundance/NHK International Filmmaker's Award
- Taos Talking Pictures - Best First Time Director
- Wine Country Film Festival - Best First Feature, Best Actor (James Duval)
- Great Plains Film Festival - Best Feature
- Deauville American Film Festival 2001 - Official Competition
- IFP/Gotham Open Palm Award - Outstanding Directorial Debut - Finalist
- Perrier Bubbling Under Award - Finalist
- Galway Film Fleadh - Best First Time Director Co-Winner
- First Nations Film Festival, Montreal - Grand Prize
- Great Plains Film Festival - Best Feature
- Empire State Film Festival - Grand Prize
- Route 66 Film Festival, Chicago Best Feature With Diversity Emphasis
- American Indian Film Festival - Best Film, Best Director, Best Actor (James Duval), Best Actress (Jeri Arredondo) Best Supporting Actress (Jude Herrera)
