= Nathaniel Arcand =

Canadian actor

- Born: November 13, 1971 (age 54); Edmonton, Alberta, Canada
- Occupation: Actor
- Years active: 1994–present
- Spouse: Jolene Arcand

Nathaniel Arcand (born November 13, 1971) is a Canadian actor. He is known for his first major role in the Canadian drama series North of 60, in which for three seasons he played William MacNeil, a smart-mouthed, cocky, troubled, and misunderstood teen. In 1997, he was nominated for a Gemini Award in the category "Best Performance by an Actor in a Featured Supporting Role in a Dramatic Series" for the North of 60 episode "Traces and Tracks."

== Life and career ==
He was raised in Edmonton, Alberta. He is Nēhilawē (Plains Cree), from the Buffalo Lake Metis Settlement. Essential supports throughout his life are Nathaniel's mother and his great grandparents. Nathaniel has one daughter, Trisha O'Chiese, and two sons, Jaden Plaizier and Griffin Powell-Arcand. Griffin is also an actor.

One of Arcand's most recent roles is Mato Summerhill in My Life with the Walter Boys, a Netflix TV series. One of Arcand's longest running roles is that of Scott Cardinal on the CBC series Heartland. Also in television, Nathaniel portrays Victor Merasty on Blackstone, "an unmuted exploration of First Nations’ power and politics" set in a small Plains Cree community. In one of his latest film roles, Arcand portrays Nathan in the comedic drama Two Indians Talking, which won the 2010 Vancouver International Film Festival Most Popular Canadian Film Award.

In 2025 he was announced as having a supporting role in the upcoming television series adaptation of Bon Cop, Bad Cop.

== Filmography ==
=== Films ===
Year	Film	Role	Notes
1994	Savage Land	Tree Climber	
1996	Stone Coats	Lil Crow	Not released
1996	Crazy Horse	Little Hawk	Based on a true story
1998	The Legend of Two Path	Wanchese	
1999	My Brother	Billy	Short film
1999	Chasing Indigo	Tom	
1999	Grey Owl	Ned White Bear	Based on a true story
2000	The Doe Boy	Junior	
2001	Speaking of Sex	Calvin	
2001	American Outlaws	Comanche Tom	
2001	Virtual Insanity	Daniel	Short film
2002	Skins	Young Mogie	
2003	Ginger Snaps Back: The Beginning	Hunter	
2003	Black Cloud	Jimmy	
2004	BIGFOOT, The Unknown Territory	John Eagleheart	
2005	From Cherry English	Traylor	Short film
2005	Elektra	Ninja #1	
2006	Pathfinder	Wind in Tree	
2010	Two Indians Talking	Nathan	
2017	Dead Again in Tombstone	Bull Dog	
2019	Cold Pursuit	Smoke	
2020	Monkey Beach	Albert	
2020	Indian Road Trip	Billy	
2021	Portraits from a Fire	Gord	
2023	Killers of the Flower Moon	Ancestor Warrior	
2024	The Birds Who Fear Death	Don	
2025	Train Dreams	Ignatius Jack	
2025	Sinners	Chayton	

=== Television ===
Year	Film	Role	Notes
1994–1997	North of 60	William MacNeil	
1996	Due South	David	Episode "The Mask"
2002	Grandpa and Me	Grandpa	Short film
2002	Caitlin's Way	Deputy Garth Crowchild	
2002	Jeremiah	Shashona	Episode "Man of Iron, Woman Under Glass"
2002	Before We Ruled the Earth	Gll-AAK	
2003	100 Days in the Jungle	A Navajo from Utah	
2003	The Lone Ranger	Tonto	
2003	Da Vinci's Inquest	Vern Walker	
2002	Wildfire7: The Inferno	Red	
2004	Dreamkeeper	Broken Lance	
2004	Smallville	Jeremiah Holdsclaw	Season 3, episode "Talisman"
2005	Into the West	Brings Horse	
2005	Da Vinci's City Hall	Cage	Season 1, "Isn't Very Pretty But You Can Smoke It" (episode 3), "One Man, Two Jobs" (episode 4), "Put Down the Hose, Pick Up a Gun" (episode 5)
2005	Waking Up Wally: The Walter Gretzky Story	Paramedic	
2005	Johnny Tootall	RT	
2006	Clean Fight	Trevor	
2006	Northern Town	Georgee	
2007	Montana Sky	Adam Wolfchild	
2007	Moose TV	Clifford Matthew	
2009	Murdoch Mysteries	Jimmy	Season 2, Episode 12: "Werewolves"
2007–2019, 2021, 2022	Heartland	Scott Cardinal	Main role seasons 1–4; Recurring role seasons 5–11, 15-16
2011	Blackstone	Victor Merasty	Season 1, 9 episodes: "Future, What Future?", "A New Beginning", "White Bread Red Class", "Suffer the Children", "Ditch Monkey", "Daddy's Home", "Bingo Night", "Push Pull Twist Turn", "Time's Up" Relevant content to Aboriginal Peoples Television Network
2012	Longmire	Avo	Pilot
2013	Arctic Air	Bruce Ward	Season 2, 5 episodes: "Bombs Away", "Open Season", "There's Gold in Them Thar Hills", "Hell Hath No Fury", "Ts'inada",
2017	Frontier	Wahush	Season 2, 3 episodes: "The Wolf and the Bear", "Cannonball", "Return of the Wolf"
2017	Bull	Makya "Mack" Benally	Season 2, Episode 5: "Play the Hand You're Dealt"
2017	Supernatural	Derek Swan	Season 13, Episode 9: "The Bad Place"
2019	FBI	Special Agent Clinton Skye	Guest Role
2019	Black Summer	Governale	Recurring Role, 3 Episodes
2020	FBI: Most Wanted	Special Agent Clinton Skye	Main Role, 17 Episodes
2023	My Life with the Walter Boys	Mato Summerhill	Recurring Role, 5 Episodes
2024	Avatar: The Last Airbender	Chief Arnook	2 episodes
2026	Bon Cop, Bad Cop	Chief Georges Condo	

== Awards and recognition ==
- Best Supporting Actor, American Indian Film Festival 2005 for Johnny Tootall
- Performing Arts Award, Aboriginal Role Models of Alberta 2006
- Best Actor Nomination, Winnipeg Aboriginal Film Festival 2010 for Two Indians Talking
- Best Actor Nomination, American Indian Motion Picture 2010 for Two Indians Talking

== Trivia ==
Nathaniel Arcand is a lead character in both the film Two Indians Talking by director Sara McIntyre and in the television series Blackstone. In both the film and the television series, he shares the screen with two of the same actors: Carmen Moore and Justin Rain.
