= Johnny Tootall =

- Written by: Shirley Cheechoo; Andrew Genaille; Michael Giampa
- Directed by: Shirley Cheechoo
- Starring: Adam Beach; Nathaniel Arcand; Alex Rice; Sheila Tousey; Ben Cotton
- Theme music composer: Rich Walters
- Country of origin: Canada
- Original language: English

Production
- Producers: Cynthia Chapman; Stephen Hegyes; Danielle Prohom Olson; Shawn Williamson
- Cinematography: Brian Johnson
- Editor: Lenka Svab

Original release
- Release: 2005

Johnny Tootall is a 2005 television film written and directed by Shirley Cheechoo. The film stars Adam Beach as the titular Johnny Tootall, a young First Nations man who joins the Canadian army to fight in the Bosnian War, in a bid to avoid the responsibility of taking on the role of hereditary chief of his community.

The film was shot around Vancouver Island, British Columbia with the Ahousaht Nations people.

It won "Best Film" honors at the 2005 American Indian Film Festival.

== Cast ==
- Adam Beach as Johnny Tootall
- Nathaniel Arcand as RT
- Alex Rice as Serena
- Sheila Tousey as Agnes (as Sheila May Tousey)
- Ben Cotton as Henry
- Miranda Frigon as Luke
- Shawn Reis as Lloyd
- Randi Knighton as Tiffany
- Jazmine Charleson as Dancer 1
- Shyanne Samuel as Dancer 2
- Kathleen Ambrose as Dancer 3
- Francine Charleson as Dancer 4
