= Desert Cathedral =

- Directed by: Travis Gutiérrez Senger
- Written by: Travis Gutiérrez Senger
- Produced by: Michael J. Mouncer; Chip Hourihan; Travis Gutiérrez Senger
- Starring: Lee Tergesen; Chaske Spencer; Petra Wright
- Cinematography: Michael Ragen
- Edited by: Marc Vives and Oriana Soddu
- Music by: Danny Bensi and Saunder Jurriaans
- Distributed by: Random Media
- Release date: May 14, 2014 (Seattle)
- Running time: 85 minutes
- Country: United States
- Language: English

Desert Cathedral is a 2014 drama written, produced and directed by Travis Gutiérrez Senger. The film stars Lee Tergesen and Chaske Spencer, and won awards at festivals in New York, Manchester, and Naples. Utilizing found footage in a dramatic narrative, the film follows a broken real estate developer (Tergesen) who mysteriously disappears into the Southwest in 1992, leaving behind a series of VHS tapes to his employer and family.

== Release ==
The film was released theatrically by Random Media and The Orchard on September 27, 2016.

== Reception ==
Film critic, Eric Lavallee, describes the film as a "bone-chilling... hybrid". Tergesen's performance especially has been praised by film critics.
