= Edge of the World (2018 film) =

- Directed by: Randy Redroad
- Starring: Richard T. Jones; Trevor St. John; Will Meyers; Megan Dalby
- Edited by: Randy Redroad
- Release dates: May 5, 2018 (Dallas Film Festival); March 2, 2019 (Amarillo, Texas)
- Country: United States
- Language: English

Edge of the World is a 2018 American drama film directed by Randy Redroad and starring Richard T. Jones, Trevor St. John, Will Meyers and Megan Dalby. the film premiered at the Dallas International Film Festival.

== Cast ==
- Noah Alford
- Megan Dalby
- Jonathan Daviss
- Stephanie Felton
- Austin Filson
- Richard T. Jones
- Jeff Justus
- Rex Linn
- Juan Martinez
- Will Meyers
- Mollie Milligan
- Trevor St. John

== Release ==
The film premiered at the 2018 Dallas International Film Festival. On March 2, 2019, it was shown at the Globe-News Center for the Performing Arts in Amarillo, Texas.

== Reception ==
Ayurella Horn-Muller of Film Threat awarded the film 6.5 stars out of 10.
