= Chris Eyre =

Native American film director

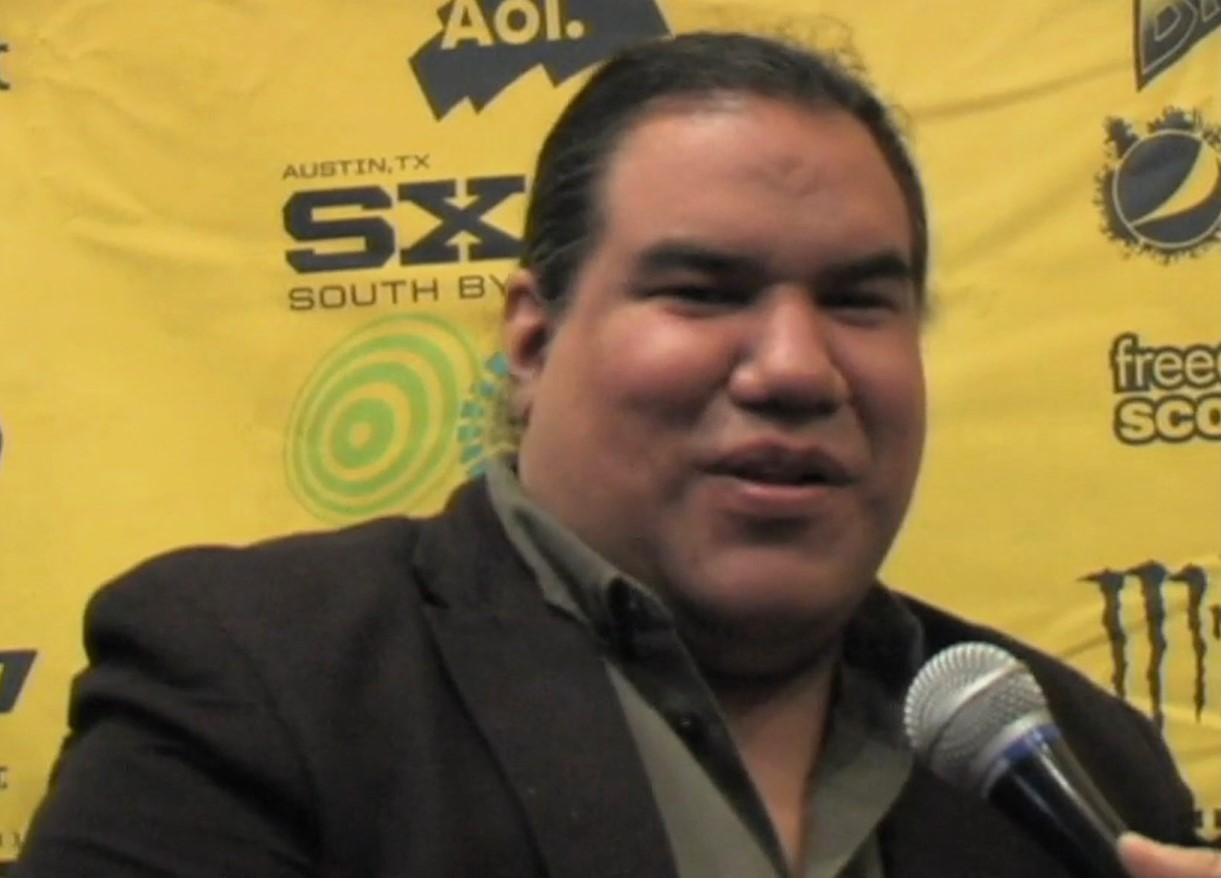
- Eyre at South by Southwest in 2011
- Born: 1968 (age 57–58); Portland, Oregon, United States
- Citizenship: Cheyenne and Arapaho Tribes, United States
- Education: New York University (MFA)
- Occupations: Film director, film producer
- Years active: 1994-present

Chris Eyre (born 1968) is a Native American film director and producer. He is an enrolled citizen of the Cheyenne and Arapaho Tribes, and known for works focused on Native American people and culture including Smoke Signals (1998), Skins (2002) and Dark Winds (premiered 2022)

== Early life and education ==
Chris Eyre was born in Portland, Oregon, and raised in Klamath Falls by his adoptive parents, Earl and Barbara Eyre. Despite his non-native upbringing, he is an enrolled citizen of the Cheyenne and Arapaho Tribes of Oklahoma. During his time at Klamath Union High School, from which he graduated in 1987, Eyre developed an interest in black-and-white photography, leading him to pursue further education in television production at Mt. Hood Community College in Gresham, Oregon. After completing his studies there, he earned a Bachelor of Arts in Media Arts from the University of Arizona in 1991. His passion for storytelling brought him to New York University Tisch School of the Arts, where he pursued a Master of Fine Arts in filmmaking from 1992 to 1995. His second-year film, Tenacity (1994), garnered attention at various film festivals, including Sundance.

== Career ==
=== Breakthrough ===
In 1998, Chris Eyre worked on two film projects. His first release was Things We Do (1998). Eyre's breakthrough came with his direction of Smoke Signals (1998), a film developed from a Sundance directing workshop and later bought by Miramar Films. Winning the Sundance Film Festival Filmmakers Trophy and the Audience Award, the film was noted for being the first nationally distributed feature film directed, written, co-produced, and prominently featuring American Indian actors. It also won "Best Film" honors at the 1998 American Indian Film Festival. Eyre described Smoke Signals as a film about the universal theme of forgiveness, which he believed would resonate with audiences for years.

=== Subsequent works ===
Following his initial success, Eyre directed several other significant films such as Skins (2002), which was shot on the Pine Ridge Reservation, and Edge of America (2003), which won a Peabody Award.

Eyre's second film, Skins (2002), is the story of two brothers on the Pine Ridge Reservation, a tribal cop and a Vietnam vet battling alcohol and emotional problems. He said at a screening: "The only thing you get in making period pieces about Indians is guilt. I'm interested in doing what non-Indian filmmakers can't do, which is portray contemporary Indians."

Eyre's Edge of America (2004) was the 2004 Sundance Film Festival "opening night" film. Edge of America (2004) is loosely based on the true story of a black English teacher who goes to the Three Nations Reservation to teach, but ends up coaching the very underachieving girls basketball team and takes them all the way to the state finals. In the process, he learns as much about their culture and race relations in America as they learn about winning and self-esteem. On January 29, 2006, Eyre won the Directors Guild of America's award for Outstanding Directorial Achievement in Children's Programs for Edge of America, becoming the first Native American to win the award.

Eyre's short film, A Thousand Roads (2005), the "signature film" for the Smithsonian's National Museum of the American Indian, opened in Washington, D.C., on April 10, 2005, for an unlimited and exclusive engagement. It is a contemporary film, following four American Indians in different locations, as they each confront everyday events.

In 2011, Eyre finished Hide Away (2011), collaborating with Salem writer Peter Vanderwal. His work, deeply reflective of his rural, Klamath Falls upbringing, often explores themes beyond Native American stories, focusing on universal human experiences and the spirit of living vicariously through varied characters. The film's cast includes Josh Lucas and Ayelet Zurer.

Other notable projects include The Doe Boy (2001) and Freedom Riders (2009).

=== Television and later projects ===
Eyre has also made contributions to television, directing episodes of popular series like Law & Order and Friday Night Lights.

Eyre has also directed two episodes of the famed PBS series Mystery!; A Thief of Time (2004) and Skinwalkers (2002) starring Adam Beach as Jim Chee, and Wes Studi as Joe Leaphorn. Both were executive produced by Robert Redford and based on the best selling Tony Hillerman novels. Skinwalkers (2002) is a mystery involving skinwalkers or shape-shifters, and the murders of several medicine men. A Thief of Time (2004) is a who-dunnit that intertwines very competitive anthropologists, possible artifact thievery, a missing professor, and the legend of the Anasazi.

In 2008 Eyre directed the first three episodes of We Shall Remain (2009), a mini-series that establishes Native history as an essential part of American history from PBS's acclaimed history series American Experience.

In 2017, Eyre is reported to be working on a documentary on "racism in New Mexico", with his starting point being the monument to Juan de Oñate in Alcalde, New Mexico, whose foot was cut off in 1997.

In recent years, Eyre has been involved in the Navajo noir series Dark Winds, which premiered on AMC+ in 2022. Serving as an executive producer and director, Eyre has worked alongside notable figures such as Robert Redford and George R.R. Martin. The series represents a shift towards television for telling Native stories, a medium where Eyre believes there has been a significant opportunity for Native voices to be heard.

== Style and themes ==
Chris Eyre's directorial style is characterized by its poignant storytelling, rich character development, and deep respect for cultural values. His films often address issues of identity, redemption, and the complexities of Native American life in modern America.

== Personal life ==
Chris Eyre's upbringing in Klamath Falls with his adoptive parents instilled in him a love for the rural aesthetics and simple pleasures of life, such as driving pickups. His search for his birth mother, Rose Lumpmouth, and discovery of his roots have profoundly impacted his personal life and professional work, infusing his projects with themes of identity, belonging, and reconciliation. Eyre is known for his dedication to his heritage and cultural advocacy, actively participating in initiatives that promote Native American culture and education. His personal experiences and background not only shape his filmmaking perspective but also drive his commitment to telling stories that resonate with authenticity and depth.

== Legacy and impact ==
Chris Eyre is considered a pivotal figure in Native American cinema. His work has not only contributed to a greater understanding and appreciation of Native American cultures in mainstream media but has also inspired a new generation of Native American filmmakers.

== Awards and honors ==
Chris Eyre received the 2024 Creative Capital Award in Film to develop The Land Acknowledgement Streaming Experience (L.A.S.E.), a 100 hour continuous video stream of a journey around U.S. roadways shot from the window of a moving vehicle that details each Native American community, landscape, territory, and stories along the way.

Chris Eyre was named a 2007 USA Rockefeller Foundation Fellow and awarded a $50,000 grant by United States Artists, a public charity that supports and promotes the work of American artists.

Chris Eyre was appointed as chairman of the film department at the Santa Fe University of Art and Design as of January 2012.

== Filmography ==
Short film

- A Thousand Roads (2005)
- Ishi's Return (2016)
- Memories of Miss O'Keeffe (2017)

=== Feature film ===
Year	Title	Director	Co-Producer
1998	Smoke Signals	Yes	Yes
2002	Skins	Yes	Yes
2011	Hide Away	Yes	No

Producer

- The Doe Boy (2001)
- Imprint (2007)
- California Indian (2011)

Executive producer

- The Seventh Fire (2015)
- Fourplay (2018)

=== Television ===
TV movies

Year	Title	Director	Producer
2002	Skinwalkers	Yes	No
2003	A Thief of Time	Yes	No
2004	Edge of America	Yes	Yes

TV series

Year	Title	Director	Producer	Notes
2008	Law & Order: Special Victims Unit	Yes	No	Episode "Smut"
2008–2011	Friday Night Lights	Yes	No	Episodes "Keeping Up Appearances" and "Gut Check"
2009	We Shall Remain	Yes	Yes	Episodes "After the Mayflower", "Tecumseh's Vision" and "Trail of Tears"
2010	Native Century	Yes	No	Episode "Pilot"
2022	How to Change Your Mind	No	Yes	Episode "Mescaline"
2022–present	Dark Winds	Yes	Executive	13 episodes
