= White Lines and the Fever: The Death of DJ Junebug =

- Directed by: Travis Gutiérrez Senger
- Written by: Travis Gutiérrez Senger; Mark Skillz
- Release date: May 21, 2010 (SIFF)
- Country: United States
- Language: English

White Lines and the Fever: The Death of DJ Junebug is a 2010 documentary film directed by Travis Gutiérrez Senger.

== Festivals ==
- South by Southwest - Austin, Texas
- Tribeca Film Festival - New York City, New York
- Seattle International Film Festival - Seattle, Washington
- Palm Springs International Film Festival - Palm Springs, California
- Rhode Island International Film Festival - Providence, Rhode Island
- Bumbershoot Music and Arts Festival - Seattle
- Chicago International Film Festival - Chicago, Illinois

== Awards ==
- Tribeca Film Festival 2010 - Grand Jury Prize
- South by Southwest 2010 - Special Jury Prize
- Seattle International Film Festival 2010 - Grand Jury Prize
- Rhode Island Film Festival 2010 - Grand Jury Prize
