= Christmas in the Clouds =

2001 film by Kate M. Barker

- Directed by: Kate Montgomery
- Written by: Kate Montgomery
- Starring: Timothy Vahle; Sam Vlahos; Mariana Tosca; M. Emmet Walsh; Graham Greene; Sheila Tousey; Rita Coolidge; Rosalind Ayres
- Edited by: Maysie Hoy; Allan Baumgarten
- Distributed by: Random Ventures
- Release dates: January 2001 (Sundance); December 2, 2005
- Running time: 96 minutes
- Country: United States
- Language: English
- Budget: $3 million
- Box office: $279,225

Christmas in the Clouds is a 2001 romantic comedy film about a ski resort owned and operated by a Native American tribe. Featured at the 2001 Sundance Film Festival, the film went on to receive Best Competition Feature Film at the Austin Film Festival and Best Native American-Theme Film at the Santa Fe Film Festival. The film was released in theaters and on DVD in 2005.

== Cast ==
- Timothy Vahle as Ray Clouds on Fire
- Sam Vlahos as Joe Clouds on Fire
- Mariana Tosca as Tina Littlehawk
- M. Emmet Walsh as Stu O'Malley
- Graham Greene as Earl
- Sheila Tousey as Mary
- Rita Coolidge as Ramona
- Rosalind Ayres as Mabel
- Wes Studi as himself

== Awards ==
Year	Award	Recipients	Category	Result
2001	Austin Film Festival	Kate Montgomery (director/writer)	Best Competition Feature Film	Won
2001	Santa Fe Film Festival	Kate Montgomery	Best Native American-Themed Film	Won

== See also ==
- List of Christmas films
