= Two Indians Talking =

- Directed by: Sara McIntyre
- Written by: Andrew Genaille
- Produced by: Nancy Baye; Darlene Choo; Michael De Sadeleer
- Starring: Nathaniel Arcand; Justin Rain; Carmen Moore; Denyc; Sam Bob; Ashley Harry
- Cinematography: Les Erskine
- Edited by: Elifer Santos
- Music by: Tracey Draper
- Production company: Kiss Dust Pictures
- Release date: 6 October 2010 (Vancouver International Film Festival)
- Running time: 97 minutes
- Country: Canada
- Language: English

Two Indians Talking (initially titled Discussing Mr. Darcy) is a 2010 Canadian comedy-drama film directed by Sara McIntyre, starring Nathaniel Arcand, Justin Rain, Carmen Moore, Denyc, Sam Bob and Ashley Harry.

== Cast ==
- Nathaniel Arcand as Nathan
- Justin Rain as Adam
- Carmen Moore as Sue
- Denyc as Tara
- Sam Bob as Arthur
- Ashley Harry as Janine

== Release ==
The film premiered at the Vancouver International Film Festival on 6 October 2010.

== Reception ==
Rob Nelson of Variety wrote that the film "benefits immeasurably from Andrew Genaille’s peppy writing and the nimble direction of Sara McIntyre, who keeps the comedic drama visually compelling despite its being set mostly in a single room."

Glen Schaefer of The Province gave the film a grade of "C" and wrote that the film "plays more like a series of interconnected essays than as on-screen drama." Sara McIntyre of The Globe and Mail rated the film 2 stars out of 4 and wrote that it "feels a little forced, a little too preachy, and there are some real eye-rolling moments".
