= Winter in the Blood (film) =

- Directed by: Alex Smith; Andrew J. Smith
- Written by: Alex Smith; Andrew J. Smith
- Based on: Winter in the Blood by James Welch
- Produced by: Sherman Alexie
- Starring: Chaske Spencer; Dana Wheeler Nicholson; Gary Farmer; David Cale; Julia Jones; David Morse
- Distributed by: Kino Lorber
- Release dates: June 14, 2013 (Los Angeles Film Festival); August 20, 2014 (United States)
- Country: United States
- Language: English

Winter in the Blood is a 2013 American film written and directed by brothers Alex Smith and Andrew J. Smith and produced by Native American author Sherman Alexie. The film was based on the debut novel Winter in the Blood (1974) by noted author James Welch, who was a leader of the Native American renaissance in literature.

== Plot ==
The film is set in Montana. In what has been called "a tale of simple, raw struggle and survival among a small-town Native American community", Virgil First Raise, a Native American, returns home after waking drunk in a ditch to find that his wife, Agnes, has left him. He sets out on an odyssey to find her.

== Cast ==
- Chaske Spencer as Virgil First Raise
- David Morse as Airplane man
- Gary Farmer as Lame Bull
- Julia Jones as Agnes First Raise
- Dana Wheeler-Nicholson as Malvina
- Lily Gladstone as Marlene
- Saginaw Grant as Yellow Calf
- Michael Spears as Raymond Long Knife
- David Cale as Bad Suit
- Yancy Hawley as Mose

== Reception ==
Mark Olsen of the Los Angeles Times said the film is concerned with memory and regret and it "feels boldly unburdened by many of the rules of structure and conventional storytelling." It has moments that are "unexpectedly arresting and little jabs of poetic meaning or hard-earned truths reel a viewer back in."

Jeannette Catsoulis of The New York Times said the film had compassion for the "wounds of childhood" and the "trap of ethnicity." She praised the work of the cinematographer Paula Huidobro, noting that she captured the expanse of the Montana plains and big sky while having "cross-fades [that] parallel the ebb and flow of Virgil’s memories and hallucinations."

The film was an Official Selection at the 2013 Los Angeles, Austin, and American Indian film festivals.
