= Shouting Secrets =

2011 film by Korinna Sehringer

- Film poster
- Directed by: Korinna Sehringer
- Written by: Mickey Blaine; Tvli Jacob; Steven Judd
- Produced by: Josef Ueli Bollag; Korinna Sehringer
- Starring: Chaske Spencer; Q'orianka Kilcher; Tyler Christopher; Tonantzin Carmelo; Gil Birmingham
- Cinematography: Markus Hürsch; Joseph White
- Release date: 10 November 2011
- Running time: 88 minutes
- Country: United States
- Language: English

Shouting Secrets is a 2011 independent film directed by Korinna Sehringer. It premiered at Hollis Cinemas 4 in downtown Globe, Arizona, on September 13, 2011.

The film has been nominated for and won numerous awards, including Best Feature Film at the Rhode Island International Film Festival.

== Plot ==
The film stars Chaske Spencer as Wesley, a young successful Apache novelist who left his family back in Arizona on the San Carlos Indian Reservation nine years earlier. His bestselling novel alienates him from most of his family, including his father, Cal (played by Gil Birmingham), his brother, Tuska (played by Tyler Christopher), and his sister, Pinti (played by Q'orianka Kilcher), because of the autobiographical content. However, he remains close to his mother, June (played by Tantoo Cardinal). When his mother suffers a stroke, Wesley finally returns to the reservation and must resolve his differences with his remaining family.

== Cast ==
- Chaske Spencer as Wesley
- Q'orianka Kilcher as Pinti
- Tyler Christopher as Tushka
- Gil Birmingham as Cal
- Tantoo Cardinal as June
- Tonantzin Carmelo as Caitlyn
- Sheri Foster as Elaine
- Molly Cookson as Annie
- Connor Fox as Brody
- Ted King as Dr. James Matthews

== Production ==
Shouting Secrets was written by Mickey Blaine, Tvli Jacob and Steven Judd.
