= Hank Williams First Nation =

- Directed by: Aaron James Sorensen
- Written by: Aaron James Sorensen
- Produced by: Aaron James Sorensen
- Starring: Gordon Tootoosis; Jimmy Herman; Stacy Da Silva; Colin VanLoon
- Cinematography: C. Kim Miles
- Edited by: Aaron James Sorensen
- Distributed by: Maple Pictures
- Release date: 2004
- Running time: 92 minutes
- Country: Canada
- Language: English

Hank Williams First Nation is a 2004 film directed by Aaron James Sorensen. It is Sorensen's first feature film.

The film stars Gordon Tootoosis, Jimmy Herman, Stacy Da Silva, and Colin VanLoon.

== Plot ==
The film follows the story of a seventy-five-year-old Cree man named Martin Fox who has been reading too many tabloids, and begins to believe that Elvis Presley and Princess Diana are still alive after their alleged deaths. From this he begins to wonder if his hero Hank Williams is not still alive as well. Before Fox's death, and joined by his younger brother and teenage nephew, he commits to making a Greyhound bus trip to Nashville, Tennessee to find out more about the country music legend and if he is truly deceased or still living.

== Production ==
The film was shot on the Woodland Cree First Nation in Northern Alberta.

== Reception ==
A presentation on the Canadian Film Database finds that "Many films like this seem to be excuses for a soundtrack CD but not in this case. This is solid story telling. And the music is great, including tracks by Joe Ely, Billy Joe Shaver, Old Reliable, Dave McCann, The Swiftys, Tim Hus and, of course, Hank Williams Sr." A mixed review for The Globe and Mail finds the film meets its "modest expectations".
