= Aaron James Sorensen =

- Born: June 6, 1966; Peace River, Alberta, Canada
- Occupation(s): Director, producer, screenwriter, musician and actor
- Website: http://www.aaronjames.com

Aaron James Sorensen (born June 6, 1966) is a Canadian musician, writer, producer, and director living in Calgary, Alberta. He has made several films and a mini-series.

== Early life ==
Sorensen was born in Peace River, Alberta and attended the University of Alberta and the University of Calgary, where he studied acting.

== Career ==
Sorensen worked as a school teacher and economic-development officer at the Woodland Cree First Nation in Alberta.

He wrote, directed, produced and edited the 2005 feature film Hank Williams First Nation, which in 2006 was adapted into a mini-series of the same name for the Canadian TV channel APTN. He wrote, directed and produced the TV series.

Sorensen moved to Los Angeles, where he studied acting at the Beverly Hills Playhouse, and then to Austin, Texas, where he wrote, directed, produced and edited the 2011 indie comedy film Campus Radio.

In 2017 Sorensen finished post–production on the film, Get Naked!

== Discography ==
- Cranberry Wind (2007), released under the name Aaron James.

== Filmography ==
- Hank Williams First Nation (2005)
- Campus Radio (2011)
- 40 Below & Falling (2016)
- Get Naked! (2017)
- Guitar Lessons (2022)
