= Mateo Frazier =

American Writer, Director, Producer

- Born: June 15, 1977 (age 48)
- Occupations: Producer, Writer, Director, Artist, Musician,
- Years active: 1995–present

Mateo Frazier (born June 15, 1977) is an American writer, director, producer. He is best known for co-writing and directing the 2013 Lionsgate film Blaze You Out and producing the 2014 Sundance film Drunktown's Finest.

== Early life ==
Frazier was born in Oklahoma, where his parents were attending college. Soon after he returned to Colorado and New Mexico where he spent his childhood. He attended UNLV and received a Bachelor of Arts in Social Sciences 2002 and attended The New School for graduate studies earning a Master of Arts in Media Studies in 2010.

== Career ==
In 2012, he co-wrote/directed the award-winning feature thriller Blaze You Out starring Elizabeth Peña and Raoul Trujillo, released by Lionsgate in July 2013. Also in the summer of 2013, he produced Drunktown's Finest with producing partner Chad Burris, and Executive Producer Robert Redford, which premiered in the NEXT category at Sundance Film Festival in 2014 and has since won a number of awards, including HBO Outfest’s Grand Jury Award for U.S. Dramatic Feature Film and the HBO-sponsored Audience Award for First Feature. In the summer of 2014 he associate produced on the feature film Bare starring Dianna Agron, Paz de la Huerta and Gary Farmer, which premiered at Tribeca Film Festival in April 2015. In February, 2015 he produced his first television segment for the Award Winning European network Arte. Durch die Nacht mit … featuring George R.R. Martin and Sibel Kekilli.

== Filmography ==
Year	Film	Role	Producer	Other notes
2012	Blaze You Out	Co-Writer Director	Alicia J. Keyes	
2014	Drunktown's Finest	Producer	Sundance Premier: NEXT Category	
2015	Bare	Associate Producer	Tribeca Premier	

== Awards and nominations ==
Year	Award	Category	Film	Result
2012	Albuquerque Film & Music Experience	Best Feature Film	Blaze You Out	Won
