= Randy Redroad =

Randy Redroad is a film director, film editor, writer and songwriter. He is best known for his films The Doe Boy (2001) and Among Ravens (2014) and for co-writing two episodes of the Amazon series Outer Range.

== Early life and education ==
Redroad was born Randolph Kendall Snapp on Chanute Air Force Base in Rantoul, IL., where his father was temporarily stationed for flight training. His family returned to Reese Air Force Base in Lubbock, TX. two weeks after he was born. He moved to New York City in the mid-1980s, where he worked as a bike messenger and, later, a waiter, eventually becoming interested in filmmaking, because it was the one art form that contained all the others. Redroad dropped out of college after two years, and signed up for a ten-month filmmaking workshop for people of color at Third World Newsreel. Redroad is Indigenous on his mother's side and of Scottish descent on his father's.

== Film career ==
Redroad completed the films Cow Tipping: The Militant Indian Waiter (1991) and Haircuts Hurt (1992) because of his participation with Third World Newsreel. He was given film directing residency from Sundance Institute in 1994. In the same year, he received the Rockefeller Intercultural Media grant, and a New York State Council For The Arts grant. He used the money to make his award-winning short film "High Horse", about urban Indians living in New York City. His first feature film The Doe Boy (2001) was shown at the Sundance Film Festival. Doe Boy is based partly on Randy's own personal experience. The film's title comes from an incident when he accidentally shot a doe while hunting with a "buck only" license with his father.

Redroad is a founding member of the award-winning StyleHorse Collective, a group of indigenous artists who work with tribal organizations to create inspiring and educational film and video projects. StyleHorse Collective are the creators of the popular Powwow Sweat series and the award-winning music video "We Shall Remain".

== Awards ==
The Doe Boy received 14 awards, including the Perrier Bubbling Under-First Time Filmmaker award at the Taos Talking Pictures film festival. Redroad also received the Sundance NHK International Filmmaker award and was nominated for the IFP Gotham outstanding directorial debut. "The Infiltrators" won both the Audience and Innovator Awards at the 2019 Sundance Film Festival.

== Selected filmography ==
- Cow Tipping: The Militant Indian Waiter (1991)
- Haircuts Hurt (1992)
- High Horse (1994)
- The Doe Boy (2001)
- Moccasin Flats (2003)
- 133 Skyway (2006)
- Out Of The Blue (2007)
- Ibid (2008)
- First Circle (2010)
- Earth Meets Wind (2011)
- Beautiful Wave (2012)
- Among Ravens (2014)
- We Shall Remain (2014)
- Powwow Sweat (2015)
- Wind Walkers (2015)
- Everybody Has An Andy Dick Story (2016)
- Edge Of The World (2019)
- The Infiltrators (2019)
- Being Michelle (2022 )
- Outer Range (2024 )
- Love, Apptually (2026)
