= Drunktown's Finest =

- Film poster
- Directed by: Sydney Freeland
- Screenplay by: Sydney Freeland
- Produced by: Mateo Frazier; Chad Burris
- Starring: Jeremiah Bitsui; Carmen Moore; Morningstar Angeline; Kiowa Gordon; Shauna Baker; Elizabeth Frances
- Cinematography: Peter Holland
- Edited by: Harry Yoon
- Music by: Mark Orton; Joel Pickard
- Production company: Indion Entertainment Group Wildwood Enterprises, Inc
- Distributed by: Sundance Channel
- Release date: January 18, 2014 (Sundance)
- Running time: 93 minutes
- Country: United States
- Languages: English; Navajo

Drunktown's Finest is a 2014 American drama film directed by Sydney Freeland. The film had its world premiere at the Sundance Film Festival on January 18, 2014. The film later screened at the Sundance London Film Festival on April 25, 2014.

The film was acquired by Sundance Channel after its premiere at Sundance Film Festival and was scheduled to broadcast in 2014.

== Plot ==
Three young Navajo Native Americans - an adopted Native girl, a young father-to-be, and a trans woman who dreams of being a model - strive to escape the hardships of life on an Indian reservation. Nizhoni seeks out her past, well after being adopted by a white Christian family, Felixia, a trans woman, pursues a spot in the "women of the tribe" calendar, and Sickboy is headed to basic training so he can take care of his soon-to-be-born child.

== Cast ==
- Jeremiah Bitsui as Luther SickBoy Maryboy
- Carmen Moore as Felixia
- Morningstar Angeline as Nizhoni Smiles
- Kiowa Gordon as Julius
- Shauna Baker as Karah
- Elizabeth Frances as Angela Maryboy

== Reception ==
Drunktown's Finest received positive reviews from critics. Geoff Berkshire of Variety wrote that "Freeland takes her time bringing her characters together, allowing the audience an opportunity to marinate in the unique experiences of each individual first. The slow-burn approach is smartly executed, and the intersecting plotlines veer toward schematic only during Sick Boy and Felixia’s chance encounter at a grocery store, which leads to an eventful night out." John DeFore in his review for The Hollywood Reporter praised the film by saying that "Native American themes get a fresh look in three-handed drama." Gary Green of HeyUGuys gave the film three stars, calling it "A low-budget picture with bigger things on its mind."
