= Alex Rice =

First Nations actress

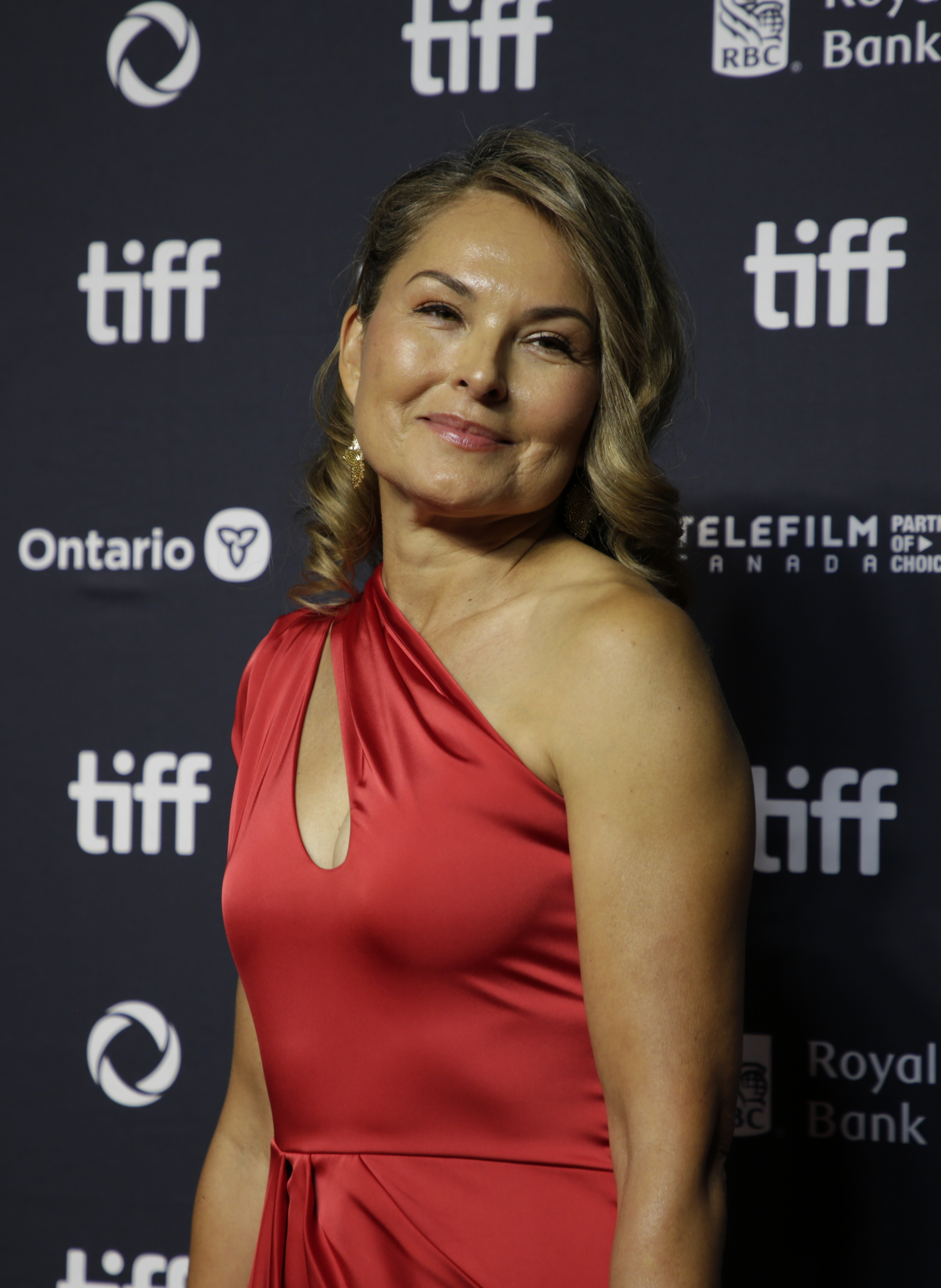
- Rice in 2025
- Born: Kahnawake, Quebec, Canada
- Education: Dawson College; Concordia University
- Years active: 2000–present

Alexandrea Kawisenhawe Rice is a First Nations (Mohawk) actress. Rice is known for her performances in The Twilight Saga (2008–2012) and in a series of PBS films adapted from the mystery novels of Tony Hillerman.

== Early life ==
Rice was born into a Kanien'kehaka (Mohawk) family on the Kahnawake reserve in Quebec. Through her father she is a member of the Rice family of Kahnawake, having descended from Edmund Rice, an early immigrant to Massachusetts Bay Colony. Two Rice boys were taken captive as children in 1704 from Massachusetts, and taken to Kahnawake, Quebec where they were adopted by Mohawk families and became assimilated. Alex is descended from Edmund Rice's great grandson, Silas, who took the name of Tookanowras, but he was also baptized as Catholic and known as Jacques Thanhohorens.

Born on the Kahnawake Mohawk reserve in Quebec, Canada, Rice spent the majority of her childhood with her family in Brooklyn, New York. Her father was among a community of Mohawk ironworkers, who settled in what is now Boerum Hill. The men worked on skyscrapers and bridges, and the women made community. The Mohawk called their neighborhood "Little Caughnawaga", after their homeland.

There Rice attended local schools and trained to become a professional dancer at local dance studios; she developed a passion for acting when she landed a part in an educational video produced at her grammar school. She attended Our Lady of Perpetual Help High School in Brooklyn. In 1990, after her father died and she graduated from high school, Alex and her mother Melody Rice moved back to Kanawake. She attended Dawson College and Concordia University in Montreal, where she majored in library science.

== Career ==
Rice first traveled to California in 1996 to attend a modeling convention and landed her first entertainment job working behind the scenes at the Judge Judy show. Her first feature film was the independent The Doe Boy (2001), which garnered several international film festival awards. She is perhaps best known for her recurring role as Janet Pete in the films Skinwalkers (2002), Coyote Waits (2003), and A Thief of Time (2004), based on the Tony Hillerman novels by the same names. She has appeared in other films including Lewis & Clark: Great Journey West, On the Corner, A Thousand Roads, the IMAX release of Sacagawea, Johnny Tootall, and The New World. She has also acted in various television series, including Spin City, CSI, Strong Medicine, and The Sopranos.

Rice played Sue Clearwater in the third installment of The Twilight Saga: Eclipse (released in 2010), the fourth installment The Twilight Saga: Breaking Dawn – Part 1 (released in 2011), and the fifth installment The Twilight Saga: Breaking Dawn – Part 2 (released in 2012).

== Filmography ==
=== Film ===
Year	Title	Role	Notes
2000	Chasing Indigo	Naomi	
2001	The Doe Boy	Bird	
2001	The War Bride	Ginnie Lee	
2003	On the Corner	Angel	
2005	The New World	Patowomeck's Wife	
2010	The Twilight Saga: Eclipse	Sue Clearwater	
2011	The Twilight Saga: Breaking Dawn – Part 1	Sue Clearwater	
2012	The Twilight Saga: Breaking Dawn – Part 2	Sue Clearwater	
2019	Rustic Oracle	Karen	
2021	Run Woman Run	Loretta	
2025	Meadowlarks		
TBA	Spirit Water	Morning Lawson	

=== Television ===
Year	Title	Role	Notes
2000	Spin City	Native American Representative	Season 5 Episode 6: "Balloons over Broadway"
2000	CSI: Crime Scene Investigation	Angie	Season 1 Episode 10: "Sex, Lies and Larvae"
2002	Strong Medicine	Teri Lavadour	Season 2 Episode 17: "Precautions"
2002	The Sopranos	Maggie Donner	Season 4 Episode 3: "Christopher"
2002	Skinwalkers	Janet Pete	Television film
2002	Skinwalkers: The Navajo Mysteries	Janet Pete	(1) Season 1 Episode 1: "Skinwalkers" (2) Season 1 Episode 2: "Coyote waits" (3) Season 1 Episode 3: "A Thief of Time"
2003	Dreamkeeper	She Crosses The Water	Television film
2003	Coyote Waits	Janet Pete	Television film
2004	A Thief of Time	Janet Pete	Television film
2004	Wonderfalls	Deanna Littlefoot	Season 1 Episode 12: "Totem Mole"
2005	Johnny Tootall	Serena	Television film
2006	Indian Summer: The Oka Crisis	Ellen Gabriel	Episodes 1, 2, 3, 4

== Awards ==
- 2003, Best Actress in the Motion Pictures Awards presented by the American Indian Film Institute, for her reprisal of Janet Pete in Coyote Waits.
- 2005, the First American Award for her work in A Thief In Time, presented by the First Americans in the Arts Committee.
