= Chaske Spencer =

American actor

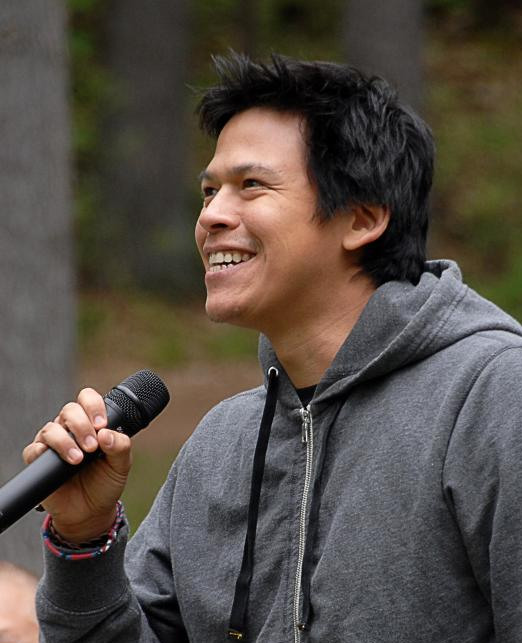
- Spencer in 2011
- Born: Oklahoma, U.S.
- Occupation: Actor
- Years active: 2002–present

Chaske Spencer (Lakota Sioux) is an American actor. He gained prominence through his role as Sam Uley in the Twilight films (2009–2012). For his performance in the BBC and Amazon Prime series The English (2022), he was nominated for a British Academy Television Award.

Spencer's films include Shouting Secrets (2011), Winter in the Blood (2013), Desert Cathedral (2014), Woman Walks Ahead (2017), and Wild Indian (2021). He had recurring roles in the Cinemax series Banshee (2014–2016), the Amazon Prime series Sneaky Pete (2017–2018), and the NBC crime drama Blindspot (2019–2020).

== Early life and education ==
Spencer was born in Oklahoma and grew up in Montana, as well as Kooskia, Lapwai, and Lewiston, Idaho. He has two younger sisters. His heritage includes Lakota, Nez Perce, Cherokee, Muscogee, French, and Dutch. He is Lakota Sioux, enrolled with the Fort Peck Assiniboine and Sioux Tribes of Montana through his mother.

Spencer graduated in 1994 from Clearwater Valley High School, in Kooskia, Idaho, where he went by the name James Spencer. As a young teen, he started acting in productions at the Lewiston Civic Theater. Spencer attended college at Lewis–Clark State College for a year, and considered a career in photography. He eventually dropped out of Lewis–Clark State College to pursue his acting career.

== Career ==
Spencer did odd jobs while taking acting lessons from coaches David Gideon and Ed Kovens. In 2002, he made his feature film debut as a young version of Eric Schweig's lead character in Skins. This was followed by further film roles in Dreamkeeper and Into the West.

In 2009, Spencer played werewolf Sam Uley in the Twilight sequel New Moon, based on Stephenie Meyer's novel of the same name. He reprised his role in Eclipse, Breaking Dawn – Part 1, and Breaking Dawn – Part 2. Spencer won two Best Actor accolades at the American Indian Film Festival for his performances in the 2011 film Shouting Secrets and the 2013 film Winter in the Blood. He also had a role in the 2014 film Desert Cathedral.

After playing Deputy Billy Raven in the 2014 spinoff web series Banshees Origins, Spencer reprised his role in the third season of the main Cinemax series Banshee the following year. In 2017, Spencer starred in the film Woman Walks Ahead, appeared in the film Walking Out, and had a recurring role as Chayton Dockery in the Amazon Prime series Sneaky Pete. He went on to have another recurring role as Dominic Masters in the fourth and fifth seasons of the NBC crime drama Blindspot.

Spencer starred in the 2021 thriller film Wild Indian, for which he was nominated for an Independent Spirit Award. The following year, he starred opposite Emily Blunt in the Western miniseries The English, produced for Amazon Prime Video and BBC One. For his performance, Spencer was nominated for the British Academy Television Award for Best Actor.

== Personal life ==
During his teens, Spencer had struggles with substance abuse and alcoholism. He continued to drink heavily during his college years. He later developed an addiction to cocaine and heroin, and checked into rehab. While in rehab, Spencer stopped taking drugs. He nearly gave up on acting before his agent called him to audition for New Moon, the sequel to Twilight.

== Filmography ==
=== Film ===
Year	Title	Role	Notes
2002	Skins	Teen Rudy	
2003	Dreamkeeper	Eagle Boy	
2009	The Twilight Saga: New Moon	Sam Uley	
2010	The Twilight Saga: Eclipse	Sam Uley	
2011	Shouting Secrets	Wesley	
2011	The Twilight Saga: Breaking Dawn – Part 1	Sam Uley	
2012	The Twilight Saga: Breaking Dawn – Part 2	Sam Uley	
2013	Winter in the Blood	Virgil First Raise	
2014	The Hero Pose	Joe	Short film
2014	Desert Cathedral	Duran Palouse	
2014	The Jingle Dress	John Red Elk	
2015	Addiction: A 60's Love Story	Rick Barone	
2017	Woman Walks Ahead	Chaska	
2021	Wild Indian	Teddo	
TBA	Indian Summer	Wez McKendrick	
TBA	Wind River: The Next Chapter		Post-production

=== Television ===
Year	Title	Role	Notes
2005	Into the West	Voices That Carry	Episodes: "Ghost Dance"; Miniseries
2012	The Frontier	Eli	Television film
2014	Banshee Origins	Deputy Billy Raven	Web miniseries
2015–2016	Banshee	Deputy Billy Raven	Recurring (season 3), guest (season 4)
2017	Longmire	Mr. Dawson	Episode: “No Greater Character Endorsement”
2017–2018	Sneaky Pete	Chayton Dockery	8 episodes
2019–2020	Blindspot	Dominic Masters	9 episodes
2019	The Society	Mr. Pfeiffer	Episode: "What Happened"
2019	Jessica Jones	Jace Montero	2 episodes
2022	The English	Sgt. Eli Whipp/Wounded Wolf	6 episodes
2024	Echo	Henry "Black Crow" Lopez	5 episodes
2024	Teacup	Ruben Shanley	
2026	Bass X Machina	Lighthorse (voice)	Main role
2026	Dark Winds	Sonny Bear Heart	3 episodes

== Awards and nominations ==
Year	Award	Category	Work	Result	Ref.
2011	American Indian Film Festival	Best Actor	Shouting Secrets	Won	
2013	American Indian Film Festival	Best Actor	Winter in the Blood	Won	
2014	SOFIE Awards	Best Actor in a Short Film	Hero Pose	Won	
2015	New York VisionFest	Desert Cathedral	Breakthrough Performance Award	Won	
2022	Independent Spirit Awards	Best Supporting Male	Wild Indian	Nominated	
2023	Royal Television Society Programme Awards	Actor – Male	The English	Nominated	
2023	British Academy Television Awards	Best Actor	The English	Nominated	
