= List of Boxcar Children novels =

Key
^	the book was completed and announced but never published
*	the book was not finished

== The Boxcar Children novels ==
The first nineteen books in the series were written by Gertrude Chandler Warner, the series's original author. Subsequent books were written by others after her death in 1979.

=== Written by Gertrude Chandler Warner ===
Number	Title	Published
1	The Boxcar Children	1924 as Box-Car Children; reissued 1943
2	Surprise Island	1949
3	The Yellow House Mystery	1953
4	Mystery Ranch	1958
5	Mike's Mystery	1960
6	Blue Bay Mystery	1961
7	The Woodshed Mystery	1962
8	The Lighthouse Mystery	1963
9	Mountain Top Mystery	1964
10	Schoolhouse Mystery	1965
11	Caboose Mystery	1966
12	Houseboat Mystery	1967
13	Snowbound Mystery	1968
14	Tree House Mystery	1969
15	Bicycle Mystery	1970
16	Mystery in the Sand	1971
17	Mystery Behind the Wall	1973
18	Bus Station Mystery	1974
19	Benny Uncovers a Mystery	1976

Number	Title	Published
20	The Haunted Cabin Mystery	1991
21	The Deserted Library Mystery	1991
22	The Animal Shelter Mystery	1991
23	The Old Motel Mystery	1991
24	The Mystery of the Hidden Painting	1992
25	The Amusement Park Mystery	1992
26	The Mystery of the Mixed Up Zoo	1992
27	The Camp Out Mystery	1992
28	The Mystery Girl	1992
29	The Mystery Cruise	1992
30	The Disappearing Friend Mystery	1992
31	The Mystery of the Singing Ghost	1992
32	The Mystery in the Snow	1993
33	The Pizza Mystery	1993
34	The Mystery Horse	1993
35	The Mystery at the Dog Show	1993
36	The Castle Mystery	1993
37	The Mystery of the Lost Village	1993
38	The Mystery of the Purple Pool	1994
39	The Ghost Ship Mystery	1994
40	The Canoe Trip Mystery	1994
41	The Mystery of the Hidden Beach	1994
42	The Mystery of the Missing Cat	1994
43	The Mystery on Stage	1994
44	The Dinosaur Mystery	1995
45	The Mystery of the Stolen Music	1995
46	The Chocolate Sundae Mystery	1995
47	The Mystery of the Hot Air Balloon	1995
48	The Mystery Bookstore	1995
49	The Mystery of the Stolen Boxcar	1995
50	The Mystery in the Cave	1996
51	The Mystery on the Train	1996
52	The Mystery of the Lost Mine	1996
53	The Guide Dog Mystery	1996
54	The Hurricane Mystery	1996
55	The Mystery of the Secret Message	1996
56	The Firehouse Mystery	1997
57	The Mystery in San Francisco	1997
58	The Mystery at the Alamo	1997
59	The Outer Space Mystery	1997
60	The Soccer Mystery	1997
61	The Growling Bear Mystery	1997
62	The Mystery of the Lake Monster	1998
63	The Mystery at Peacock Hall	1998
64	The Black Pearl Mystery	1998
65	The Cereal Box Mystery	1998
66	The Panther Mystery	1998
67	The Mystery of the Stolen Sword	1998
68	The Basketball Mystery	1999
69	The Movie Star Mystery	1999
70	The Mystery of the Pirate's Map	1999
71	The Ghost Town Mystery	1999
72	The Mystery in the Mall	1999
73	The Gymnastics Mystery	1999
74	The Poison Frog Mystery	2000
75	The Mystery of the Empty Safe	2000
76	The Great Bicycle Race Mystery	2000
77	The Mystery of the Wild Ponies	2000
78	The Mystery in the Computer Game	2000
79	The Mystery at the Crooked House	2000
80	The Hockey Mystery	2001
81	The Mystery of the Midnight Dog	2001
82	The Summer Camp Mystery	2001
83	The Copycat Mystery	2001
84	The Haunted Clock Tower Mystery	2001
85	The Disappearing Staircase Mystery	2001
86	The Mystery on Blizzard Mountain	2002
87	The Mystery of the Spider's Clue	2002
88	The Mystery of the Mummy's Curse	2002
89	The Mystery of the Star Ruby	2002
90	The Stuffed Bear Mystery	2002
91	The Mystery at Skeleton Point	2002
92	The Tattletale Mystery	2003
93	The Comic Book Mystery	2003
94	The Ice Cream Mystery	2003
95	The Midnight Mystery	2003
96	The Mystery in the Fortune Cookie	2003
97	The Radio Mystery	2003
98	The Mystery of the Runaway Ghost	2004
99	The Finders Keepers Mystery	2004
100	The Mystery of the Haunted Boxcar	2004
101	The Clue in the Corn Maze	2004
102	The Ghost of the Chattering Bones	2005
103	The Sword of the Silver Knight	2005
104	The Game Store Mystery	2005
105	The Mystery of the Orphan Train	2005
106	The Vanishing Passenger	2006
107	The Giant Yo Yo Mystery	2006
108	The Creature in Ogopogo Lake	2006
109	The Rock and Roll Mystery	2006
110	The Secret of the Mask	2007
111	The Seattle Puzzle	2007
112	The Ghost in the First Row	2007
113	The Box that Watch Found	2007
114	A Horse Named Dragon	2008
115	The Great Detective Race	2008
116	The Ghost at the Drive-In Movie	2008
117	The Mystery of the Traveling Tomatoes	2008
118	The Spy Game	2009
119	The Dog-Gone Mystery	2009
120	The Vampire Mystery	2009
121	Superstar Watch	2009
122	The Spy in the Bleachers	2010
123	The Amazing Mystery Show	2010
124	The Pumpkin Head Mystery	2010
125	The Cupcake Caper	2010
126	The Clue in the Recycling Bin	2011
127	Monkey Trouble	2011
128	The Zombie Project	2011
129	The Great Turkey Heist	2011
130	The Garden Thief	2012
131	The Boardwalk Mystery	2013
132	The Mystery of the Fallen Treasure	2013
133	The Return of the Graveyard Ghost	2013
134	The Mystery of the Stolen Snowboard	2014
135	The Mystery of the Wild West Bandit	2014
136	The Mystery of the Soccer Snitch	2014
137	The Mystery of the Grinning Gargoyle	2014
138	The Mystery of the Missing Pop Idol	2015
139	The Mystery of the Stolen Dinosaur Bones	2015
140	The Mystery at the Calgary Stampede	2015
141	The Sleepy Hollow Mystery	2015
142	The Legend of the Irish Castle	2016
143	The Celebrity Cat Caper	2016
144	Hidden in the Haunted School	2016
145	The Election Day Dilemma	2016
146	The Doughnut Whodunit	2018
147	The Robot Ransom	2018
148	The Legend of the Howling Werewolf	2018
149	The Day of the Dead Mystery	2018
150	The Hundred-Year Mystery	2019
151	The Sea Turtle Mystery	2019
152	Secret on the Thirteenth Floor	2019
153	The Power Down Mystery	2019
154	Mystery at Camp Survival	2020
155	The Mystery of the Forgotten Family	2020
156	The Skeleton Key Mystery	2020
157	Science Fair Sabotage	2020
158	The Great Greenfield Bake-Off	2021
159	The Beekeeper Mystery	2021
160	The Mystery in the Magic Shop	2022
161	The Raptor Rescue	2022
162^	The Code-Breaking Mystery	2023
163^	X Marks the Spot	2023
164^	Secret of Superstition Mountain	2023
165	The Supermarket Mystery -coming soon	TBD
166	Sports Day Sabatoge -coming soon	TBD

Number	Title The Boxcar Children Great Adventure	Published
1	Journey on a Runaway Train	2017
2	The Clue in the Papyrus Scroll	2017
3	The Detour of the Elephants	2017
4	The Shackleton Sabotage	2017
5	The Khipu and the Final Key	2017

== The Boxcar Children Interactive Mysteries ==
Number	Title	Published
1	Midnight at the Haunted Hotel	2018
2	The Great Spy Showdown	2019
3	Trouble on the Wild West Express	2020
4	Race through White-Water Canyon	2021

== The Boxcar Children Creatures of Legend ==
Number	Title	Published
1	The Secret of Bigfoot Valley	2021
2	Mystery of the Hidden Elves	2021
3	Mermaids of the Deep Blue Sea	2021
4	Myth of the Rain Forest Monster	2021

== The Boxcar Children Endangered Animals ==
Number	Title	Published
1	The Big Spill Rescue	2022
2	Mystery of the Spotted Leopard	2022
3	Mystery of the Vanishing Forest	2022
4	The Great Reef Rebuild	2022

== The Boxcar Children Summer of Adventure ==
(*) Indicates that the books were later integrated into the main series as books 163 and 164 respectively (legend of the Hidden Treasure was also re-titled as "X Marks The Spot" for this purpose).

Number	Title	Published
1	Legend of the Hidden Treasure*^	2023
2	Secret of Superstition Mountain*^	2023

== The Boxcar Children Specials Series ==
Number	Title	Published
1	The Mystery on the Ice	1993
2	The Mystery in Washington, DC	1994
3	The Mystery at Snowflake Inn	1994
4	The Mystery at the Ballpark	1994
5	The Pilgrim Village Mystery	1995
6	The Mystery at the Fair	1996
7	The Pet Shop Mystery	1996
8	The Niagara Falls Mystery	1997
9	The Mystery in the Old Attic	1997
10	The Windy City Mystery	1998
11	The Mystery of the Queen's Jewels	1998
12	The Mystery of the Black Raven	1999
13	The Mystery in New York	1999
14	The Home Run Mystery	2000
15	The Honeybee Mystery	2000
16	The Mystery of the Screech Owl	2001
17	The Mystery of the Tiger's Eye	2001
18	The Candy Factory Mystery	2002
19	The Mystery of Alligator Swamp	2002
20	The Great Shark Mystery	2003
21	The Black Widow Spider Mystery	2003

== Boxcar Children Beginning ==
Title	Published
The Boxcar Children Beginning: The Aldens of Fair Meadow Farm	2012

== Guides to Adventure ==
Title	Published
The Boxcar Children Guide to Adventure	2014

== The Jessie Files ==
Number	Title	Published
1	The Friendship Feature	2022
2	Talk of the Town	2022
3	A Dramatic Disappearance	2022
4	The Campsite Cold Case	2022

== The Adventures of Benny and Watch ==
Number	Title	Published
1	Meet the Boxcar Children	1999
2	A Present for Grandfather	1998
3	Benny's New Friend	1998
4	Benny Goes Into Business	1999
5	The Magic Show Mystery	1997
6	Watch Runs Away	1999
7	The Secret Under the Tree (Rise and Shine)	2010
8	Benny's Saturday Surprise	2001
9	Sam Makes Trouble	2002
10	Watch, the Superdog!	2002
11	Keys and Clues for Benny	2004
12	Benny's Boxcar Sleepover	2004
