= Gertrude Chandler Warner =

American author (1890–1979)

- Born: April 16, 1890; Putnam, Connecticut, US
- Died: August 30, 1979 (aged 89); Killingly, Connecticut, US
- Known for: The Boxcar Children book series

Gertrude Chandler Warner (April 16, 1890 – August 30, 1979) was an American author, mainly of children's stories. She was most famous for writing the original book of The Boxcar Children and for the next 18 books in the series.

== Biography ==
Warner was born in Putnam, Connecticut, on April 16, 1890, to Edgar Morris Warner and Jane Elizabeth Carpenter Warner. Her family included an older sister, Frances, and a younger brother, John. Her middle name came from her mother's ancestors, the Chandlers, who had settled in nearby Woodstock, Connecticut, in 1686. Warner's father, Edgar, graduated from Harvard Law School in 1872 and practiced law in Putnam. The Warners' house on Main Street was located across from the railroad station.

At age five, Warner dreamed of being an author, and she began writing in 10-cent blank books as soon as she was able to hold a pencil. Warner's first book was an imitation of Florence Kate Upton's Golliwog stories and was titled Golliwog at the Zoo; it "consisted of verses illustrated with watercolors of the two Dutch clocks and the Goliwog." Warner presented this book to her grandfather, and every Christmas afterwards, she would give him a hand-made book as a present.

While growing up, Warner loved to read, and her favorite book was Alice's Adventures in Wonderland. Being in a musical family, Warner was predisposed to play an instrument; in her case, Warner chose the cello, and her father bought her a cello kit at a young age. However, because of her frequent illnesses, Warner never finished high school. After leaving, she studied with a tutor and finished her secondary education. While teaching Sunday School in 1918, Warner was called to teach the first grade, mainly because male teachers were being called to serve in World War I. Warner continued teaching as a grade school teacher in Putnam from 1918 to 1950. During this time, she also returned to school for education courses at Yale University's summer school.

Warner was a lover of nature. While growing up, she had butterfly and moth collections, pressed wildflowers, learned of all the birds in her backyard and other places, and kept a garden to see what butterflies were doing. Warner used these interests in teaching her grade school students and she also used nature themes in her books. For instance, in the second book of The Boxcar Children, Surprise Island, the Alden children make a nature museum from the flowers, shells, and seaweed they have collected and the shapes of birds they have observed. One of Warner's students recalled the wildflower and stone-gathering contests that Warner sponsored when she was a teacher.

As well as her books in The Boxcar Children series, Warner wrote many other books for children, including The World in a Barn (1927), Windows into Alaska (1928), The World on a Farm (1931) and Peter Piper, Missionary Parakeet (1967). With her sister, Frances Lester Warner, she cowrote "Life's Minor Collisions," a series of essays about humorous conflicts of temperament among friends and families. The sisters took the essays in turn, Frances writing the odd-numbered pieces and Gertrude the even.

Warner never married. She lived in her parents' home for almost 40 years, then moved to her grandmother's house. In 1962, Warner moved to a brown-shingled house, Jill C. Wheeler, Gertrude Chandler Warner, Abdo Publishing Co, and lived there with her companion, a retired nurse. In her later life, Warner became a volunteer for the American Red Cross, a Cancer Society and other charitable organizations to help kids and adults in need from suffering.

Warner died in Killingly, Connecticut, on August 30, 1979 aged 89. She is buried in Grove Street Cemetery, in Putnam.

== The Boxcar Children series ==
Warner once said that she did much of her writing while convalescing from illnesses or accidents, and that she conceived the idea of The Boxcar Children while sick at home. Of this, she said:

I had to stay at home from school because of an attack of bronchitis. Having written a series of eight books to order for a religious organization, I decided to write a book just to suit myself. What would I like to do? Well, I would like to live in a freight car, or a caboose. I would hang my wash out on the little back piazza and cook my stew on the little rusty stove found in the caboose.

This original version of The Boxcar Children was published by Rand McNally and Company in 1924. It included four color illustrations by Dorothy Lake Gregory. In 1942, Warner rewrote the book with a prescribed vocabulary of six hundred words and a text of about 15,000 words, so that it could be used as a children's school reader. This edition featured numerous black-and-white silhouette illustrations by L. Kate Deal. Warner continued writing other things, but did not continue with The Boxcar Children series until her retirement from teaching. The second book in the series, Surprise Island, was published in 1949.

Warner once acknowledged that The Boxcar Children was criticized for depicting children with little parental supervision; her critics thought that this would encourage child rebellion. Her response was, however, that the children liked it for that very reason. In her books, Warner "liked to stress the Aldens' independence and resourcefulness and their solid New England devotion to using up and making do".

Today, Albert Whitman & Company publishes the series of Warner's original 19 stories. Other authors have contributed to the series, adding approximately 150 books to The Boxcar Children series.

In 2020, Gertrude Chandler Warner's The Box-Car Children, the first book in the series, entered the public domain.

== Boxcar Children Museum ==
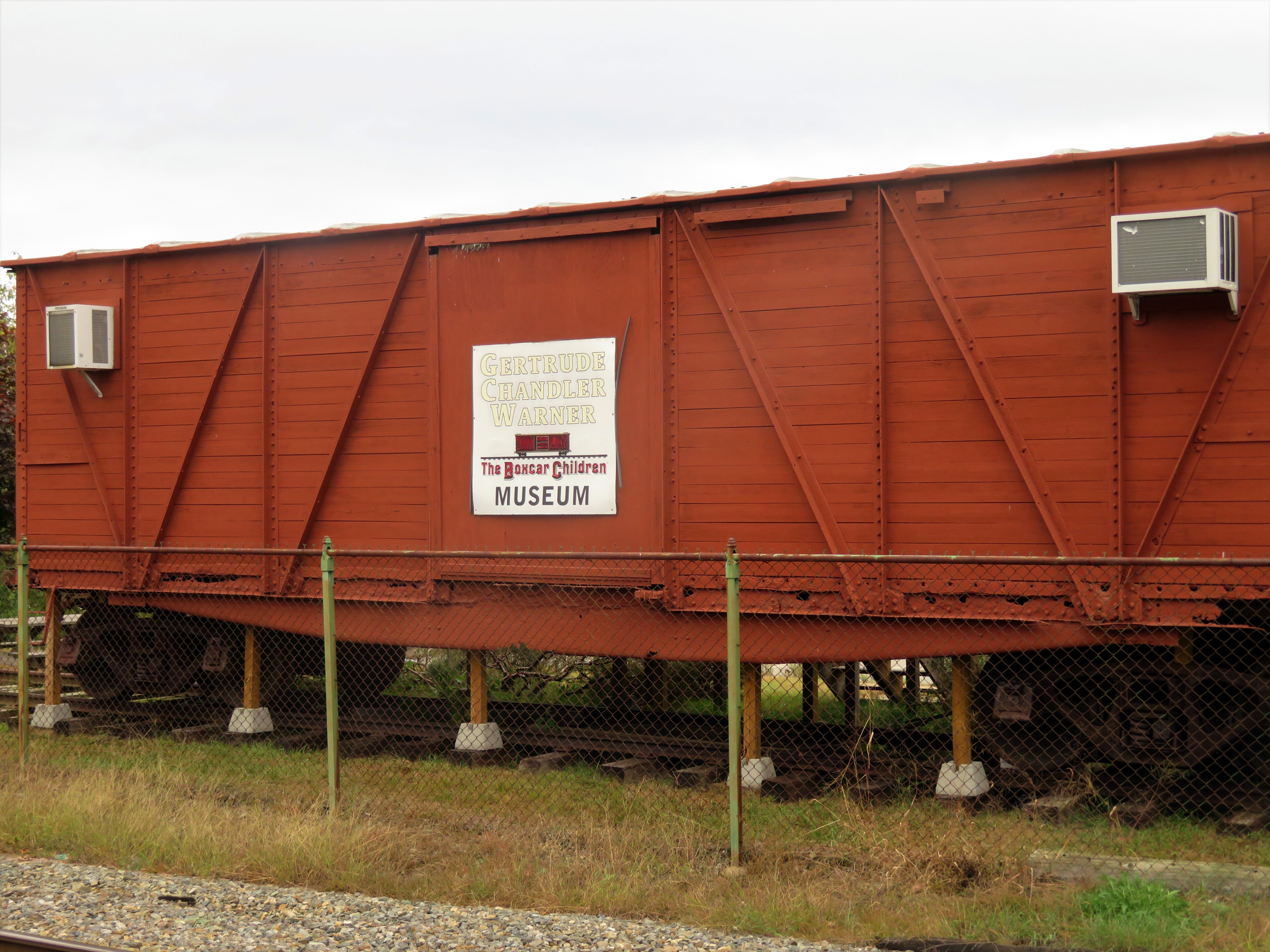
Boxcar at the museum in 2018

On July 3, 2004, the Gertrude Chandler Warner Boxcar Children Museum opened in Putnam, Connecticut. It is located across the street from Warner's childhood home and is housed in an authentic 1920s New Haven R.R. boxcar. The museum is dedicated to Warner's life and work, and includes original signed books, photos and artifacts from her life and career as a teacher in Putnam. Included is the desk at which a nine-year-old Warner wrote her first story titled Golliwog at the Zoo. There is also a re-creation of the living space created by the Aldens – the Boxcar Children themselves.

== See also ==
- List of Boxcar Children novels
