= Annabella Piugattuk =

Canadian Inuk actress (born 1982)

- Born: December 19, 1982 (age 43); Frobisher Bay, Northwest Territories, Canada
- Occupation: Actress
- Years active: 2003–present

Annabella Piugattuk (born December 19, 1982) is a Canadian Inuk actress, notable for her role in the 2003 film The Snow Walker.

== Early life ==
Annabella Piugattuk was born December 19, 1982, in Frobisher Bay, Northwest Territories (what is now Iqaluit, Nunavut), Canada. She was raised with her four brothers and younger sister in Igloolik, a village with a population of 1,286 in Nunavut. Throughout her childhood, Piugattuk spent time with her grandfather, listening to his stories of their ancestral past and developing a deep understanding of Inuit tradition. She became adept at hunting and wilderness survival techniques.

== Acting career ==
Annabella became interested in acting after her grade eight teacher involved her in a school play. At the age of 19, she read a story in the Nunatsiaq News about casting directors in town searching for actors for a new film, The Snow Walker. She was encouraged by her mother to audition.

At a community dance with friends, Piugattuk was approached by casting director Jared Valentine, who asked her to audition for the role of Kanaalaq. After attending local auditions, the diminutive teenager (she is 4'9") and six other semi-finalists were flown to Vancouver to do screen tests. A few weeks after returning home, she received word that she was offered the part.

In the film The Snow Walker, Piugattuk plays the character of Kanaalaq, a young Inuk woman who helps a Canadian bush pilot to survive the harsh conditions of the Northwest Territories following an airplane crash. Like the character she portrays, she can fish, hunt seal and walrus, and make clothing out of caribou hides. For her role in The Snow Walker, Piugattuk received a Genie nomination as best supporting actress in 2004. Her performance was commended by Susan Walker in the Toronto Star and by Liz Nicholls in the Edmonton Journal.

In 2005, she appeared in the TV miniseries Into the West in the role of Dancing Water.

== Filmography ==
- The Snow Walker (2003)
- Into the West (2005)

== Honors and awards ==
- 2004 Genie Awards Nomination for Best Performance by an Actress in a Supporting Role (for The Snow Walker)
- 2006 DVD Exclusive Awards Nomination for Best Actress (for The Snow Walker)

== See also ==
- Notable Aboriginal people of Canada
