= Tonantzin Carmelo =

American actress

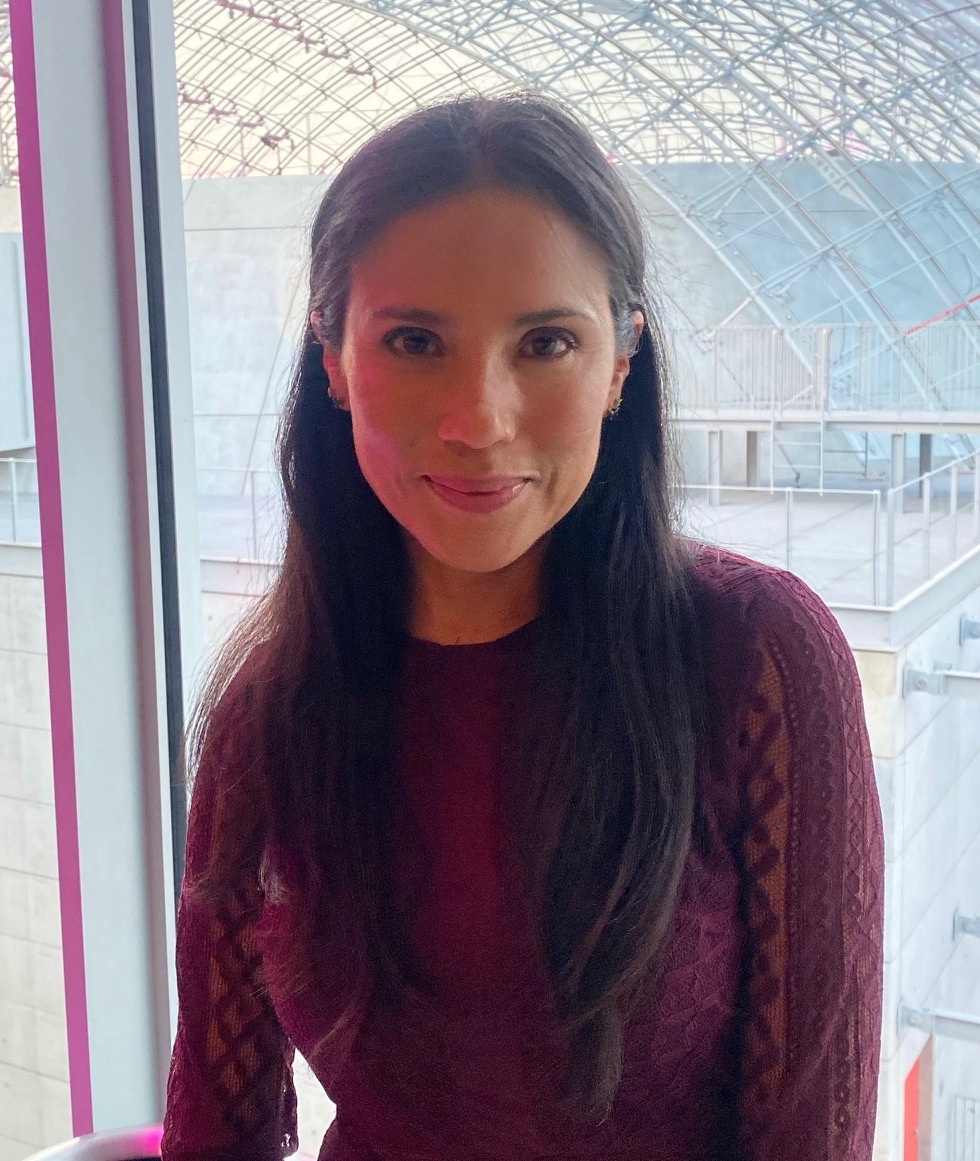
- Born: July 26, 1979 (age 47)
- Education: University of California, Irvine
- Occupation: Actress
- Years active: 1997–present
- Website: tcarmelo.com

Tonantzin Carmelo is an American actress. She is known for her acting roles in film, TV and stage productions including in the Steven Spielberg miniseries, Into the West, for which she received a Screen Actors Guild nomination for Outstanding Performance by a Female in a Television Movie or Miniseries.

In 2021, Carmelo filmed roles in Spain and Australia for the television series The English (BBC) and La Brea (NBC). In March 2024, she joined the cast of Dark Winds (AMC) as a recurring guest star. In July 2024, Carmelo began filming NCIS Origins (CBS) in Los Angeles playing the recurring character of Tish Kwa'la, the love of Mike Franks' life.

== Early life and education ==
Carmelo grew up in Orange County, southern California and is of Native American (Tongva and Kumeyaay) and Latina descent. As a youth, she participated in Native American dances and music, touring with cultural groups throughout North America. She also became a technically trained dancer and performed with the modern dance company Daystar.

Carmelo attended the University of California, Irvine, where she earned a bachelor's degree in Environmental Studies and a minor in Dance. While in college, she began acting in theater productions and independent films.

== Career ==
Carmelo began her professional acting career in an educational musical theater show produced by Carmen Zapata at the Bilingual Foundation of the Arts. The production toured the Los Angeles area.

In 2007, Carmelo played the leading role of Shayla Stonefeather in the thriller Imprint.

In addition, Carmelo is a choreographer. Her work was featured in the Amazon TV series, Undone, and in the opera, Sweetland. She has also performed as a singer with the band Trio del Alma and has recorded on three albums for Canyon Records.

In 2012, Carmelo testified for the United States Senate Committee on Indian Affairs on the images of Native Americans in Hollywood.

Carmelo has also appeared in several video games, including Dead Space, The Crew, Lego Marvel's Avengers, and Cyberpunk 2077. Her memorable motion-capture and voice performance portrayal of the villainous character Kendra Daniels for Dead Space led Maxim Magazine to add Kendra to their Hottest Video Game Babes of the Year list. Today, the character continues to attract legions of loyal fans.

She has had an ongoing relationship with Native Voices at the Autry Museum in Los Angeles, where she has performed on stage and has served on the advisory board.

She is a member of the Tongva Language Committee for Revitalization.

== Awards and nominations ==
On January 5, 2006, Carmelo was nominated for the Screen Actors Guild Award for Outstanding Performance by a Female Actor in a Television Movie or Miniseries for her performance as Thunder Heart Woman in Into the West.

Carmelo also won the American Indian Film Festival award for Best Actress and was nominated for the Best Actress award at the Hoboken International Film Festival for this role. She was also named "An Indie Darling to Crave" at the Sundance Film Festival 2015 for her role as Teresa, opposite John C. Reilly in the film Entertainment. Below is a list of her awards and nominations.

Awards
Year	Film	Award
2012	Shouting Secrets	FirstGlance Award for Best Ensemble Cast
2008	Imprint	Hoboken International Film Festival Award for Best Actress
2007	Imprint	American Indian Film Festival Award for Best Actress
2006	Into the West	Outstanding Actress Performance in a TV Movie/Special (Lead)
2006	Into the West	Western Heritage Award, Bronze Wrangler

Nominations
Year	Film	Nomination
2011	Shouting Secrets	Nominated - American Indian Film Festival Award for Best Actress
2006	Into the West	Nominated – Screen Actors Guild Award for Best Actress; Western Heritage Award shared with cast and crew
2006	Into the West	Nominated – Gold Derby TV Award, TV Movie/Mini Supporting Actress
2005	Into the West	Nominated – OFTA Television Award for Best Actress in a Motion Picture or Miniseries

== Filmography ==
Film and Television
Year	Title	Role	Notes
2026	Tombs	The Lone Woman	
2024-2026	NCIS: Origins	Tishmal Kwa’ la	TV series
2024	Ark: The Animated Series	Zitkala / John's Son (voice)	TV series
2022	The English	Touching Ground	TV series
2022–2024	Spirit Rangers	Buffalo / Orchids (voice)	TV series
2021–2024	La Brea	Paara	TV series; Recurring role (season 1); Main role (season 2); Guest role (season 3)
2020	El Camino de Xico	Carmen	
2020	A Soldier's Revenge	Alpana	
2019	Undone	Tonantzin	TV series
2019	The Chosen One	Dr. Lúcia Santiero (English voiceover)	TV series
2019	The Son	Nascha	TV series
2018	Z Nation	Kuruk	TV series
2018	Animal Kingdom	Anna	TV series
2018	White Fang		Film (voiceover)
2016	Teen Wolf	Skinwalker / Black Night	TV series
2015	Entertainment	Teresa	
2014	Child of Grace	Kaya	
2014	The Activist	Anna Ward	
2011	Periphery	Isabella	
2011	Shouting Secrets	Caitlyn	
2010	American Dad!	Sooleawa'uha (voice)	Episode: "There Will Be Bad Blood"
2010	Red Carpet Report	Herself	TV series short
2009	Shadowheart	Miakoda	Video
2009	Dark Blue	Gina	TV series
2009	American Experience	Awashunk	TV series documentary
2007	Unearthed	Nodin	
2007	CSI: Miami	Adrienne Veston	TV series
2007	Imprint	Shayla Stonefeather	
2005	Into the West	Thunder Heart Woman	TV mini series
2003	Dragnet	Erika Sanchez	TV series
2003	187 Shadow Lane	Christina	
2002	King Rikki	Anita	

=== Video games ===
Year	Title	Role	Note
2008	Dead Space	Kendra Daniels	
2014	The Crew	Roxanne	
2016	Lego Marvel's Avengers	Maya Lopez / Echo	
2020	Cyberpunk 2077	Joss Kutcher	
2022	As Dusk Falls	Joyce Walema	
