= White Noise (2005 film) =

- American theatrical release poster
- Directed by: Geoffrey Sax
- Written by: Niall Johnson
- Produced by: Paul Brooks
- Starring: Michael Keaton; Deborah Kara Unger; Chandra West; Ian McNeice
- Cinematography: Chris Seager
- Edited by: Nick Arthurs
- Music by: Claude Foisy
- Production companies: Gold Circle Films; White Noise UK Limited; Brightlight Pictures; Endgame Entertainment; CHUM Television; The Movie Network
- Distributed by: TVA Films (Canada); Entertainment Film Distributors (United Kingdom); Universal Pictures (United States)
- Release date: January 7, 2005
- Running time: 101 minutes
- Countries: Canada; United Kingdom; United States
- Language: English
- Budget: $10 million
- Box office: $91.2 million

White Noise is a 2005 supernatural horror film directed by Geoffrey Sax and starring Michael Keaton and Deborah Kara Unger. The title refers to electronic voice phenomena (EVP), where anomalous voice-like sounds, which some believe to be from the "other side" — interpreted as spirit voices, are found on electronic audio recordings.

== Plot ==
Jonathan Rivers is an architect, married to his wife Anna, a best-selling author. The couple have a young son from Jonathan's previous marriage, and Anna is newly pregnant. One evening, Anna fails to arrive home and becomes missing for five weeks without explanation.

Soon after Anna's disappearance, Jonathan is contacted by Raymond Price, whose son has died. Raymond explains he has received frequent communication from his son and other spirits via electronic voice phenomena (EVP), claiming to also have recorded voice messages from Anna and suggests she is dead. Jonathan is initially dismissive and angered, yet he later learns of his wife's tragic drowning. The news reports the incident as an accidental death.

Jonathan encounters numerous instances of what he interprets as Anna attempting to contact him. Desperate, he visits Raymond to inquire more on EVP. During this visit, Jonathan is befriended by Sarah Tate, a woman who has also come to Raymond for his EVP work because her fiancé has recently died.

Jonathan captures a recorded voice and believes it is indeed his wife's and becomes obsessed with trying to contact her himself. He soon encounters other voices — angry, aggressive, vulgar, and threatening.

Raymond is found inexplicably dead. Jonathan and Sarah begin to review Raymond's EVP logs. Jonathan seeks advice from a psychic and is warned that, while she takes measures to avoid hostile entities, EVP is an indiscriminate process that offers no such safeguards. She cautions Jonathan's pursuance of EVP, comparing it to the potential dangers of using a Ouija board to invoke spirits.

Jonathan begins to be followed by three demons attracted by his obsession with EVP. He finds some of the EVP messages he receives are from people who are not yet dead but may soon be. Jonathan hears EVP cries from a woman whom he rushes to find in a wrecked car with an infant child. He is able to save the child but not the woman. At that woman's funeral, which Jonathan and Sarah both attend, Jonathan approaches the husband and attempts to explain how he came to know of the accident, beginning to discuss EVP. The man thanks Jonathan for saving his son but then demands to be left alone.

Afterward, while working with his EVP devices, Jonathan sees images of another person, a recently missing woman named Mary Freeman. Sarah is later seriously injured by a fall from a high-rise balcony while possessed by the demons, an incident which was foreshadowed by Sarah's image being among those on the EVP devices.

Following signs he finds on EVP recordings, Jonathan locates the site where he believes the missing Mary Freeman is being kept. He contacts police to report his suspicion and insists they come to the location right away. Jonathan finds elaborate EVP deciphering electronic equipment on site. A construction workman from Jonathan's company, who has been doing his own EVP work, is found to be holding Mary captive. He is under the control of the three demons, doing their evil bidding, and as the demons preside over this conversation, the workman confesses he has been instructed to kill Mary, insinuating he did the same with Anna. As the three demons watch, Jonathan attempts to save Mary, but the demons intervene, torturing Jonathan by breaking his arms and legs and cause him to fall to his death. A police SWAT team arrives on scene and are able to save Mary by shooting the workman dead.

Leaving Jonathan's funeral, his ex-wife and son hear Jonathan's voice coming from the car radio through static interference saying, "I'm sorry, Mikey," to his son, who recognizes the voice and smiles. Sarah, in a wheelchair at Jonathan's graveside, is menaced by odd noises in the wind.

Just before film credits roll, the camera flashes to a screen where the image of Jonathan and his wife is visible in white noise static. A closing intertitle reads, "Of the many thousands of documented EVP messages, approximately 1 in 12 have been overtly threatening in nature..."

== Cast ==
- Michael Keaton as Jonathan Rivers
- Deborah Kara Unger as Sarah Tate, bookstore owner
- Chandra West as Anna Rivers, a writer
- Ian McNeice as Raymond Price
- Sarah Strange as Jane
- Keegan Connor Tracy as Mirabelle Keegan
- Miranda Frigon as Carol Black
- Benita Ha as TV Reporter
- Aaron Douglas as Frank Black
- Brad Sihvon as Minister
- Peter James Bryant as EVP - Man
- April Telek as John's Secretary
- Mike Dopud as Detective Smits

== Production ==
In May 2003, it was announced Michael Keaton was attached to star in the film with principal photography slated to begin in August of that year.

== Reception ==
On the review aggregator website Rotten Tomatoes, 7% of 148 critics' reviews are positive, with an average rating of 3.4/10. The website's consensus reads: "While there are some built-in scares, the movie is muddled and unsatisfying." Metacritic, which uses a weighted average, assigned the film a score of 30 out of 100, based on 32 critics, indicating "generally unfavorable" reviews. Audiences polled by CinemaScore gave the film an average grade of "C" on an A+ to F scale.

== Sequel ==
A sequel titled White Noise: The Light was released in January 2007.

== Legacy ==
White Noise's surprising box-office success for a movie released on the first weekend after New Year's Day, the start of the winter dump months and usually one of the worst weekends for new releases, led studios to reassess their releasing strategies for horror films. In 2013, Universal chairman Adam Fogelson said, "The first weekend in January used to be a non-starter for people; we had this little horror movie White Noise that did business, and that has become a place where movies [like] that tend to operate."

If a horror film as poorly received as White Noise could nevertheless make a significant amount of money in January, studios realized, a quality film in that genre could do even better. In 2008, an elaborate viral marketing campaign gave Paramount's found footage horror film Cloverfield a $40 million opening weekend, which remained the record for January until Ride Along in 2014. In 2012 Paramount beat White Noise's first-weekend success with The Devil Inside, which took in $35 million despite a strongly negative reaction from critics and audiences. "Ever since White Noise was a hit in 2005, that's what started it. If you look back at every first weekend, besides expanding titles, the only new release is usually one crappy horror movie," C. Robert Cargill of Ain't It Cool News told Hollywood.com in 2013.

Another surprise from the first film's legacy was the stand-alone sequel, "White Noise: The Light", released in 2007 and starring Nathan Fillion ("Firefly", "The Suicide Squad") and Katee Sackhoff ("Battlestar Galactica", "The Mandalorian"). The film holds a 75% "fresh" rating on the Rotten Tomatoes aggregate review site and was considered a superior film in many ways, with strong critical praise for the powerful performances of its two leads.

== See also ==
- List of ghost films
