= 12th Screen Actors Guild Awards =

- Awarded for: Outstanding motion picture and primetime television performances
- Date: January 29, 2006
- Location: Shrine Auditorium; Los Angeles, California
- Country: United States
- Presented by: Screen Actors Guild
- Website: www.sagawards.org

Television/radio coverage
- Network: TNT and TBS first time simultaneous broadcast

The 12th Annual Screen Actors Guild Awards ceremony, honoring the best in film and television acting achievement for the year 2005, took place on January 29, 2006, at the Los Angeles Shrine Exposition Center, in Los Angeles, California. It was the 10th consecutive year the ceremony was held at the center. The nominees were announced on January 5, 2006, and the event was televised live by both TNT and TBS. It was the first ever year TBS televised the ceremony, while it was the 9th consecutive year that TNT had aired it.

Among the contenders for the film awards Brokeback Mountain received the highest number of nominations with four. Capote and Crash received the second highest number with three each. No film however received more than one award. In the television categories the mini-series Empire Falls and the spin-off series Boston Legal led the nominees with four nominations each. Desperate Housewives was the only series which won more than one award, two in total.

The Screen Actors Guild Life Achievement Award was presented to the former child actress Shirley Temple Black.

== Winners and nominees ==
Winners are listed first and highlighted in boldface.

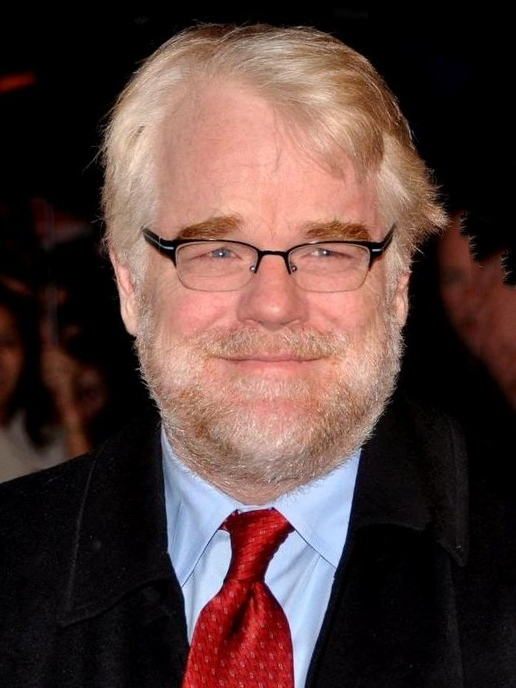
Philip Seymour Hoffman, Outstanding Performance by a Male Actor in a Leading Role winner

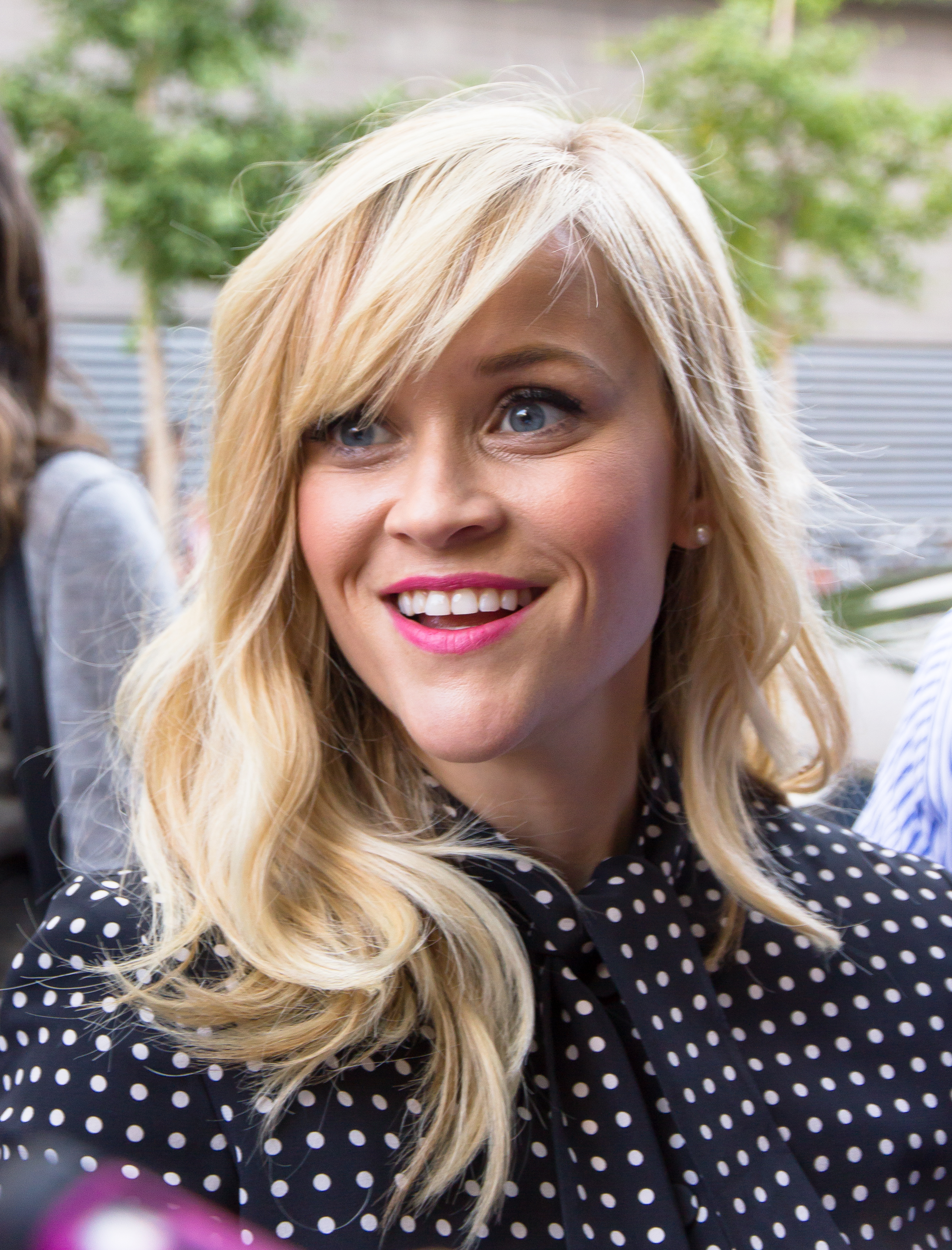
Reese Witherspoon, Outstanding Performance by a Female Actor in a Leading Role winner

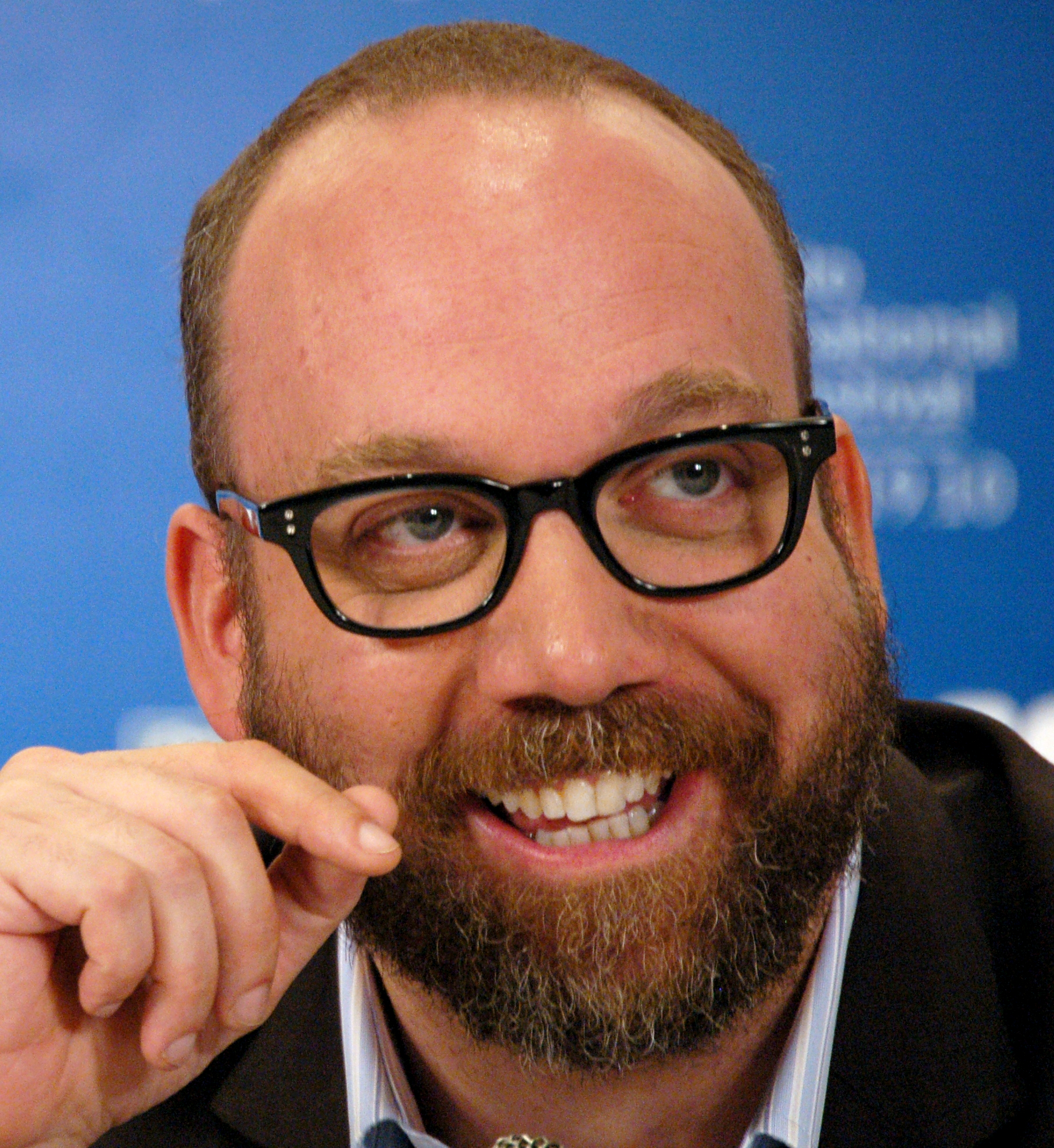
Paul Giamatti, Outstanding Performance by a Male Actor in a Supporting Role winner

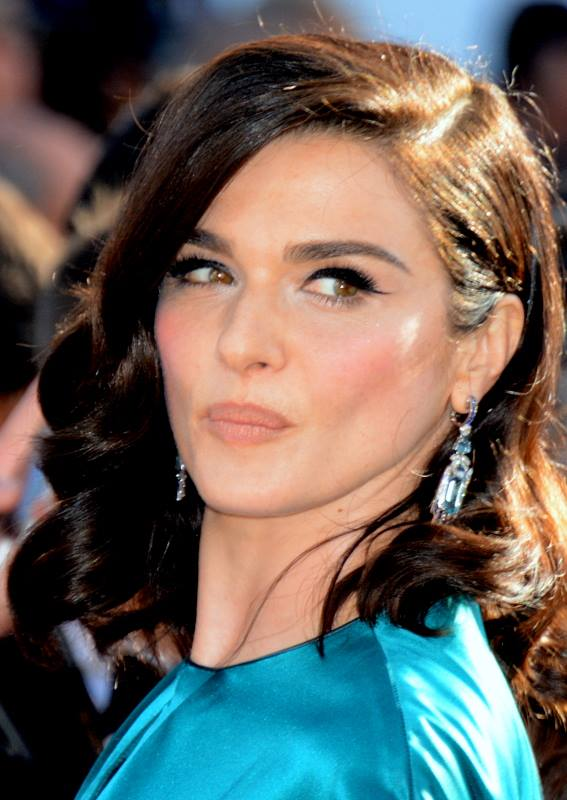
Rachel Weisz, Outstanding Performance by a Female Actor in a Supporting Role winner

Paul Newman, Outstanding Performance by a Male Actor in a Miniseries or Television Movie winner

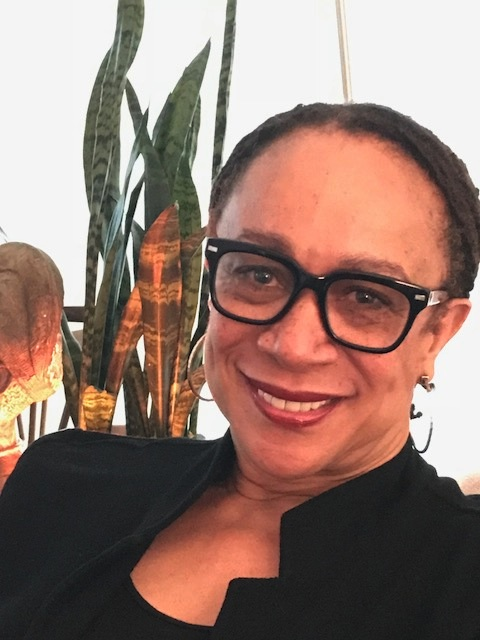
S. Epatha Merkerson, Outstanding Performance by a Female Actor in a Miniseries or Television Movie winner

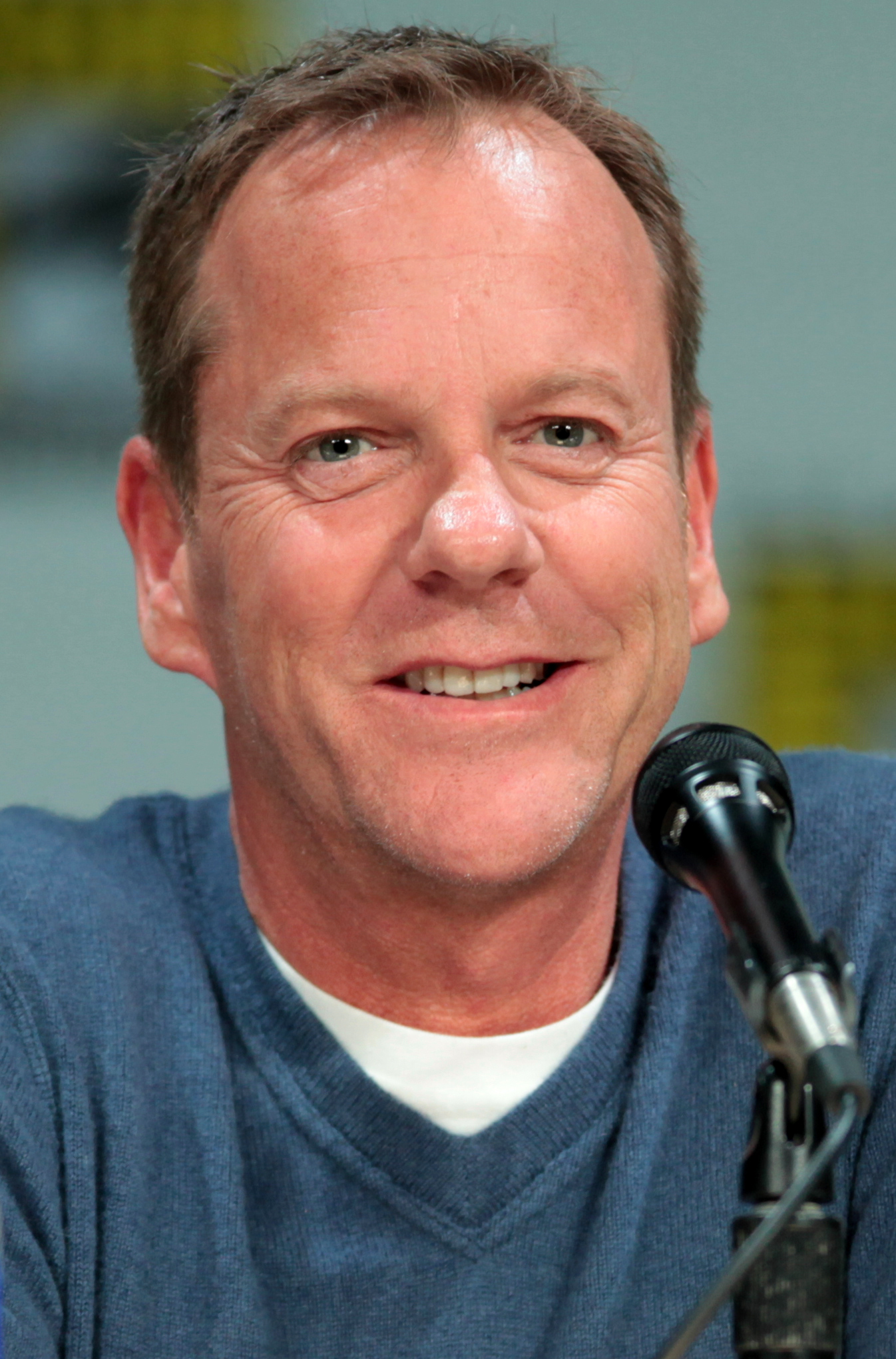
Kiefer Sutherland, Outstanding Performance by a Male Actor in a Drama Series winner

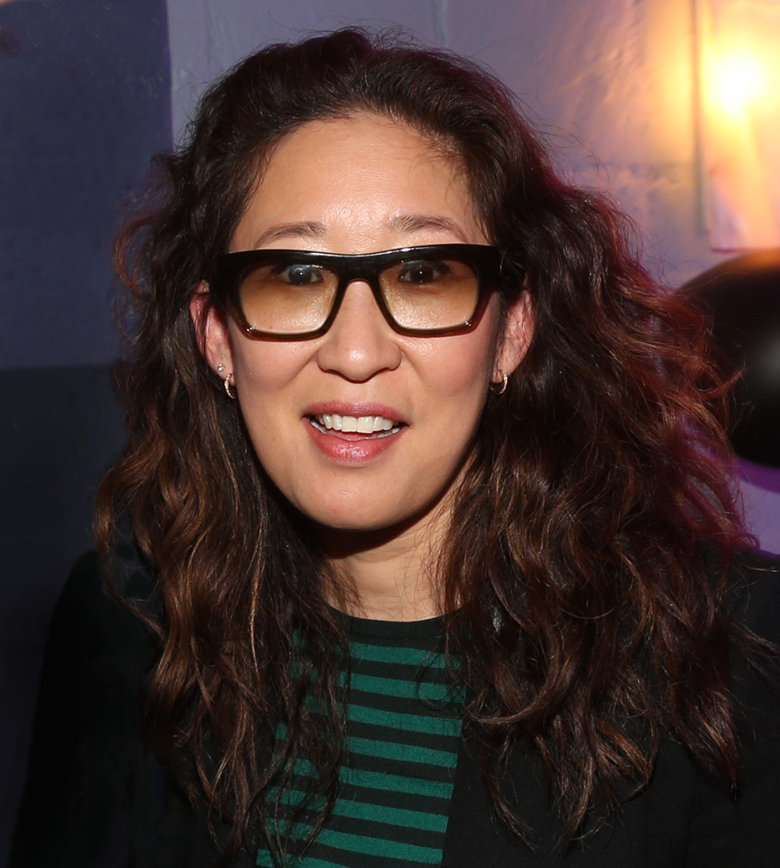
Sandra Oh, Outstanding Performance by a Female Actor in a Drama Series winner

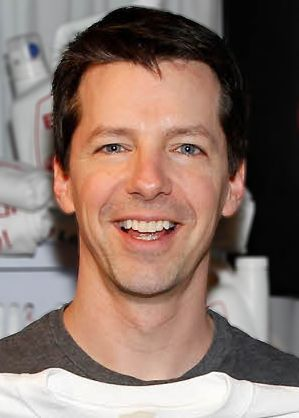
Sean Hayes, Outstanding Performance by a Male Actor in a Comedy Series winner

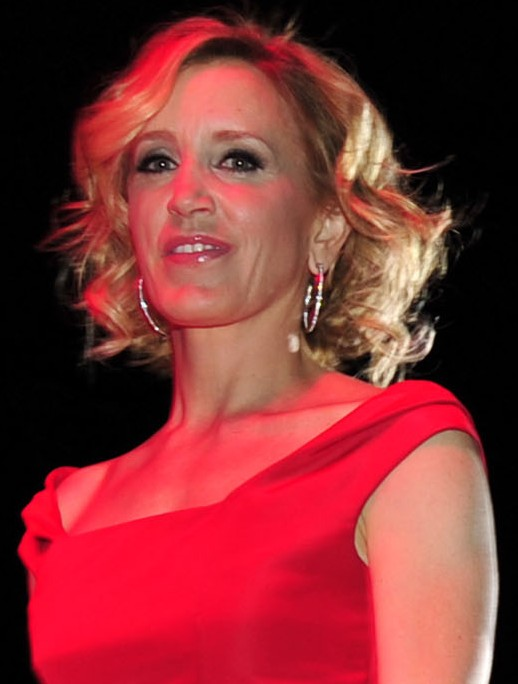
Felicity Huffman, Outstanding Performance by a Female Actor in a Comedy Series winner

=== Film ===
Outstanding Performance by a Male Actor in a Leading Role	Outstanding Performance by a Female Actor in a Leading Role
**Philip Seymour Hoffman – Capote as Truman Capote**; Russell Crowe – Cinderella Man as James Braddock; Heath Ledger – Brokeback Mountain as Ennis Del Mar; Joaquin Phoenix – Walk the Line as Johnny Cash; David Strathairn – Good Night, and Good Luck as Edward R. Murrow	**Reese Witherspoon – Walk the Line as June Carter Cash**; Judi Dench – Mrs Henderson Presents as Laura Henderson; Felicity Huffman – Transamerica as Sabrina "Bree" Osbourne; Charlize Theron – North Country as Josey Aimes; Zhang Ziyi – Memoirs of a Geisha as Chiyo Sakamoto
Outstanding Performance by a Male Actor in a Supporting Role	Outstanding Performance by a Female Actor in a Supporting Role
**Paul Giamatti – Cinderella Man as Joe Gould**; Don Cheadle – Crash as Graham Walters; George Clooney – Syriana as Bob Barnes; Matt Dillon – Crash as John Ryan; Jake Gyllenhaal – Brokeback Mountain as Jack Twist	**Rachel Weisz – The Constant Gardener as Tessa Quayle**; Amy Adams – Junebug as Ashley Johnsten; Catherine Keener – Capote as Harper Lee; Frances McDormand – North Country as Glory Dodge; Michelle Williams – Brokeback Mountain as Alma Beers Del Mar
Outstanding Performance by a Cast in a Motion Picture
**Crash – Chris "Ludacris" Bridges, Sandra Bullock, Don Cheadle, Matt Dillon, Jennifer Esposito, William Fichtner, Brendan Fraser, Terrence Howard, Thandie Newton, Ryan Phillippe, and Larenz Tate**; Brokeback Mountain – Linda Cardellini, Anna Faris, Jake Gyllenhaal, Anne Hathaway, Heath Ledger, Randy Quaid, and Michelle Williams; Capote – Bob Balaban, Marshall Bell, Clifton Collins Jr., Chris Cooper, Bruce Greenwood, Philip Seymour Hoffman, Catherine Keener, and Mark Pellegrino; Good Night, and Good Luck – Rose Abdoo, Alex Borstein, Robert John Burke, Patricia Clarkson, George Clooney, Jeff Daniels, Reed Diamond, Tate Donovan, Robert Downey Jr., Grant Heslov, Peter Jacobson, Frank Langella, Tom McCarthy, Dianne Reeves, Matt Ross, David Strathairn, and Ray Wise; Hustle & Flow – Anthony Anderson, Chris "Ludacris" Bridges, Isaac Hayes, Taraji P. Henson, Terrence Howard, Taryn Manning, Elise Neal, Paula Jai Parker, and DJ Qualls

=== Television ===
Outstanding Performance by a Male Actor in a Miniseries or Television Movie	Outstanding Performance by a Female Actor in a Miniseries or Television Movie
**Paul Newman – Empire Falls (HBO) as Max Roby**; Kenneth Branagh – Warm Springs (HBO) as Franklin Delano Roosevelt; Ted Danson – Knights of the South Bronx (A&E) as Richard Mason; Ed Harris – Empire Falls (HBO) as Miles Roby; Christopher Plummer – Our Fathers (Showtime) as Cardinal Bernard Law	**S. Epatha Merkerson – Lackawanna Blues (HBO) as Rachel "Nanny" Crosby**; Tonantzin Carmelo – Into the West (TNT) as Thunder Heart Woman; Cynthia Nixon – Warm Springs (HBO) as Eleanor Roosevelt; Joanne Woodward – Empire Falls (HBO) as Francine Whiting; Robin Wright – Empire Falls (HBO) as Grace Roby
Outstanding Performance by a Male Actor in a Drama Series	Outstanding Performance by a Female Actor in a Drama Series
**Kiefer Sutherland – 24 (Fox) as Jack Bauer**; Alan Alda – The West Wing (NBC) as Sen. Arnold Vinick; Patrick Dempsey – Grey's Anatomy (ABC) as Dr. Derek Shepherd; Hugh Laurie – House (Fox) as Dr. Gregory House; Ian McShane – Deadwood (HBO) as Al Swearengen	**Sandra Oh – Grey's Anatomy (ABC) as Cristina Yang**; Patricia Arquette – Medium (NBC) as Allison DuBois; Geena Davis – Commander in Chief (ABC) as Mackenzie Allen; Mariska Hargitay – Law & Order: Special Victims Unit (NBC) as Det. Olivia Benson; Kyra Sedgwick – The Closer (TNT) as Det. Brenda Leigh Johnson
Outstanding Performance by a Male Actor in a Comedy Series	Outstanding Performance by a Female Actor in a Comedy Series
**Sean Hayes – Will & Grace (NBC) as Jack McFarland**; Larry David – Curb Your Enthusiasm (HBO) as himself; Jason Lee – My Name Is Earl (NBC) as Earl J. Hickey; William Shatner – Boston Legal (ABC) as Denny Crane; James Spader – Boston Legal (ABC) as Alan Shore	**Felicity Huffman – Desperate Housewives (ABC) as Lynette Scavo**; Candice Bergen – Boston Legal (ABC) as Shirley Schmidt; Patricia Heaton – Everybody Loves Raymond (CBS) as Debra Barone; Megan Mullally – Will & Grace (NBC) as Karen Walker; Mary-Louise Parker – Weeds (Showtime) as Nancy Botwin
Outstanding Performance by an Ensemble in a Drama Series
**Lost (ABC) – Adewale Akinnuoye-Agbaje, Naveen Andrews, Emilie de Ravin, Matthew Fox, Jorge Garcia, Maggie Grace, Josh Holloway, Malcolm David Kelley, Daniel Dae Kim, Yunjin Kim, Evangeline Lilly, Dominic Monaghan, Terry O'Quinn, Harold Perrineau, Michelle Rodriguez, Ian Somerhalder, and Cynthia Watros**; The Closer (TNT) – G. W. Bailey, Michael Paul Chan, Raymond Cruz, Tony Denison, Robert Gossett, Gina Ravera, Corey Reynolds, Kyra Sedgwick, J. K. Simmons, and Jon Tenney; Grey's Anatomy (ABC) – Justin Chambers, Patrick Dempsey, Katherine Heigl, T. R. Knight, Sandra Oh, James Pickens Jr., Ellen Pompeo, Kate Walsh, Isaiah Washington, and Chandra Wilson; Six Feet Under (HBO) – Lauren Ambrose, Joanna Cassidy, Frances Conroy, James Cromwell, Rachel Griffiths, Michael C. Hall, Tina Holmes, Peter Krause, Justina Machado, Freddy Rodriguez, Jeremy Sisto, and Mathew St. Patrick; The West Wing (NBC) – Alan Alda, Kristin Chenoweth, Janeane Garofalo, Dulé Hill, Allison Janney, Joshua Malina, Mary McCormack, Janel Moloney, Teri Polo, Richard Schiff, Martin Sheen, Jimmy Smits, John Spencer, and Bradley Whitford
Outstanding Performance by an Ensemble in a Comedy Series
**Desperate Housewives (ABC) – Roger Bart, Andrea Bowen, Mehcad Brooks, Ricardo Antonio Chavira, Marcia Cross, Steven Culp, James Denton, Teri Hatcher, Felicity Huffman, Brent Kinsman, Shane Kinsman, Eva Longoria, Mark Moses, Doug Savant, Nicollette Sheridan, Brenda Strong, and Alfre Woodard**; Arrested Development (Fox) – Will Arnett, Jason Bateman, Michael Cera, David Cross, Portia de Rossi, Tony Hale, Alia Shawkat, Jeffrey Tambor, and Jessica Walter; Boston Legal (ABC) – Rene Auberjonois, Ryan Michelle Bathe, Candice Bergen, Julie Bowen, Justin Mentell, Rhona Mitra, Monica Potter, William Shatner, James Spader, and Mark Valley; Curb Your Enthusiasm (HBO) – Shelley Berman, Larry David, Susie Essman, Jeff Garlin, Cheryl Hines, and Richard Lewis; Everybody Loves Raymond (CBS) – Peter Boyle, Brad Garrett, Patricia Heaton, Monica Horan, Doris Roberts, Ray Romano, and Madylin Sweeten; My Name Is Earl (NBC) – Jason Lee, Jaime Pressly, Eddie Steeples, Ethan Suplee, and Nadine Velazquez

=== Screen Actors Guild Life Achievement Award ===
- Shirley Temple Black

== Multiple nominations ==
=== Film ===
Nominations	Film
4	Brokeback Mountain
3	Capote
3	Crash
2	Cinderella Man
2	Good Night, and Good Luck
2	North Country
2	Walk the Line

=== Television ===
Nominations	Program
4	Boston Legal
4	Empire Falls
3	Grey's Anatomy
2	The Closer
2	Curb Your Enthusiasm
2	Desperate Housewives
2	Everybody Loves Raymond
2	My Name Is Earl
2	Warm Springs
2	The West Wing
2	Will & Grace

== Multiple wins ==
=== Television ===
Wins	Program
2	Desperate Housewives

== In Memoriam ==
Samuel L. Jackson presented a visual salute to the members of the guild who died in 2005:

- Sandra Dee
- Eddie Albert
- Barbara Bel Geddes
- Bob Denver
- James Doohan
- Dana Elcar
- Wendie Jo Sperber
- J. D. Cannon
- Harold J. Stone
- Sheree North
- Don Adams
- Teresa Wright
- Lloyd Bochner
- Mason Adams
- Lane Smith
- Thurl Ravenscroft
- John Raitt
- Lou Rawls
- John Vernon
- Len Dressler
- John Fiedler
- Barney Martin
- Ruth Hussey
- Ford Rainey
- Brock Peters
- John Mills
- Frances Langford
- June Haver
- Dan O'Herlihy
- Geraldine Fitzgerald
- Anthony Franciosa
- Stephen Elliot
- Paul Winchell
- Frank Gorshin
- Shelley Winters
- Anne Bancroft
- Louis Nye
- Vincent Schiavelli
- John Spencer
- Pat Morita
- Richard Pryor
