= Imprint (film) =

- Directed by: Michael Linn
- Written by: Michael Linn; Keith Davenport
- Produced by: Chris Eyre; Carolyn Linn
- Cinematography: Michael Linn
- Edited by: Michael Linn; Marc Linn
- Release date: 2007
- Country: United States
- Language: English

Imprint is a 2007 independent drama/thriller film co-written and directed by Michael Linn and produced by Chris Eyre. The film is one of the only American films to feature an indigenous Native American lead role for an actress, played by Tongva-Kumeyaay actress Carmelo.

== Synopsis ==
Shayla is an attorney working in South Dakota who in the opening convicts a young Lakota boy in a homicide. She returns to her family home on the Lakota reservation to take a break from the toll the case took on her. Once there, she begins to hear and see visions that she believes to be from her recently departed father and later becomes convinced its an ominous sign of her missing brother. She seeks help from elders and their advice leads her to confront some truths about her life and the people in it. Along the way she ends a relationship and possibly begins a new one with a local tribal officer who helps her investigate the mystery.

== Cast ==
- Tonantzin Carmelo as Shayla
- Michael Spears as Tom
- Cory Brusseau as Jonathan
- Carla-Rae Holland as Rebecca
- Charlie White Buffalo as Sam
- Dave Bald Eagle as Medicine Man

== Awards and nominations ==
Year	Award	Winner/Nominee	Category	Result
2007	American Indian Film Festival	Michael Linn	Best Film	Won
2007	American Indian Film Festival	Michael Linn	Best Director	Nominated
2007	American Indian Film Festival	Michael Spears	Best Actor	Nominated
2007	American Indian Film Festival	Tonantzin Carmelo	Best Actress	Won
2007	American Indian Film Festival	Carla-Rae Holland	Best Supporting Actress	Won
2007	Cherokee International Film Festival	Michael Linn	Best Feature	Won
2008	Hoboken International Film Festival	Michael Linn	Best Cinematography	Won
2008	South Dakota Film Festival	Michael Linn	Best Feature	Won
