= Into the West (miniseries) =

2005 television miniseries

- Promotional poster
- Genre: Western; Historical drama
- Written by: William Mastrosimone; Cyrus Nowrasteh; Craig Storper; Kirk Ellis
- Directed by: Robert Dornhelm; Simon Wincer; Sergio Mimica-Gezzan; Michael W. Watkins; Timothy Van Patten; Jeremy Podeswa
- Starring: Various
- Narrated by: Matthew Settle; Joseph M. Marshall III
- Music by: Geoff Zanelli
- Country of origin: United States
- No. of episodes: 6

Production
- Executive producer: Steven Spielberg
- Producer: Larry Rapaport
- Production location: Drumheller, Alberta, Canada; Santa Fe, New Mexico, U.S.
- Cinematography: Alan Caso; William Wages
- Editors: Mark Conte; Sabrina Plisco
- Running time: 552 minutes
- Production companies: DreamWorks Television; Voice Pictures

Original release
- Network: TNT
- Release: June 10 – July 22, 2005

Into the West is a 2005 American Western television miniseries produced by Steven Spielberg and DreamWorks, with six two-hour episodes (including commercials). The series was first broadcast in the U.S. on TNT beginning June 10, 2005. It was also shown in the UK on BBC2 and BBC HD from November 4, 2006, and in Canada on CBC Television. The series also aired in the U.S. on AMC during June/July and September/October of 2012.

The plot follows the story of two families, one white American and one Native American, as their lives become mingled through the momentous events of American expansion. The miniseries begins in the 1820s and is told mainly through the third person narration of Jacob Wheeler (Matthew Settle) and Loved By the Buffalo (Joseph M. Marshall III), although episodes outside the direct observation of both protagonists are also shown. The story intertwines real and fictional characters and events spanning the period of expansion of the United States in the American frontier from 1825 to 1890. It was filmed in Drumheller, Alberta and Santa Fe, New Mexico.

The show has a large ensemble cast, with about 250 speaking parts. The series features well-known performers including Josh Brolin, Gary Busey, Michael Spears, Tonantzin Carmelo, Skeet Ulrich, Garrett Wang, Steve Reevis, Rachael Leigh Cook, Wes Studi, Irene Bedard, Alan Tudyk, Christian Kane, Russell Means, Jay Tavare, Keri Russell, Graham Greene, Sean Astin, Beau Bridges, Judge Reinhold, Zahn McClarnon, Tom Berenger, Gil Birmingham, David Paymer, Raoul Trujillo, Eric Schweig, Lance Henriksen, Simon R. Baker, Tyler Christopher, Tatanka Means, Gordon Tootoosis, Sheila Tousey, Annabella Piugattuk, Glen Powell and Will Patton.

It was nominated for 16 Primetime Emmy Awards, including for Outstanding Limited Series, and won two. It was also nominated for a Golden Globe Award for Best Mini-Series Or Motion Picture Made for Television.

== Episodes ==
=== Episode 1: "Wheel to the Stars" ===
Growling Bear, an elderly Lakota medicine man, has an apocalyptic vision that the buffalo his people rely upon will soon vanish from the prairie and the Lakota will live in square houses. His vision is controversial and his apprentice, Soaring Eagle, convinces most of the people to disregard Growling Bear's dark vision. A young boy named White Feather overhears and seeks out the now discredited Growling Bear to learn more about his vision. Before he dies, Growling Bear gives White Feather a necklace symbolizing the Lakota medicine wheel. This necklace is passed on to various characters through the miniseries.

Later, during a buffalo jump hunt led by White Feather's older brothers Running Fox and Dog Star, many people from the village are killed during the stampede, but White Feather is miraculously spared when the spirit of deceased Growling Bear appears to protect him. The tribe renames him Loved by the Buffalo and begin to regard him as a holy man healing people by taking their pain upon himself. This causes Soaring Eagle to become jealous and he tries to undermine Loved by the Buffalo by blaming him for an outbreak of pox and then leaving him for dead. Growling Bear appears to Loved by the Buffalo again, teaching him a song to cure the outbreak.

Loved by the Buffalo's sister, Thunder Heart Woman, is married off to a white trapper, Thomas Lebeck. Loved by the Buffalo gives Thunder Heart Woman the wooden medicine wheel necklace as a parting gift. Dog Star and Running Fox marry two sisters and begin families, but Loved by the Buffalo realizes that his destiny lies on a different path.

At about the same time, a young wheelwright named Jacob Wheeler is growing discontented with his settled life in the fictional Wheelerton, Virginia, where he and his brothers work as wheelwrights for his grandfather Abraham, a veteran of the Battle of Yorktown. When a mountain man named James Fletcher passes through, he tells Jacob of the wonders of the western frontier and that he will be joining an expedition to the Pacific Ocean led by the famous Jedediah Smith leaving from St. Louis, Jacob decides to leave his family and head west. He convinces his brother Nathan, to come west with him, but another brother, Jethro, cannot bring himself to leave his home and stays behind.

Once the brothers reach St. Louis, Missouri, they find Fletcher, who rebuffs them. Dejected, Nathan goes into a saloon to drink and gamble, winning a deed to a land claim in the Mexican province of Tejas. Nathan tries to convince Jacob to come with him to Tejas, but Jacob has become determined to become a mountain man and travel to the West with Jedediah Smith. The brothers part company and Jacob heads toward the Rocky Mountains.

Jacob catches up with Fletcher and trapping party captain Jedediah Smith who once again rebuffs him, but he convinces them to take him in. Jacob stitches Smith's scalp after a bear attack and prefers Smith's company rather than fraternizing with a Mojave tribe they trade with for horses in the Sierra Nevada. Eventually he becomes a trusted member of the party. Jacob accompanies Smith's party to California, where they are arrested by the Mexican Capitan de Salamanca for trespassing and held at the San Gabriel Mission. The party is charged with stealing the horses they bought from the Mojave (a brand is shown). The Mexicans fear that if they are freed, the party will show other Americans how to go to California. Smith negotiates their expulsion, promising they would never return to California under pain of death. On the way back, they return to the Mohave camp and are attacked; many are killed including Fletcher, who guards Smith and Jacob's narrow escape through a cave. Loved by the Buffalo undergoes a Sun Dance.

Thunder Heart Woman's trapper husband Lebeck is killed in an attack by the Crow, her infant daughter is captured, and she is sold into slavery. Later, Jacob sees her being auctioned off at a trapper rendezvous and attempts to buy her in order to return Thunder Heart Woman to her people. Trapper Johnny Fox rifle duels Jacob for the right to purchase her. Jacob is victorious, shooting then stabbing Fox one-handed after being shot in his left forearm. Thunder Heart Woman gives Jacob the wooden medicine wheel necklace as a token of her gratitude. When they return to the tribe, Jacob marries Thunder Heart Woman and begins to live with her family as part of the Lakota tribe.

Running Fox trades for a horsecart, much to the dismay of his brothers, who see white goods as a corruption of Lakota culture. When Loved by the Buffalo sees Jacob repairing the wheel, he is reminded of a vision he had during his Sun Dance in which a wooden wheel smashes a stone wheel. Loved by the Buffalo realizes that the wooden wheel symbolizes the wagon wheels of the whites and that the stone wheel is the medicine wheel of the Lakota culture. Loved by the Buffalo takes Jacob and Thunder Heart Woman to a sacred hilltop where a stone medicine wheel has been erected and tells him about the four great powers that it symbolizes. Loved by the Buffalo leaves the tribe to try to prevent the vision of Growling Bear from coming to pass.

=== Episode 2: "Manifest Destiny" ===
After living among the Lakota people, Jacob decides to take his wife and daughter Margaret Light Shines east to Wheelerton, Virginia. Jacob's family gives Thunder Heart Woman a much colder reception than her family gave him. After living in Wheelerton for a time, Jacob decides to take his family, now including a young son Abraham High Wolf, back west.

This time, Jacob's brother Jethro decides to come along. They are also accompanied by Jacob's three young female cousins; Leah Wheeler, Rachel Wheeler, and Naomi Wheeler. The three girls have been unlucky in love and are lured by the tales of excitement out west.

Meanwhile, Thunder Heart Woman's two oldest brothers, Dog Star and Running Fox argue over whether or not to adopt white technology. The disagreement comes to a boil and the two agree to part ways, splitting the tribe.

After working their way west for several years, the Wheeler clan arrives at Independence, Missouri. Jacob, now with a second son Jacob Junior High Cloud, wants to go west to California or the Oregon Country, but Thunder Heart Woman and some of the others wish to remain in Missouri. Jacob eventually convinces the others to go to California and they join a wagon train led by Stephen Hoxie who is a better salesman than a leader. Among the other settlers is a German immigrant preacher named Hobbes, a free black family fleeing racial prejudice, and several former mountain men.

The wagon train passage is filled with dangers: Leah Wheeler is thrown from the wagon during the crossing of a river and drowns, and the young son of the black pioneers is killed by stampeding cattle during a thunder storm. But life also continues: Rachel and Naomi take husbands from among the wagon trail guides. Later, while traversing a pass, a wagon breaks free, knocks Rachel down and runs over her leg, causing a severe compound fracture. The leg eventually becomes infected and must be amputated. Preacher Hobbes is the closest thing to a doctor available, but he botches the operation and Rachel dies.

Cholera breaks out, killing the wife of the black pioneer. Those exposed, including Jacob, Thunder Heart Woman, the children, and Jethro must stay behind under quarantine while the main body of the wagon train carries on. Naomi and her husband, who have not been exposed, go on with the others. Jethro is afflicted with symptoms of cholera but recovers, and no new outbreaks occur after Jacob orders that all drinking water be boiled. They rush to catch up with the main body, but find it was attacked by Cheyenne warriors, and all except Naomi were killed.

Naomi, taken into captivity, is sold to Cheyenne chief Prairie Fire, who takes her as his wife. The thought of a forced marriage to an Indian is repulsive to Naomi, who has always considered them as barely human savages. She chants nursery rhymes, which put off his amorous advances. In time, she begins to see Prairie Fire in a different light and she grows to become happy in her new life. She eventually gives birth to a son, whom he names One Horn Bull.

Jacob returns to the rest of the wagons, and they are soon attacked. The Indians are fought off, but an arrow is shot through Jacob's upper chest, and he begs to be left behind to recover on his own terms as the trail would kill him faster. After the party leaves, Jacob is rescued by a party led by Running Fox, that stumble across him half-dead. After recovering his strength, Jacob spends several months in the mountains. Haunted by the faces of the children he sent on with his wife and brother, Jacob eventually tries to find them in California. He searches several years for his family but cannot find them, and eventually gives them up for dead.

The Mexican–American War erupts and Jacob joins John C. Frémont's militia to fight the Mexican Army. During a supply stop in one of the settlements, he sees his wife at a distance, but before he can go over to greet her, he sees her and his brother Jethro embrace and kiss. They also have a new child, Cornflower. Dejected that his wife and brother have become romantically involved but not wanting to disrupt their happiness, he decides to leave without making his presence known. Before he goes, he gives the wooden medicine wheel necklace to his young son, who does not realize the man is his father.

Meanwhile, Dog Star and Running Fox are still estranged. The other tribes that have been trading with the whites for rifles, particularly the Crow, have grown stronger, and the Lakota are now at a disadvantage. Seeking guidance, Dog Star visits the stone medicine wheel, where he meets Loved by the Buffalo. Loved by the Buffalo tells his brother that his lifetime quest is to preserve the traditional ways. The whites at the forts refuse to trade pistols to the Lakota, instead giving them whiskey, and drunkenness soon becomes a problem. Loved by the Buffalo also appears to his brother Running Fox in a vision. Running Fox and Dog Star eventually reconcile and agree to no longer trade for white goods.

Thunder Heart Woman finds the wooden medicine wheel necklace and realizes that her husband is still alive. She feels that it is best not to go after him, but their daughter Margaret Light Shines Wheeler is determined to find him.

=== Episode 3: "Dreams and Schemes" ===
Jethro and Thunder Heart Woman remain together in California and a daughter, Corn Flower, is born to them. While working at the Wheeler ranch, now dubbed Rancho Paradiso, Jethro encounters a 49er named Martin Jarrett who brings him the first news about the California gold rush. Jethro soon follows him to the nearby American River to prospect for gold, although he returns home each night.

Jethro dreams of quick riches but all he finds are a few small grains. Undeterred, he begins to spend more and more time looking for gold. Without Jethro's labor, the ranch begins to run into difficulties, with essential repairs being left undone. Jethro also takes to drinking heavily to counter the frigid waters of the river and becomes abusive towards Thunder Heart Woman and the children. After one too many arguments turn violent, Abe High Wolf Wheeler decides to leave.

Jethro's cousin, David Wheeler, arrives as a 49er and becomes Jethro's partner in prospecting for gold. Angered by the successes of a group of Chinese immigrant miners, Jethro and David drive them off and steal their claim. After finding a huge nugget of gold, Jethro and David argue over how they will split their new fortune. David insists that half of the nugget should be divided amongst each other, especially when David was the first to find it. Greedy over the find, Jethro coldly replies that it was his claim, so David is entitled to perhaps a quarter of the money, maybe even a third of it just because they happen to be related. After Jethro falls asleep, David steals the nugget and heads toward San Francisco. Jethro follows him downriver and the both of them exchange gun fire in desperation. As David tries to escape in a canoe, Jethro attempts to board the canoe and David kills him with an oar to the head. Right afterwards, David loses his balance due to the weight of the gold nugget in his pack, falls into the river, and drowns when the weight of the nugget takes him to the bottom. To support her family, Thunder Heart Woman starts to sell food and supplies to the miners.

Meanwhile, Margaret Light Shines Wheeler has taken a job in a guest house in San Francisco, but continues to look for her father. Jacob remained with the army, but became disillusioned at the treatment of Native Americans in Oregon and returned to trapping in the mountains in California. After spotting an army unit sporting a Bear Flag, Margaret inquires if any of them know Jacob Wheeler. A sergeant tells her that Jacob is among them and says he will lead her to him. When the two enter a barn, he tries to rape her. Margaret is saved by Ethan Biggs, a British immigrant photographer. Margaret goes to work for Biggs and the two eventually fall in love and marry.

While working in the photo studio, a local wheelwright tells Margaret a trapper in the mountains has fixed a broken wagon wheel for some settlers. Certain that it's her father, Margaret convinces Biggs to join her looking for the trapper's camp. When they find the camp, Jacob at first takes them for thieves and nearly shoots them. Margaret shows him the wooden medicine wheel necklace and he realizes that she is his daughter. Jacob then goes to Rancho Paradiso and is reunited with his family.

On the plains, white encroachment has become an undeniable problem for the tribes. Running Fox and Dog Star join several other chiefs—including Conquering Bear—at the signing of the Treaty of Fort Laramie (1851). All three agree that the peace is precarious but decide to give the agreement a chance.

A little later, Loved by the Buffalo is visiting Conquering Bear's village. A cow escapes from a passing Mormon wagon train and rampages through the village, causing considerable damage. The villagers try to give the cow back to the settlers, but they become frightened at the sight of the Indians and run away. The tribe decides to keep the cow as compensation for the damage and butcher it. A platoon of soldiers soon arrive, in command of a lieutenant who has no respect for the Native Americans. The lieutenant demands that the cow be returned and the "thief" be handed over. Conquering Bear tries to explain the situation to the soldiers, but his efforts are thwarted by a drunken scout who intentionally mistranslates the negotiations. The lieutenant orders his soldiers to open fire on the village, but the warriors fight back. Conquering Bear is killed, but his warriors manage to kill the lieutenant, the drunken translator, and every single soldier in the party. (Note: this event is based on the August 1854 Grattan massacre.)

A few years later, another Wheeler cousin, Samson Wheeler has moved to Lawrence, Kansas with his family—his wife Susannah, sons Aaron and Jeremiah, and adopted daughter Clara. An anti-slavery Unionist himself, Samson allies with the abolitionist Jayhawkers during the days of "Bleeding Kansas" as tensions rise in the months leading up to the Civil War. He refuses to leave the town despite being threatened by Border Ruffian leader Bloody Bill Anderson for hiring Henry Foster, a black worker. Lawrence is later attacked by Anderson's bushwackers and Quantrill's Raiders. In the raid, Samson, Susannah and their two sons are killed, leaving Clara as the only survivor. She then leaves Kansas to seek out her cousins in Omaha, Nebraska.

Jacob Wheeler's sons take different paths. Abe Wheeler has become a rider for the Pony Express. Despite being an excellent rider, he loses his job when the Pony Express is superseded by the telegraph. Jacob Wheeler Jr. also decides to leave the family ranch to strike out on his own. Leaving California for the great plains, his knowledge of the Lakota language is valuable to the army and he is hired as a scout.

Dog Star's son, Brings Horse is shot by an army sniper when he climbs a telegraph pole to investigate the wires strung from the top and cutting them. Sleeping Bear, Dog Star's surviving son, pledges revenge against the whites for what they have done.

=== Episode 4: "Hell on Wheels" ===
In December 1863, Clara Wheeler makes her journey to Omaha and finds her cousins, Daniel Wheeler, his wife Esther and his children Robert, Jackson, Thomas and Lilly. Daniel is pursuing the family trade as a wheelwright. He is not happy to see Clara (in the previous episode Samson mentioned that he never was on good terms with Daniel, although the reason is never revealed) and intends to send her away to the war-raged East, but he is persuaded by his wife and his son Robert to take Clara in, on the condition that Robert takes the sole responsibility for Clara. It is obvious that Clara is traumatized from the deaths of her family, but she is quickly comforted by Robert's caring presence.

The race is on as the Central Pacific and Union Pacific Railroads lay down tracks across the U.S., bringing East and West together. Jacob Wheeler's son Abe joins the construction crew of the Central Pacific railroad, working east from Sacramento. Working conditions are hard, and many workers leave to prospect for gold in the Californian goldfields. Chinese workers ("Coolies") are brought in from San Francisco to supplement the work crews. Abe meets and befriends Chow-Ping Yen, and they work in difficult conditions into and through the Sierra Nevada. Chow-Ping saves Abe's life when he almost falls from a bosun's chair while setting dynamite to construct a shelf along a cliff face.

In March 1864, while photographing California Governor Frederick Low, Ethan Biggs and his wife, Margaret Light Shines (Jacob's daughter), decide to see the Indian Territory, and they take a stagecoach to Denver. In Denver, they hear Colonel John Chivington speak against the Indians and recruit for the Third Colorado Cavalry. Ethan and Margaret's stagecoach is ambushed by Cheyenne warriors after leaving Denver. The other passengers are killed, but they are captured by Roman Nose and taken to the camp of Black Kettle. Although the Cheyenne are hostile at first, Ethan and Margaret demonstrate their photographic equipment to the curious Cheyenne, and come to appreciate the Indian's hospitality.

While Ethan photographs the people of Black Kettle's camp, Margaret works to establish peace between the Cheyenne and the local Governor and Army. On September 28, 1864, Black Kettle holds council with Colorado Territory Governor John Evans, Colonel Chivington and Major Wynkoop, to ensure peace. The Indians make clear their desire for peace, but the negotiations end inconclusively.

Margaret and Ethan decide to continue their journey, but, on November 29, 1864, the night before they have planned to leave, Colonel Chivington attacks Black Kettle's village at the head of the Third Colorado Cavalry. Most of the village, including Ethan, are killed at the Sand Creek Massacre. Margaret is saved by Black Kettle and flees with the survivors.

Further altercations between the Indians and the American settlers leads Red Cloud to begin to gather the forces that will lead to Red Cloud's War. On December 21, 1866, a large band of Cheyenne and Sioux under Crazy Horse attack a supply train near Fort Phil Kearny. Capt. Fetterman leads a relief party of 80 men. Ignoring orders not to venture beyond Lodge Trail Ridge, he led his troops into an ambush. He and his entire party were killed in the attack, later called the Fetterman Massacre.

General William Tecumseh Sherman meets with Black Kettle and other Indian Chiefs, and Margaret watches another treaty being signed. Despite the treaty, Col George Armstrong Custer and the 7th Cavalry attack Black Kettle's Cheyenne village at the Battle of Washita River on November 27, 1868. Jacob Jr. has been serving as a scout for the U.S. Army with Custer. Margaret is taken captive with other Indian women. They are taken to an Army Fort, where she is reunited with her brother Jacob Jr., who tries to help her escape. She refuses, insisting on staying with her adopted Indian family. Eventually, the U.S. Army abandons some forts, and the second Treaty of Fort Laramie creates the Great Sioux reservation.

Abe Wheeler continues to work on the railroad until the First transcontinental railroad was completed on May 10, 1869, when the driving of the Golden Spike joins the Union Pacific and Central Pacific Railroads at Promontory Summit in Utah. Abe parts company with Chow-Ping.

Meanwhile, Daniel Wheeler is seeking fortune by collaborating with Central Pacific Railroads and creating railroad boomtowns, exploiting the debaucheries of new settlers. He starts with North Platte, Nebraska with his sons Robert and Jackson as assistants, and by May 1868 they are in Cheyenne. Robert brings Clara along, and romance develops between them, while Daniel strongly disapproves their relationship. Robert disagrees with Daniel's corruptive way of business, and grows distant from his father. After the Transcontinental Railroad is completed, Robert and Clara decide to strike out on their own, leaving behind the life dominated by the greedy Daniel.

=== Episode 5: "Casualties of War" ===
Gold is discovered in the Black Hills in 1874. The Black Hills are considered by the Lakota to be the axis mundi, or center of the world, and the 1868 Treaty of Fort Laramie granted the Indians ownership of the mountain range. Now, settlers trespass on their land to prospect for gold, and the U.S. Army moves in to take possession. Conflict over control of the region sparks the Black Hills War, the last major Indian War on the Great Plains.

Red Cloud continues to talk of peace with the whites at Pine Ridge Indian Reservation, but many young men leave to join Sitting Bull, including cousins White Bird—son of Sleeping Bear and grandson of Dog Star—and Red Lance—grandson of Running Fox and son of White Crow. Red Lance's younger brother, Voices That Carry, wants to go with his brother, but is required to stay behind with his grand-uncle Dog Star because of his youth. Red Cloud thinks that the "peace talkers" from Washington will honor the Treaty of Fort Laramie and keep other whites out of the Black Hills.

Robert Wheeler is operating a general store in Hillsgate, Dakota Territory, while Clara spends her spare time teaching the town's children. Their store prospers as a result of the Black Hills Gold Rush and the many who rush into the area to find gold. In October 1874, Robert agrees to take a prospector into the Black Hills for $10, but they are attacked by two bushwhackers and the prospector is killed. Robert kills the two bushwhackers in turn with his Sharps Buffalo Rifle. Though he is safely home, Clara is angry with Robert for risking his life to make money. Clara buys a typewriter from a traveling salesman. Robert invests the profits from the store in about 100 Buffalo hides for $3 each, expecting to make a profit from the craze for buffalo bedspreads and overcoats, but finds that fashions have moved on and he cannot sell them to Douglas Hillman for more than $1 each. Instead, he gives them to the needy Indians at a nearby reservation. While there, he meets Captain Richard Henry Pratt, who commends his actions.

Margaret Light Shines has been a prisoner of the Army since the Battle of Washita River, but she finds purpose helping the women and orphaned children at the same Indian Reservation as Red Cloud. Voices That Carry runs away from the camp of Red Cloud to join his father, White Crow, with Sitting Bull.

In June 1876, Jacob Wheeler Jr. is still a scout for Lieutenant Colonel George Armstrong Custer and the 7th U.S. Cavalry. On the morning of the Battle of the Little Bighorn, Custer dispatches Jacob Jr. with a message to Captain Frederick Benteen. Jacob Jr. gives a letter for his parents to a friend who is assigned to Major Marcus Reno's group, in case he should not survive Custer's plan. As he foresaw, Jacob is killed before he finds Benteen, as Crazy Horse and a Lakota-Northern Cheyenne combined force wipe out Custer's cavalry detachment. Among those who are also killed is White Bird. Voices That Carry brings the body of his cousin back to Dog Star in Red Cloud's camp.

After the final letter from Jacob Jr. reaches them, Jacob and Thunder Heart Woman go to Hillsgate in an effort to find Jacob Jr.'s resting place. They meet Robert and Clara, who take them to the scene of the battle. It is learnt that Robert and Clara had a son, William, who died from a fever. Clara is unable to let go of the painful memory and there is some strain in her relationship with Robert.

Following the defeat of the Sioux and their allies later in 1876, the United States "purchased" the Black Hills region (no actual purchase was ever completed and this area is under dispute to this day).

In 1879, Richard Henry Pratt returns to Hillsgate, and invites Robert and Clara to join him in teaching at an experimental school in Pennsylvania designed to "civilize" Native American children. Pratt persuades the Lakota that their children need to learn the white men's ways. He takes 125 Lakota children to the Carlisle Indian Industrial School in Carlisle, Pennsylvania. President Rutherford B. Hayes had arranged for the Carlisle Barracks to be made available. Among the children is Voices That Carry, who encourages the other Native Americans to resist assimilation. Voices That Carry's numerous attempts to undermine the process upset Pratt, but Robert tries to convince the boy to work hard so he can record the story of his people. Voices That Carry and Robert form a tentative friendship. After 6 months in Carlisle, Robert falls out with Pratt over his strict teaching methods, and heads back for home with Clara, who is now bearing their second child. Before they set off, Clara leaves her typewriter to Voices That Carry.

=== Episode 6: "Ghost Dance" ===
Ten years have passed since the end of Episode 5. Robert and Clara Wheeler return home, disillusioned by the school they have been hired to run, and Clara begins to teach Native American children on the reservation. Loved by the Buffalo believes he has found the foretold prophet when a mysterious Indian named Wovoka inspires his people with the Ghost Dance and a vision of their restored land at a Paiute reservation, the Yerington Indian Colony near Yerington, Nevada. But the ritual stirs up more fear among those who wish to contain the Native Americans. Voices That Carry is reunited with his brother Red Lance. Within weeks, the Ghost Dance becomes a phenomenon in the reservation. Local white governors and suppliers, who are tasked with the job of providing clothing and food for the Natives, become fearful of an Indian uprising. Local newspaper reporters overly exaggerate the dance as being sadistic and rebellious in nature. Margaret Light Shines is living in the reservation to help tend to the local children and sick. One of the newspaper reporters, not realizing she speaks English and knows how to use a camera, confronts her and trades his camera for a Ghost Shirt. Margaret Light Shines then uses the camera to record her version of the history.

After Sitting Bull is "accidentally" killed by Indian Police sent by the Indian Agent, the Ghost Dance rebellion grows, which in turn leads to more brutality toward the Native Americans. Indian Agent Daniel Royer, fearful of the Ghost Dance, sends for help and Colonel James W. Forsyth arrives with the 7th Cavalry Regiment. The 7th Cavalry regiment moves outward from the reservation into the hills and valleys restricted of Indian settlement where Big Foot and his followers are hiding out. Fearful of the slaughter of his people who are poorly armed, Big Foot agrees to return to the reservation peacefully.

Jacob Wheeler and his wife Thunder Heart Woman decide to move to South Dakota to settle in with the people they care about—Robert and Clara. Margaret Light Shines walks past and sees a missing person search notice (put up by Robert) and realizes her family is nearby. She is taken back by Robert and reunites with her parents.

While on the journey back to the reservation settlement, the groups stop and rest at a valley called Wounded Knee. While there, Colonel Forsyth requests Big Foot's men turn over all their weapons. They do so peacefully; however, when Forsyth sees how few arms Big Foot's men are carrying, he becomes angry. Believing his reports that Big Foot's men were well armed, the soldiers begin tearing apart the camp, taking anything that could be used as a weapon, including sticks and utensils. One of Big Foot's warriors, Black Coyote, is deaf and did not hear the request to turn in his gun. When a U.S. soldier attempts to pry it from his hands, the gun goes off by accident. The American soldiers then open fire at will upon Big Foot and his people. While Big Foot's men rush to pick up their weapons and defend themselves, the women and children run in opposite directions only to be mowed down by the 7th Cavalry's gunfire. Most of the Natives, including Big Foot, are slaughtered. Robert Wheeler, who was attached to the 7th Cavalry in supplying Big Foot's men with blankets and food, survives the massacre but was injured by artillery.

The survivors of the massacre are marched back to the reservation. Word goes round rapidly about the slaughter and Margaret Light Shines goes out to the field at Wounded Knee to photograph the massacre. While there, she meets and photographs the newspaper reporter who sold her the camera, who is looking with horror at the sight of the hundreds of frozen dead bodies which he indirectly had contributed to. She is also reunited with her uncle Loved By the Buffalo, who is performing the death rites for the deceased. Margaret brings him to meet her parents, Thunder Heart Woman and Jacob Wheeler.

Loved By the Buffalo and Jacob Wheeler meet again, closing a circle that began many years ago, and Loved By the Buffalo comes to realize that his destiny was not to prevent what was destined to happen, but to preserve it and the memory of his people; to teach the young Lakota children the ways of their people. "So long as there are still a few Lakota left who understand the traditional ways of their people, the tribe, history, and the memories and lessons of our past can still be preserved so that future generations may also learn from them."

The final scene shows Loved By the Buffalo sitting with a group of Lakota children, Margaret, and Thunder Heart Woman, teaching them the past of the people and his own experiences. At the same time miles away, Robert and Clara are expecting another child. Jacob is sitting on the porch with Robert and Clara's son Jedediah, telling him about his own experiences, past, and the lessons he has to teach.

- "The only history a man knows for certain is that small part he owns for himself."—Jacob Wheeler
- "I always told my children—you are one part Lakota and one part Virginia—be proud of both."—Jacob Wheeler
- "When you tell these stories, you touch the Grandmothers and Grandfathers."—Loved by the Buffalo

== Cast ==
Listed below are the major characters and the actors who play them. Some of the characters are portrayed at different ages by different actors.

- Loved by the Buffalo: played by Chevez Ezaneh, Simon R. Baker, George Leach, Steve Reevis, Joseph M. Marshall III
- Thunder Heart Woman: played by Sarah Weston, Tonantzin Carmelo, Sheila Tousey
- Running Fox: played by Mathew Strongeagle, Zahn McClarnon, Russell Means
- Dog Star: played by Pony Boy Osuniga, Michael Spears, Gil Birmingham
- Growling Bear: played by Gordon Tootoosis
- Jacob Wheeler: played by Matthew Settle, John Terry
- Jethro Wheeler: played by Skeet Ulrich
- Nathan Wheeler: played by Alan Tudyk
- Jedediah Smith: played by Josh Brolin
- James Fletcher: played by Will Patton
- Johnny Fox: played by Gary Busey
- Naomi Wheeler: played by Keri Russell
- Rachel Wheeler: played by Jessica Capshaw
- Leah Wheeler: played by Emily Holmes
- Stephen Hoxie: played by Beau Bridges
- Preacher Hobbes: played by Derek de Lint
- Prairie Fire: played by Jay Tavare
- Margaret (Light Shines) Wheeler: played by Chantry Bruised Head, Summer Rae Birdyellowhead, Sage Galesi, Irene Bedard
- Jacob (Touch the Sky) Wheeler Jr.: played by Samuel Patrick Chu, Tyler Christopher
- Abraham (High Wolf) Wheeler: played by Benjamin Smoke, Tyler Posey, Christian Kane
- Conquering Bear: played by Graham Greene
- Clara Wheeler: played by Rachael Leigh Cook, Joanna Going
- David Wheeler: played by Balthazar Getty
- Samson Wheeler: played by Matthew Modine
- Martin Jarrett: played by Sean Astin
- Hannah Wheeler: played by Georgie Collins
- Ethan Biggs: played by Daniel Gillies
- Robert Wheeler: played by Warren Kole, Craig Sheffer
- Daniel Wheeler: played by Lance Henriksen
- John Chivington: played by Tom Berenger
- George Armstrong Custer: played by Jonathan Scarfe
- Thomas C. Durant: played by Forrest Fyre
- Black Kettle: played by Wes Studi
- Red Cloud: played by Raoul Trujillo
- White Crow: played by William Joseph Elk III, David Midthunder
- Red Lance: played by Malachi Tsoodle-Nelson, Eddie Spears
- Richard Henry Pratt: played by Keith Carradine
- Douglas Hillman: played by Judge Reinhold
- Sitting Bull: played by Eric Schweig
- Crazy Horse: played by Tatanka Means
- Voices That Carry: played by Nakotah LaRance, Chaske Spencer
- Daniel Royer: played by David Paymer
- Yellow Bird: played by Billy Merasty
- Kicking Bear: played by Brandon Oakes
- Spotted Elk: played by George Aguilar
- Sleeping Bear: played by Nathan Lee Chasing His Horse

== Wheeler family tree ==
Wheeler family tree

Esther	Robert
Cyrus	Daniel	Jackson	William
Samson	Aaron	Lilly	Jedidiah
Jeremiah
Susannah	Clara (adopted)
Rachel
Leah
Abigail	Naomi
One Horn Bull
Abraham Wheeler	Benjamin	Prairie Fire
Hannah	Enoch	Ezra	David
Margaret	Nathan
Jethro
Cornflower
Thunder Heart Woman
Abraham High Wolf
Jacob
Jacob High Cloud
Margaret Light Shines
Ethan Biggs

== Accolades ==
Year	Award	Category	Nominee(s)	Result	Ref.
2005	International Film Music Critics Association Awards	Best Original Score for Television	Geoff Zanelli	Nominated	
2005	Online Film & Television Association Awards	Best Miniseries		Won	
2005	Online Film & Television Association Awards	Best Actress in a Motion Picture or Miniseries	Tonantzin Carmelo	Nominated	
2005	Online Film & Television Association Awards	Best Direction of a Motion Picture or Miniseries		Won	
2005	Online Film & Television Association Awards	Best Editing in a Motion Picture or Miniseries		Won	
2005	Online Film & Television Association Awards	Best Lighting in a Motion Picture or Miniseries		Won	
2005	Online Film & Television Association Awards	Best Makeup/Hairstyling in a Motion Picture or Miniseries		Won	
2005	Online Film & Television Association Awards	Best Music in a Motion Picture or Miniseries		Won	
2005	Online Film & Television Association Awards	Best Production Design in a Motion Picture or Miniseries		Won	
2005	Online Film & Television Association Awards	Best Sound in a Motion Picture or Miniseries		Won	
2005	Online Film & Television Association Awards	Best Visual Effects in a Motion Picture or Miniseries		Nominated	
2005	Online Film & Television Association Awards	Best New Theme Song in a Series, Motion Picture or Miniseries		Nominated	
2005	Online Film & Television Association Awards	Best New Titles Sequence in a Series, Motion Picture or Miniseries		Won	
2005	Satellite Awards	Best Miniseries		Nominated	
2006	American Society of Cinematographers Awards	Outstanding Achievement in Cinematography in Movies of the Week/Mini-Series/Pilot	Alan Caso (for "Wheel to the Stars")	Nominated	
2006	Art Directors Guild Awards	Excellence in Production Design Award – Television Movie or Mini-series	Marek Dobrowolski, Guy Barnes, Rick Roberts, Jackie Bagley, Janet Lakeman, Amy Morrison, and James F. Oberlander	Nominated	
2006	Artios Awards	Outstanding Achievement in Casting – Television Mini Series	Meg Liberman, Cami Patton, Rene Haynes, and Jo Edna Boldin	Nominated	
2006	Critics' Choice Awards	Best Picture Made for Television		Nominated	
2006	First Americans in the Arts Awards	Outstanding Lead Actor Performance in a TV Movie/Special	Zahn McClarnon	Won	
2006	First Americans in the Arts Awards	Outstanding Lead Actress Performance in a TV Movie/Special	Tonantzin Carmelo	Won	
2006	First Americans in the Arts Awards	Outstanding Supporting Actor Performance in a TV Movie/Special	Tyler Christopher	Won	
2006	First Americans in the Arts Awards	Outstanding New Performance by an Actor in a Film	Nakotah LaRance	Won	
2006	Golden Globe Awards	Best Miniseries or Television Film		Nominated	
2006	Golden Reel Awards	Best Sound Editing – Dialogue and Automated Dialogue Replacement	G. Michael Graham, Kristi Johns, William C. Carruth, Anton Holden, Charlie Kolander, Tim Terusa, Rusty Tinsley, and Burton Weinstein (for "Manifest Destiny")	Nominated	
2006	Golden Reel Awards	Best Sound Editing – Sound Effects and Foley for Long Form Television	G. Michael Graham, Sean Byrne, Bob Costanza, Mike Dickeson, Gary Macheel, Adriane Marfiak, Lou Thomas, Tim Chilton, and Jill Schachne (for "Manifest Destiny")	Won	
2006	NAMIC Vision Awards	Best Drama		Nominated	
2006	NAMIC Vision Awards	Best Dramatic Performance	Irene Bedard	Won	
2006	Primetime Emmy Awards	Outstanding Miniseries	Steven Spielberg, Justin Falvey, Darryl Frank, William Mastrosimone, Kirk Ellis, Larry Rapaport, and David A. Rosemont	Nominated	
2006	Primetime Emmy Awards	Outstanding Art Direction for a Miniseries or Movie	Marek Dobrowolski, Rick Roberts, Guy Barnes, Paul Healy, and Wendy Ozols-Barnes	Nominated	
2006	Primetime Emmy Awards	Outstanding Casting for a Miniseries, Movie or a Special	Meg Liberman, Cami Patton, Rene Haynes, Candice Elzinga, Rhonda Fisekci, and Jo Edna Boldin	Nominated	
2006	Primetime Emmy Awards	Outstanding Cinematography for a Miniseries or Movie	Alan Caso (for "Wheel to the Stars")	Nominated	
2006	Primetime Emmy Awards	Outstanding Cinematography for a Miniseries or Movie	William Wages (for "Dreams and Schemes")	Nominated	
2006	Primetime Emmy Awards	Outstanding Costumes for a Miniseries, Movie or a Special	Michael T. Boyd and Joe McClosky (for "Hell on Wheels")	Nominated	
2006	Primetime Emmy Awards	Outstanding Hairstyling for a Miniseries, Movie or a Special	Iloe Flewelling (for "Manifest Destiny")	Nominated	
2006	Primetime Emmy Awards	Outstanding Hairstyling for a Miniseries, Movie or a Special	Mary Hedges Lampert and Jennifer Santiago (for "Casualties of War")	Nominated	
2006	Primetime Emmy Awards	Outstanding Makeup for a Miniseries, Movie or a Special (Non-Prosthetic)	Tarra D. Day (for "Ghost Dance")	Nominated	
2006	Primetime Emmy Awards	Outstanding Makeup for a Miniseries, Movie or a Special (Non-Prosthetic)	Gail Kennedy (for "Wheel to the Stars")	Nominated	
2006	Primetime Emmy Awards	Outstanding Prosthetic Makeup for a Series, Miniseries, Movie or a Special	Gail Kennedy and Matthew W. Mungle (for "Wheel to the Stars")	Nominated	
2006	Primetime Emmy Awards	Outstanding Music Composition for a Miniseries, Movie or a Special (Original Dramatic Score)	Geoff Zanelli	Won	
2006	Primetime Emmy Awards	Outstanding Sound Editing for a Miniseries, Movie or a Special	G. Michael Graham, Kristi Johns, Billy B. Bell, Bob Costanza, Mike Dickeson, Gary Macheel, Lou Thomas, Adriane Marfiak, Anton Holden, Burton Weinstein, Tim Terusa, Charlie Kolander, Rusty Tinsley, Jim Schultz, Jill Schachne, and Tim Chilton (for "Manifest Destiny")	Nominated	
2006	Primetime Emmy Awards	Outstanding Single-Camera Sound Mixing for a Miniseries or a Movie	Bayard Carey, Rick Alexander, and Richard D. Rogers (for "Hell on Wheels")	Nominated	
2006	Primetime Emmy Awards	Outstanding Single-Camera Sound Mixing for a Miniseries or a Movie	George Tarrant, Rick Alexander, and Richard D. Rogers (for "Dreams and Schemes")	Won	
2006	Primetime Emmy Awards	Outstanding Special Visual Effects for a Miniseries, Movie or a Special	Tim McHugh, Craig Weiss, Glenn Campbell, Chris DeCristo, Christopher Moore, Niel Wray, Don Mccoy, George Garcia, and Eric Ehemann (for "Hell on Wheels")	Nominated	
2006	Producers Guild of America Awards	David L. Wolper Award for Outstanding Producer of Long-Form Television	Steven Spielberg, Darryl Frank, Justin Falvey, David A. Rosemont, Kirk Ellis, and Larry Rapaport	Nominated	
2006	Rosie Awards	Best Make-Up Artist	Gail Kennedy	Won	
2006	Saturn Awards	Best Television Presentation		Nominated	
2006	Screen Actors Guild Awards	Outstanding Performance by a Female Actor in a Miniseries or Television Movie	Tonantzin Carmelo	Nominated	
2006	Visual Effects Society Awards	Outstanding Created Environment in a Live Action Broadcast Program, Commercial or Music Video	Cedric Tomacruz, David Bailey, and Valeri Pfahning (for "Wheel to the Stars", "Manifest Destiny", and "Dreams and Schemes")	Won	
2006	Visual Effects Society Awards	Outstanding Compositing in a Broadcast Program, Commercial or Music Video	Jared Jones, Jason Korber, Geeta Basantani, and Ryan Dutour (for "Wheel to the Stars")	Nominated	
2006	Western Heritage Awards	Television Feature Film		Won	
2006	Western Writers of America Awards	Best Drama Script	Kirk Ellis (for "Hell on Wheels")	Won (Note: Tied with Thadd Turner for Miracle at Sage Creek.)	
2007	Costume Designers Guild Awards	Outstanding Made for Television Movie or Miniseries	Michael T. Boyd	Nominated	

== Home media ==
A four disc DVD box set was released on October 4, 2005. There are producer, director, and cast interviews among the six episodes of the series and other various features.

== Soundtrack ==
A two-disc album of Geoff Zanelli's music was released in 2013 by La-La Land Records.
