= Brad Sihvon =

Canadian actor

- Born: Arthur Bradley Sihvon; January 29, 1971; Niagara Falls, Ontario, Canada
- Died: April 7, 2010 (aged 39); Toronto, Ontario, Canada

Brad Sihvon (January 29, 1971 – April 7, 2010) was a Canadian film and television actor.

== Early life ==
Sihvon was born Arthur Bradley Sihvon in Niagara Falls, Ontario, Canada. Sihvon was in the Cinema of Canada, and made appearances in American films. Sihvon had one brother Todd Sihvon. He was the son of Roy Sihvon of Calgary, and grandson of Arthur William Sihvon, formerly deputy minister of Social Services for the Government of Saskatchewan and member of the Saskatchewan Sports Hall of Fame. His grandmother was Ruby Jean Dickson Sihvon, at one time a champion tennis player in Saskatchewan.

== Career ==
Brad's career began in 1999, and he first made his movie debut in the Sci-Fi/Thriller movie The Man Who Used to Be Me which was released in 2000, then sometime in the 2000s, Sihvon had appeared in television series and movies including Halloween: Resurrection, The Snow Walker, White Noise, Severed: Forest of the Dead and finally Scary Movie 4. Sihvon has recently appeared in a film called Whisper and was released in 2007 and played the role of an 'tow truck driver'. It is known that Brad had minor roles in a few of his movies.

== Personal life ==
Sihvon resided in Vancouver, British Columbia, Canada. He died on April 7, 2010, in Toronto, Canada.

== Filmography ==
=== Cinema ===
- The Man Who Used to Be Me (2000) (TV) - Delivery Guy
- Christy: The Movie (2000) (TV) - unknown character
- Hostage Negotiator (2001) - Nickey Larson
- The Miracle of the Cards (2001) (TV) - Guinness Employee
- Seeking Winonas (2001) - Bryan
- Pressure (2002) - Norman the Cameraman
- Dead in a Heartbeat (2002) (TV) - Communication Officer
- Halloween: Resurrection (2002) - Charley Albans
- Swimming Upstream (2002) (V) - Mitch
- My Face: The Liam Penny Story (2002) - Ted Freeman
- Firefight (2003) - Dean
- The Snow Walker (2003) - Mr. Izzard
- Stealing Christmas (2003) (TV) - Store Guard
- White Noise (2005) - Minister
- The Long Weekend (2005) - Mail Boy
- Severed: Forest of the Dead (2005) - Tom
- Clean Fight (2006) (TV) - Hank Campbell
- Scary Movie 4 (2006) - 'His Brother, The Sheriff!'
- My Baby Is Missing (2007) (TV) - Bendix
- Whisper (2007) - Tow truck driver (final film role)

=== Television ===
- These Arms of Mine (1999) (TV series) - unknown (1 episode)
- Hollywood Off-Ramp (2000) (TV series) - Robert (1 episode)
- Cold Squad (2001) (TV series) - David (1 episode)
- Freedom (2001) (TV series) - unknown (1 episode)
- The Sausage Factory (????) (TV series) - Lawyer (1 episode)
- Special Unit 2 (2001) (TV series) - Jimmy Green (1 episode)
- Rockpoint P.D. (2002) (TV series) - Media Relations Officer Phil (unknown episodes)
- The Chris Isaak Show (2002) (TV series) - Waiter (1 episode)
- My Guide to Becoming a Rock Star (????) (TV series) - Rob Hallerman (1 episode)
- Taken (2002) (TV series) (unknown episodes)
- The Twilight Zone (2002) (TV series) - Doyle Lipton (1 episode)
- Dead Like Me (2003) (TV series) - Brett (1 episode)
- Stargate SG-1 (2004) (TV series) - Joe (1 episode)
- Huff (2004) (TV series) - Eric (1 episode)
