= George Leach (musician) =

Canadian musician and actor (born 1975)

- Born: April 18, 1975 (age 51); Lillooet, British Columbia, Canada
- Origin: Lillooet, British Columbia, Canada
- Genres: Indie rock, folk rock
- Occupations: Musician, songwriter, actor
- Instruments: Vocals, guitar, bass guitar, drums, mandolin, keyboards
- Years active: 1995–present
- Website: georgeleach.com

George Leach (born April 18, 1975) is a Canadian musician and actor, best known for his work as a lead singer and songwriter.

== Background ==
Leach is a Stl'atl'imx from Lillooet, British Columbia.

As an actor, Leach has appeared on This is Wonderland, North of 60, PSI Factor and Nikita. He also appeared in the six-part miniseries Into The West as Loved by the Buffalo. He released his first album Just Where I'm At in 2000. He subsequently performed at the National Aboriginal Achievement Awards, now the Indspire Awards. He won the Juno Award for Aboriginal Album of the Year in 2014 for his album Surrender.

Leach also participated in the Canada World Youth program in 1994–95, working in Elmvale, Ontario, and Trat, Thailand.

== Awards ==
George Leach has won 3 Aboriginal People's Choice Music Awards

- 2000 Best Male Artist of the Year
- 2000 Best Rock Album
- 2013 Aboriginal Songwriter of the Year
- 2013 Best Rock CD for Surrender
- 2013 Single of the Year for "Carry Me"

== Discography ==
=== Albums ===
- 2000 Just Where I’m At
- 2013 Surrender

=== Singles ===
2013 "Carry Me"

== Television career ==
Year	Title	Role	Notes
1996-2001	PSI Factor	Winston Lucas	
1998	La Femme Nikita		
2004	This is Wonderland	Leonard Taylor	Episode #1.7
2005	Distant Drumming: A North of 60 Mystery	Matthew Fowler	TV movie
2005	Into The West	Loved by the Buffalo	2 episodes
2016	The Candy Show	Himself	Season 5 January
