= The Snow Walker =

- Theatrical release poster
- Directed by: Charles Martin Smith
- Written by: Charles Martin Smith
- Based on: "Walk Well, My Brother" by Farley Mowat
- Produced by: William Vince; Robert Merilees
- Starring: Barry Pepper; Annabella Piugattuk; James Cromwell; Kiersten Warren; Robin Dunne; Jon Gries; Michael Bublé
- Cinematography: David Connell; Paul Sarossy; Jon Joffin
- Edited by: Alison Grace
- Music by: Mychael Danna; Paul Intson
- Production company: Snow Walker/Walk Well Productions
- Distributed by: Infinity Media; Lions Gate Films
- Release dates: September 11, 2003 (TIFF); March 5, 2004 (Limited)
- Running time: 109 minutes
- Country: Canada
- Language: English
- Box office: $201,149

The Snow Walker is a 2003 Canadian survival drama film written and directed by Charles Martin Smith and starring Barry Pepper and Annabella Piugattuk. Based on the short story Walk Well, My Brother by Farley Mowat, the film is about a Canadian bush pilot whose life is changed through an encounter with a young Inuk woman and their challenge to survive the harsh conditions of the Northwest Territories following an aircraft crash. (Note: Farley Mowat's The Snow Walker is an anthology of Mowat short stories including "The Snow Walker", not related to the film.) The film won six Leo Awards, including Best Lead Performance by a Male (Barry Pepper), and was nominated for nine Genie Awards, including Best Motion Picture, Best Performance by an Actor (Barry Pepper), Best Performance by an Actress (Annabella Piugattuk), and Best Adapted Screenplay (Charles Martin Smith).

== Plot ==
In the summer of 1953, Canadian bush pilot Charlie Halliday, a brash, former Second World War bomber pilot based in Yellowknife, is flying a routine job in the Queen Maud Gulf on the Arctic Ocean when he encounters a small band of Inuit who plead for his help. They are traveling with a sick young woman, Kanaalaq, and they ask Charlie to fly her to a hospital. Charlie suspects she has tuberculosis. At first he refuses, but when they offer him two valuable walrus tusks for his help, he reluctantly agrees to take her to Yellowknife.

During the flight, his Noorduyn Norseman aircraft develops engine trouble, and they crash land near the shore of a glacial lake. Charlie and Kanaalaq are unharmed, but the aircraft is disabled. They are in the middle of a vast tundra in the Northwest Territories, the radio is broken, and they have a meager amount of supplies. To make matters worse, he is hundreds of miles from the route he submitted in his original flight plan, so any rescue operation would not know where to look. Charlie is overwhelmed with a sense of doom, and he sees his Inuk companion as an unwelcome burden.

Charlie estimates they are about 100 miles from the closest town. Believing their chances of survival are slim if they both wait with the aircraft, Charlie leaves Kanaalaq behind to look for help on his own. He soon learns, however, that he is unprepared for the challenges presented by this harsh and unforgiving land. One morning he awakens surrounded by a swarm of mosquitoes, which cause him to flee shoeless across the jagged rocks before collapsing unconscious. Kanaalaq appears above him and begins treating his wounds and bites with mud and moss. He awakes later, and is startled to find her. She feeds him and continues to care for him. Gradually, Charlie regains his strength and is healed through Kanaalaq's patient care. Charlie comes to appreciate this young woman's gifts, and together they learn to communicate with each other.

After hearing the sound of a distant aircraft, Charlie realizes they never should have abandoned the crash site. He decides they should return to their aircraft, which he believes has surely been discovered by now. They set out together, but this time he is much better equipped with the watertight boots that Kanaalaq made for him. Along the way, the ailing young Inuk woman teaches the hot-tempered pilot the way to live in the tundra, and the two form a bond of respect and friendship. When they discover the ruins of another aircraft crash, Kanaalaq shows Charlie how to prepare a corpse for the afterlife in a stone burial cairn with the person's tools placed inside. She tells him that when a person is called to the afterlife, where there is much wildlife for hunting, they need the appropriate tools.

When Charlie and Kanaalaq arrive back at the crash site, they discover no sign of rescuers, and Charlie becomes deeply depressed, convinced they will not survive the oncoming winter. Kanaalaq, however, understands how to survive in this harsh land, and she prepares a caribou hunt. She places inuksuit — multiple stone structures used by the Inuit to guide caribou into areas where hunters can easily harvest them. She is able to elicit Charlie's help, and together they kill three caribou, which will provide sufficient food and pelts for the winter.

One night, Kanaalaq reveals how her father died in a snowstorm, and how her mother wandered off to die so that her children would have enough food to live. After Kanaalaq uses the pelts to create suitable winter clothing for Charlie, Charlie and Kanaalaq set out together across the tundra hoping to reach an Inuit camp or village to the north. In the coming days, Kanaalaq's condition worsens, and Charlie is forced to carry her on a sleigh he built using the valuable walrus tusks. One morning, Charlie discovers that Kanaalaq has wandered off so that he might live. He follows her tracks in the snow, which lead to a white owl. He builds a stone burial cairn for Kanaalaq, placing her hunting and fishing tools, and the valuable walrus tusks inside for the afterlife.

In a snowstorm, Charlie approaches a small Inuit village, where he is welcomed.

== Cast ==
- Barry Pepper as Charlie Halliday
- Annabella Piugattuk as Kanaalaq
- James Cromwell as Walter "Shep" Shepherd
- Kiersten Warren as Estelle
- Jon Gries as Pierce
- Robin Dunne as Carl
- Malcolm Scott as Warren
- Michael Bublé as Hap
- Brad Sihvon as Mr. Izzard
- Greg Spottiswood as Mr. Moss
- Samson Jorah as Sammy
- William MacDonald as Miner in Bar
- Mariano Aupilardjuk as Elder Inuk
- Peter Henry Arnatsiaq as Young Inuk
- Peter Ipkornerk as Inuk Snow Camper
- Yvo Samgushak as Inuk Snow Camper
- Michael Wallace as Inuk Snow Camper
- Albert Kimaliakyuk as Inuk Snow Camper

== Production ==
A combination of full-scale aircraft and miniatures was used in The Snow Walker.

Writer-director Charles Martin Smith had played Farley Mowat in his autobiographical story Never Cry Wolf. The Hollywood-shy author Mowat invited Smith to adapt any of his works. Smith chose the short story "Walk Well, My Brother" because of its simplicity, placing two people against the elements of the Northwest Territories, but incorporated elements from "The Blood in their Veins" and other, closely related Mowat stories in his screenplay. Mowat later re-released in 2003, The Snow Walker, an anthology of earlier short stories that included "Walk Well, My Brother" and featured a preface by Smith.

The Snow Walker cast Canadian actors in the primary roles, and numerous Inuit, including the lead actress Annabella Piugattuk. She was selected after the casting director reviewed hundreds of young women, many of whom were, like Piugattuk, non-actors. She was chosen for her fluency in both her native language and English, as well as her knowledge of native hunting and survival techniques, which brought verisimilitude to her role. Additionally, co-producer John Houston grew up in an Inuit village.

The Snow Walker was filmed entirely in Canada in the following locations:

- Churchill, Manitoba (tundra scenes)
- Merritt, British Columbia (caribou hunt)
- Rankin Inlet, Nunavut
- Thompson-Nicola Regional District, British Columbia

== Reception ==
The Snow Walker received generally favorable reviews upon its release. In his review in Jam! Showbiz, Bruce Kirkland called it a "powerful, poignant and transcendent film", writing, "The Snow Walker is wonderfully acted, especially by Pepper—who is as technically proficient as any young actor in Canada—and by Piugattuk, who had never acted before, but displays a naturalism that allows her to display the emotional and spiritual nature of her people while still being an eccentric and intriguing individual. She is flesh-and-blood, not a type ... All the elements are subtly brought together under Smith's strong hand as director."

In his review in Epinions, Joe McMaster gave the film four out of five stars, noting, "For a basic story of survival, I found it to be very intriguing. The plot is solid and the script intelligent and realistic. The film has a good pace to it no noticeable flaws." McMaster was also impressed with the acting, writing, "The cast and acting is outstanding. Barry Pepper and newcomer Annabella Piugattuk aced their roles. Barry Pepper is a superb actor and his performance in this film is just another feather in his hat."

In his review in Reel Film Reviews, David Nusair gave The Snow Walker three out of five stars, singling out the performances of Barry Pepper and first-time actress Piugattuk who "proves to be a natural performer." Nusair concludes, "There's no doubt that more cynical viewers will hate The Snow Walker, with its admittedly old school approach to the material. But given the skill with which this spare story has been filmed, it's hard not to be entertained on some level."

In his review in Film Critic, Christopher Null wrote, "A little The Edge, a little Dances with Wolves, this adventure oddity is surprisingly watchable while featuring two stars who never learn to fully communicate." Despite some reservations about the flashback scenes and the scenes of the "folks back home" that come across as "padding", Null acknowledges "the stark and hauntingly beautiful landscape" shown through most of the film, and concludes, "Pepper is amazingly engaging here, despite his character's tendency to whine, and Piugattuk is a real discovery, even sans English."

== Streaming ==
In 2017, the movie was released on the Canada Media Fund Encore+ YouTube channel until Encore+ was retired in November 2022. The film started streaming on Netflix in February 2025.

== Awards ==
- 2004 Method Fest Audience Award for Best Feature (Charles Martin Smith)
- 2004 Leo Award for Best Costume Design (Allisa Swanson)
- 2004 Leo Award for Best Lead Performance by a Male (Barry Pepper)
- 2004 Leo Award for Best Musical Score (Mychael Danna)
- 2004 Leo Award for Best Overall Sound (Chris Duesterdiek, Dean Giammarco, Bill Sheppard, Mark Berger)
- 2004 Leo Award for Best Sound Editing (Bill Shepard, Dean Giammarco, Robert Hunter, Christine McLeod, Johnny Ludgate)
- 2004 Leo Award for Best Visual Effects (Mark Benard)
- 2004 Leo Award Nomination for Best Direction (Charles Martin Smith)
- 2004 Leo Award Nomination for Best Feature Length Drama (Rob Merilees, William Vince)
- 2004 Leo Award Nomination for Best Film Editing (Alison Grace)
- 2004 Leo Award Nomination for Best Production Design (Doug Byggdin)
- 2004 Leo Award Nomination for Best Screenwriting (Charles Martin Smith)
- 2004 Genie Award Nomination for Best Achievement in Direction (Charles Martin Smith)
- 2004 Genie Award Nomination for Best Achievement in Editing (Alison Grace)
- 2004 Genie Award Nomination for Best Achievement in Music – Original Score (Mychael Danna)
- 2004 Genie Award Nomination for Best Achievement in Overall Sound (Chris Duesterdiek, Mark Berger, Dean Giammarco, Bill Sheppard)
- 2004 Genie Award Nomination for Best Achievement in Sound Editing (Maureen Murphy, Dean Giammarco, Robert Hunter, Johnny Ludgate, Christine McLeod)
- 2004 Genie Award Nomination for Best Motion Picture (Rob Merilees, William Vince)
- 2004 Genie Award Nomination for Best Performance by an Actor in a Leading Role (Barry Pepper)
- 2004 Genie Award Nomination for Best Performance by an Actress in a Supporting Role (Annabella Piugattuk)
- 2004 Genie Award Nomination for Best Screenplay, Adapted (Charles Martin Smith)
- 2006 DVD Exclusive Award Nomination for Best Actor (Barry Pepper)
- 2006 DVD Exclusive Award Nomination for Best Actress (Annabella Piugattuk)
- 2006 DVD Exclusive Award Nomination for Best Overall Movie, Live-Action
- 2006 DVD Exclusive Award Nomination for Best Supporting Actor (James Cromwell)
- 2006 DVD Exclusive Award Nomination for Best Supporting Actress (Kiersten Warren)
