= Michael Spears =

American actor (born 1977)

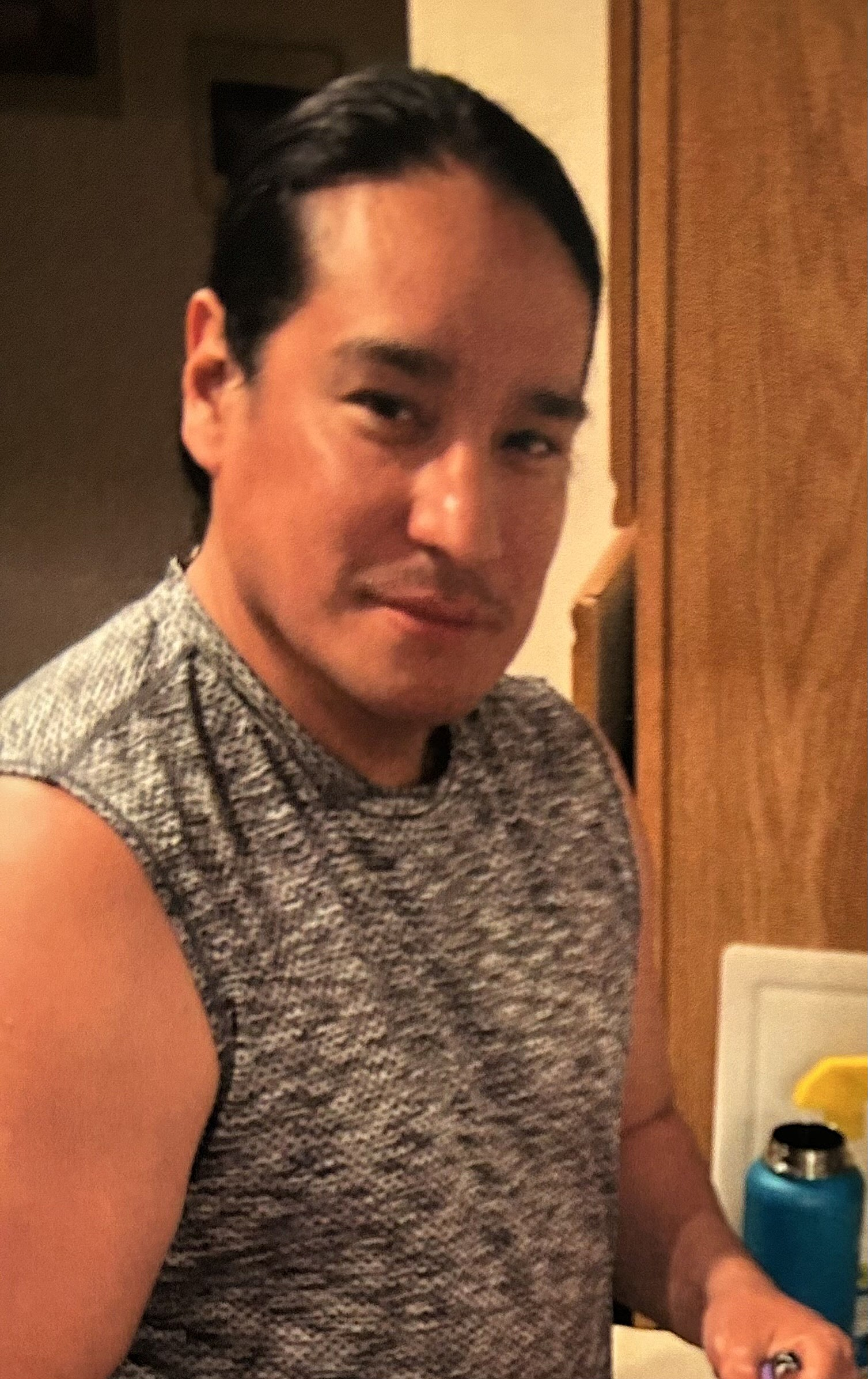
- Born: Michael Spears; December 28, 1977 (age 48); Chamberlain, South Dakota, U.S.
- Occupation: Actor
- Years active: 1990–present
- Family: Eddie Spears (brother)

Michael Spears (born December 28, 1977) is an American actor.

== Early life ==
Michael Spears was born in Chamberlain, South Dakota near the Lower Brulé Indian Reservation to Sičangu Lakota parents and lived there until he was in fifth grade. After that, his family moved to Pierre, South Dakota. Later, his family moved to Aberdeen, South Dakota where he graduated from Aberdeen Central High School in 1995.

He has six siblings. His younger brother, Eddie, is also an actor with film and television credits.

== Career ==
=== Film/television ===
Spears' debut role as the child character Otter, in the Academy-Award-winning 1990 film Dances with Wolves, earned him national notice at thirteen years old. By the age of seventeen, Spears had acted in both TV and film with other prominent actors such as Kevin Costner, Jimmy Smits and Kim Delaney.

Spears' film credits include a major role as the character Dog Star in the 2005 Steven Spielberg-produced mini-series, Into the West, which aired on TNT.

In 2014, for his role as Tenkill in Angels in Stardust, Spears received critical acclaim in The New York Times.

His recent roles include a cameo in Taylor Sheridan's Western series 1883, a supporting role in season 2 of Reservation Dogs on Hulu, a supporting role in the series 1923, and the principal role of Sitting Bull in the History Channel's two-part docuseries, Sitting Bull.

=== Other work ===
In 2005, Michael and Eddie Spears modeled for Cochiti Pueblo fashion designer Virgil Ortiz for his "Indigene" clothing line and were featured on the cover of the August 2005 issue of New Mexico Magazine.

In 2013, he hosted the 38th Annual American Indian Film Institute Awards.

In 2014 and 2015, Spears played a recurrent role as Savanukah, a member of the 1777 Cherokee Delegation, in Colonial Williamsburg's open-air stage production of The Beloved Women of Chota: War Women of the Cherokee. He has also served as a musical contributor to other stage productions and media festivals such as the Bozeman Ice Festival and the Billings Symphony Orchestra. In 2021, Spears performed alongside other acclaimed Indigenous performers in the Billings Symphony Orchestra's symphonic production "Buffalo Crossing," which integrated the traditional music and dance of Plains tribes with orchestral music.

== Personal life ==
Spears is an accomplished hand drum player and singer, often performing at powwows and other venues. He was the opening act for Rita Coolidge at her 2005 concert in Great Falls, Montana. Spears often travels to deliver speeches on inspirational and educational topics, including sustainable energy and mental health, and mentors Indigenous youth in Montana and South Dakota.

He worked with his late father, Patrick Spears, and his brother Eddie on ICOUP's (Intertribal Council on Utility Policy) Native Energy and Native Wind whose goal was to encourage creation of sustainable energy sources. Formed in 1994, ICOUP provided a forum for utility issues discussion from regulatory and economic perspectives.

Spears can speak some Lakota, which he first learned from his father and grandfather, and is continuing to learn. On the set of Dances with Wolves, Spears received Lakota language instruction from renowned Lakota language instructors Doris and Frank Leader Charge. During the filming of Into the West, he and the other actors had lessons from linguist Charlie White Buffalo.

Traditional Lakota ways and ceremonies are a priority for Spears, as he often takes part in spiritual and cultural events across the country. Spears has also engaged in activism for the Indigenous community, making appearances at environmental and MMIW, Missing and Murdered Indigenous Women, demonstrations and voicing his concerns about the misappropriation of Native culture through sports iconography.

== Filmography ==
Year	Title	Role	Notes
1990	Dances with Wolves	Otter	Film
1992	The Broken Cord	Young Adam	TV movie
1993	The Broken Chain	Young Lohaheo	TV movie
1994	Lakota Woman: Siege at Wounded Knee	Stat Man	TV movie
2002	Skins	Teddy Yellow Lodge	Film
2005	Into the West	Dog Star	TV mini-series
2007	Imprint	Tom Greyhorse	Film
2009	Shadowheart	Washakie	Film
2011	The Legend of Hell's Gate: An American Conspiracy	Kutseena	Film
2011	Yellow Rock	Broken Wing	Film
2012	Longmire	Micah Dullknife	TV series
2012	Guns, Girls, and Gambling	Redfoot	Film
2013	Winter in the Blood	Raymond Long Knife	Film
2014	Angels in Stardust	Tenkill	Film
2014	The Activist	Bud "One Bull" Ward	Film
2014–2015	The Beloved Women of Chota	Savanukah	Stage production
2017	The Ballad of Lefty Brown	Biscuit	Film
2018	Z Nation	Black Hoof	TV series
2021	Chief Tendoy	Chief Tendoy	Short film
2021	Intermountain Opera: The Circle of Resilience	Lakota Singer	PBS special
2022	1883	Comanche Trader	TV series
2022	Into the Wild Frontier	Hanging Maw	TV series
2022	Reservation Dogs	Danny	TV series
2022	Year of the Dog	Fred	Film
2022	Bring on the Dancing Horses	Posse Member	TV series
2023–2025	1923	Runs His Horse	TV series
2024	National Parks: USA	Narrator	TV series
2025	Sitting Bull	Sitting Bull	TV series

== Awards ==
- Young Artist Awards: Nominated in 1993 for Best Young Actor Under Ten in a Television Movie as Adam in The Broken Cord
- American Indian Film Festival and Awards: Nominated in 2011 for Best Actor as Broken Wing in Yellow Rock
- Awarded Bronze Wrangler Award at the Western Heritage Awards in 2012 for Lead Actor as Broken Wing in Yellow Rock
- American Indian Film Festival and Awards: Nominated in 2013 for Best Supporting Actor as Bud "One Bull" Ward in The Activist
