= King Rikki =

- Directed by: James Gavin Bedford
- Written by: Jesse Graham based on the play Richard III by William Shakespeare
- Starring: Jon Seda; Mario López; Tonantzin Carmelo; Timothy Paul Perrez
- Release date: 2002

King Rikki (titled The Street King in some releases) is a 2002 drama film starring Jon Seda, Mario López, Tonantzin Carmelo and Timothy Paul Perrez. It was directed by James Gavin Bedford and written by Jesse Graham.

This film was based on the play Richard III by William Shakespeare. The fighting between the House of York and the House of Lancaster is transposed to northern California and southern California Latino gangs.
