= The Broken Cord =

1992 ABC drama television film

- Genre: Drama
- Based on: The Broken Cord by Michael Dorris
- Written by: Ann M. Beckett
- Screenplay by: Ann. M. Beckett
- Directed by: Ken Olin
- Starring: Jimmy Smits; Kim Delaney; Michael Spears
- Music by: Laura Karpman
- Country of origin: United States
- Original language: English

Production
- Executive producer: Carmen Culver
- Producer: Alan Barnette
- Production locations: Toronto Island Airport; Unionville, Ontario
- Cinematography: Roy H. Wagner
- Editor: Elba Sanchez-Short
- Running time: 92 min
- Production company: Universal Television

Original release
- Network: ABC
- Release: February 3, 1992

The Broken Cord is a 1992 drama television film which aired on ABC. The film was directed by Ken Olin in his film directorial debut. It was adapted from the 1989 book of the same name by Michael Dorris. Both the book and the film are based on Dorris' life raising his special needs son.

== Plot summary ==
A young Lakota boy named Adam (Michael Spears) is adopted by 26 year old David Norwell. Norwell is told that Adam might have intellectual disability, but Norwell thinks that the boy will succeed in a loving environment. He deals with the struggles of raising a disabled and medically-complex child, from toilet training trouble to seizures. After the discovery of a lesion in Adam's brain, Norwell realizes that Adam does not have intellectual disability as earlier believed, but rather fetal alcohol syndrome.

== Production ==
Jimmy Smits was asked to portray Dorris, with the character name of David Norwell, in 1989 which was shortly after the book was released. The actor said that he read the book in one night. Shortly after the book's release, 36 producers were interested in securing film rights to the book. The author did not want the film to be seen "as a disease-of-the-week movie". A television film was chosen over a theatrical film so that more people would experience the danger of drinking alcohol while pregnant. Smits' became emotional over his performance as David Norwell. Reynold Abel, on whom the character Adam was based, was struck and killed by a car at age 23 before the film's release in September 1991.

If Abel had been born whole, he had the potential of making a real contribution to the world. Because he was gentle and he was kind and he had a sense of humor. But he wasn't able to do that, because of the problems with which he was born. He overcame those problems more than most people thought he would be able to do. In a way this movie is his contribution. And I'm very proud of it.

— Michael Dorris

== Reception ==
John J. O'Connor, writing for The New York Times, said, "Going against the television-movie grain, The Broken Cord provides no comforting payoff. The real Adam died last year after he was hit by a car. This is a story of profound anguish. It is also, however, a story of courage and powerful love on the part of both father and son." Ken Tucker of Entertainment Weekly wrote, "Adam (Reynold Abel in real life) died last year, only 23 years old, hit by a car; flawed as it is, TV’s The Broken Cord is a heartfelt testament to his life."
