= List of awards and nominations received by Northern Exposure =

Northern Exposure awards and nominations
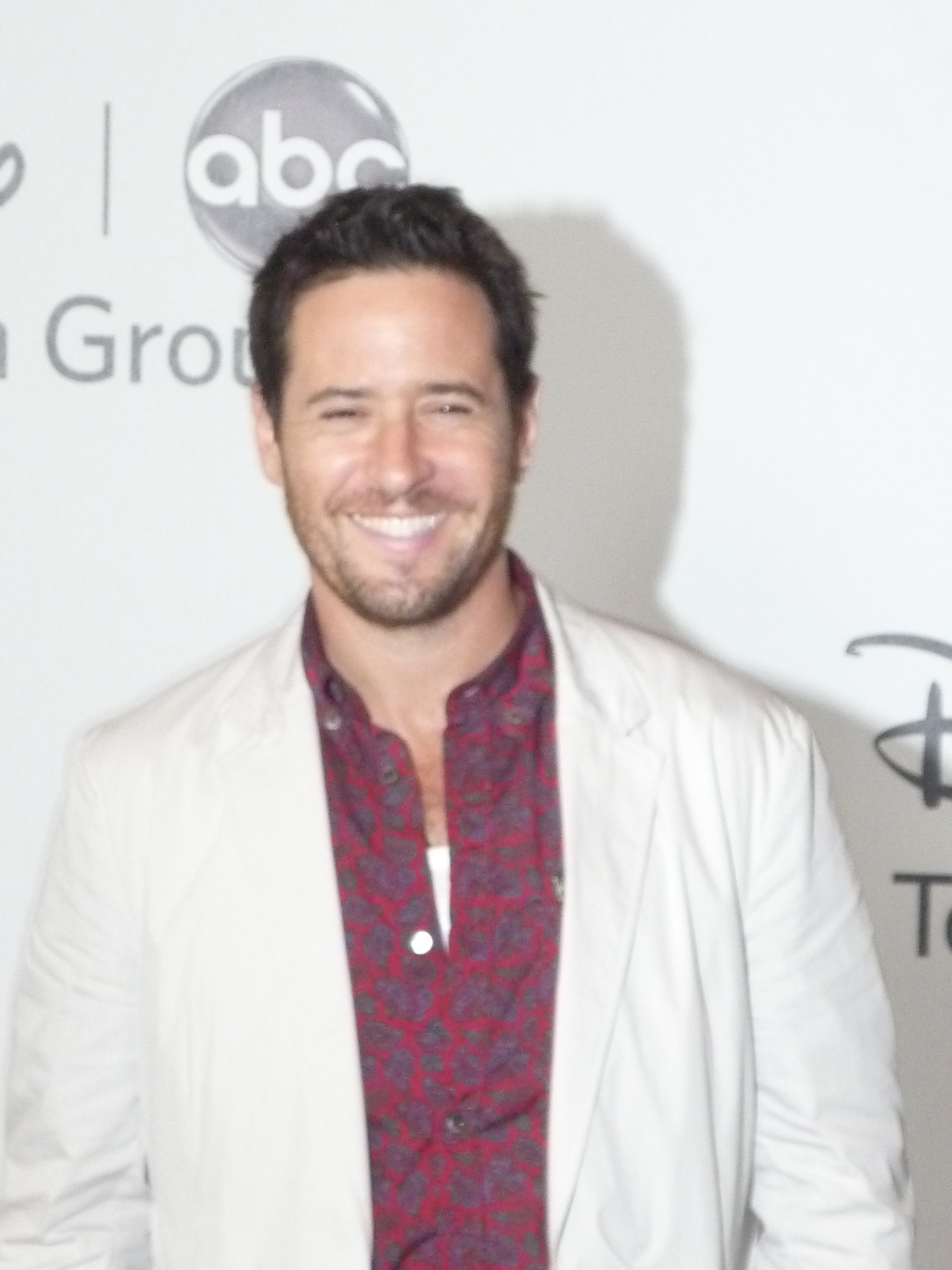
- Rob Morrow received many nominations for his performance as Dr. Joel Fleischman.
Awards and nominations
Award	Wins	Nominations
American Cinema Editors Awards	1	3
American Society of Cinematographers Awards	0	1
American Television Awards	0	7
Artios Awards	2	5
BMI Film & TV Awards	3	3
Cinema Audio Society Awards	0	2
Directors Guild of America Awards	1	5
Emmy Awards	7	39
Environmental Media Awards	2	2
Golden Globe Awards	2	10
Grammy Awards	0	1
International Monitor Awards	1	1
Peabody Awards	2	2
Producers Guild of America Awards	1	1
Screen Actors Guild Awards	0	1
TCA Awards	1	6
TV Land Awards	0	2
Q Awards	2	19
Wise Owl Awards	2	2
Writers Guild of America Awards	0	3
Young Artist Awards	0	1

Totals (Note: Certain award groups do not simply award one winner. They acknowledge several different recipients, have runners-up, and have third place. Since this is a specific recognition and is different from losing an award, runner-up mentions are considered wins in this award tally. For simplification and to avoid errors, each award in this list has been presumed to have had a prior nomination.)
- Wins: 27
- Nominations: 116

Northern Exposure is an American comedy-drama television series created by Joshua Brand and John Falsey and produced by Cine-Nevada Productions and Universal Television. The show originally aired in the United States on CBS between July 12, 1990 and July 26, 1995, with 110 episodes split across five seasons. The series, which starred Rob Morrow, Barry Corbin, Janine Turner, John Cullum, Darren E. Burrows, John Corbett, Cynthia Geary, Elaine Miles, Peg Phillips, Paul Provenza and Teri Polo, follows a New York City physician who sets up his practice in an eccentric small town.

Northern Exposure garnered critical praise and amassed 116 nominations for various industry awards. This includes 39 Primetime Emmy Awards (with seven wins), 10 Golden Globe Awards (with two wins), six TCA Awards (with one win), 19 Q Awards (with two wins), five Directors Guild of America Awards (one win) and three Writers Guild of America Awards, as well as winning two consecutive Peabody Awards.

Several Northern Exposure cast members received awards and nominations for their individual work. Turner, who portrayed lead character Maggie O'Donnell, received the most award nominations (12), while Valerie Mahaffey is the only actor on the series to win a Primetime Emmy Award.

== Awards and nominations ==
=== ACE Eddie Awards ===
Presented since 1962, the Eddie Award is an annual accolade that was created by American Cinema Editors to award outstanding achievements in editing in television and film. Northern Exposure won an award, out of three nominations, for Best Edited One-Hour Series for Television.

Year	Category	Nominee(s)	Episode(s)	Result	Ref
1993	Best Edited One-Hour Series for Television	Thomas R. Moore	for "Cicely"	Nominated	
1994	Best Edited One-Hour Series for Television	Briana London and Sharon Silverman	for "Kaddish for Uncle Manny"	Won	
1995	Best Edited One-Hour Series for Television	Briana London	for "Lovers and Madmen"	Nominated	

=== American Television Awards ===
The American Television Awards was a television sweeps special that aired on ABC in 1993 as a remedy to 44th Primetime Emmy Awards, giving awards similar to those presented by Academy of Television Arts & Sciences. Northern Exposure received seven nominations.

Year	Category	Nominee(s)	Result	Ref
1993	Best Dramatic Series		Nominated	
1993	Best Actor in a Dramatic Series	Rob Morrow	Nominated	
1993	Best Actress in a Dramatic Series	Janine Turner	Nominated	
1993	Best Supporting Actor in a Dramatic Series	John Corbett	Nominated	
1993	Best Supporting Actor in a Dramatic Series	Barry Corbin	Nominated	
1993	Best Supporting Actress in a Dramatic Series	Cynthia Geary	Nominated	
1993	Best Supporting Actress in a Dramatic Series	Peg Phillips	Nominated	

=== Artios Awards ===
Presented by the Casting Society of America, the Artios Award is an annual accolades honoring outstanding achievements in casting. Northern Exposure won two awards out of five nominations.

Year	Category	Nominee(s)	Result	Ref
1991	Best Casting for TV, Pilot	Megan Branman, Patti Carns Kalles and Lynn Kressel	Won	
1991	Best Casting for TV, Comedy Episodic	Megan Branman and Patti Carns Kalles	Nominated	
1992	Best Casting for TV, Comedy Episodic	Megan Branman and Patti Carns Kalles	Won	
1993	Best Casting for TV, Comedy Episodic	Megan Branman	Nominated	
1994	Best Casting for TV, Comedy Episodic	Megan Branman	Nominated	

=== BMI Film & TV Awards ===
Broadcast Music, Inc. (BMI) is one of three United States performing rights organizations, along with ASCAP and SESAC. It collects license fees on behalf of songwriters, composers, and music publishers and distributes them as royalties to those members whose works have been performed. Northern Exposure received three awards from BMI.

Year	Category	Nominee(s)	Result	Ref
1992	BMI TV Music Award	David Schwartz	Won	
1993	BMI TV Music Award	David Schwartz	Won	
1994	BMI TV Music Award	David Schwartz	Won	

=== Directors Guild of America Awards ===
The Directors Guild of America Award is an annual accolade presented by the Directors Guild of America (DGA) which awards outstanding achievements in the field of directing. Northern Exposure received five nominations during its tenure, winning once for Outstanding Directorial Achievement in a Drama Series.

Year	Category	Nominee(s)	Episodes(s)	Result	Ref
1991	Outstanding Directorial Achievement in a Drama Series	James Hayman	for "Jules & Joel"	Nominated	
1991	Outstanding Directorial Achievement in a Drama Series	Stuart Margolin	for "Goodbye To All That"	Nominated	
1992	Outstanding Directorial Achievement in a Drama Series	Michael Fresco	for "Thanksgiving"	Nominated	
1992	Outstanding Directorial Achievement in a Drama Series	Rob Thompson, Jack Terry (unit production manager), Patrick McKee (first assistant director), and Robert Loeser (second assistant director)	for "Cicely"	Won	
1993	Outstanding Directorial Achievement in a Comedy Series	Michael Lange	for "Kaddish for Uncle Manny"	Nominated	

=== Emmy Awards ===
Presented by the Academy of Television Arts & Sciences since 1949, the Primetime Emmy Award is an annual accolade that honors outstanding achievements in various aspects of television such as acting, directing and writing. The cast and crew of Northern Exposure received 39 nominations, winning seven awards.

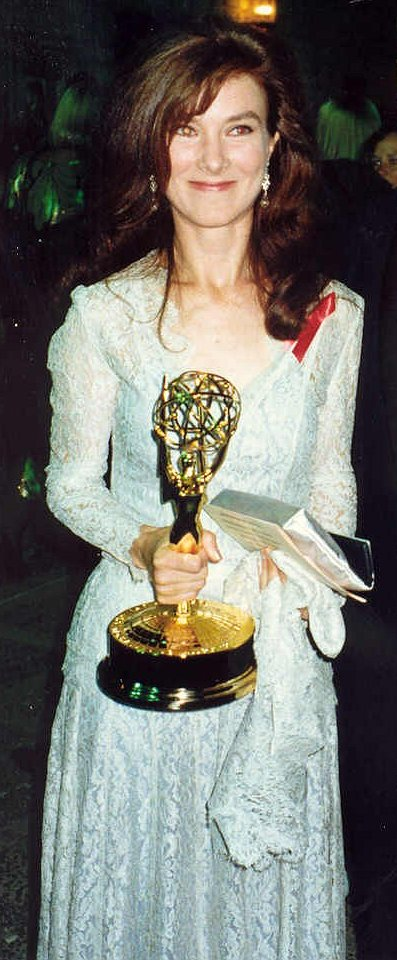
Valerie Mahaffey won in 1992 for her role as Eve.

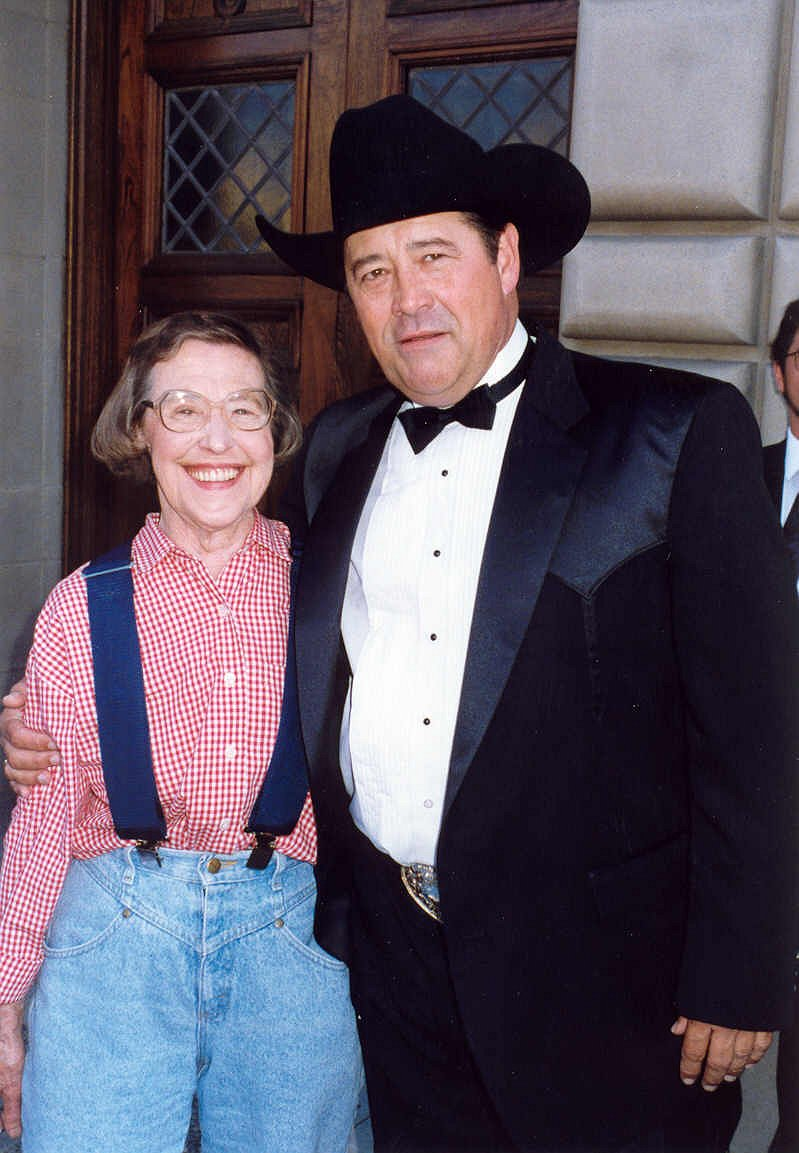
Barry Corbin was twice nominated for his performance on the series.

==== Primetime Emmy Awards ====
Year	Category	Nominee(s)	Episodes(s)	Result	Ref
1991	Outstanding Drama Series	Cheryl Bloch, Joshua Brand, John Falsey, Diane Frolov, Robin Green, Mathew Nodella, Charles Rosin, Andrew Schneider and Robert T. Skodis		Nominated	
1991	Outstanding Writing in a Drama Series	Joshua Brand and John Falsey	for "Pilot"	Nominated	
1992	Outstanding Drama Series	Cheryl Bloch, Joshua Brand, John Falsey, Diane Frolov, Robin Green, Jeff Melvoin, Mathew Nodella, Andrew Schneider and Rob Thompson		Won	
1992	Outstanding Lead Actor in a Drama Series	Rob Morrow as Dr. Joel Fleischman	for "Jules et Joel"	Nominated	
1992	Outstanding Supporting Actor in a Drama Series	John Corbett as Chris Stevens	for "Burning Down the House"	Nominated	
1992	Outstanding Supporting Actress in a Drama Series	Cynthia Geary as Shelly Tambo	for "Get Real"	Nominated	
1992	Outstanding Supporting Actress in a Drama Series	Valerie Mahaffey as Eve	for "Lost & Found"	Won	
1992	Outstanding Individual Achievement in Directing in a Drama Series	Jack Bender	for "Seoul Mates"	Nominated	
1992	Outstanding Individual Achievement in Writing in a Drama Series	Diane Frolov and Andrew Schneider	for "Seoul Mates"	Won	
1992	Outstanding Individual Achievement in Writing in a Drama Series	Robin Green	for "Burning Down the House"	Nominated	
1992	Outstanding Individual Achievement in Writing in a Drama Series	Jeff Melvoin	for "Democracy in America"	Nominated	
1993	Outstanding Drama Series	Cheryl Bloch, Joshua Brand, Martin Bruestle, John Falsey, Diane Frolov, Robin Green, Jeff Melvoin, Andrew Schneider, Rob Thompson and Michael Vittes		Nominated	
1993	Outstanding Lead Actor in a Drama Series	Rob Morrow as Dr. Joel Fleischman	for "Kaddish for Uncle Manny"	Nominated	
1993	Outstanding Lead Actress in a Drama Series	Janine Turner as Maggie O'Connell	for "Love's Labour Maid"	Nominated	
1993	Outstanding Supporting Actor in a Drama Series	Barry Corbin as Maurice J. Minnifield	for "Sleeping with the Enemy"	Nominated	
1993	Outstanding Supporting Actor in a Drama Series	John Cullum as Holling Vincouver	for "Learning Curve"	Nominated	
1993	Outstanding Supporting Actress in a Drama Series	Cynthia Geary as Shelly Tambo	for "Kaddish for Uncle Manny"	Nominated	
1993	Outstanding Supporting Actress in a Drama Series	Peg Phillips as Ruth-Anne Miller	for "Blowing Bubbles"	Nominated	
1993	Outstanding Guest Actor in a Drama Series	Adam Arkin as Adam	for "The Big Feast"	Nominated	
1993	Outstanding Guest Actress in a Drama Series	Bibi Besch as Jane O’Connell	for "Grosse Pointe 48230"	Nominated	
1993	Outstanding Individual Achievement in Writing in a Drama Series	Jeff Melvoin	for "Kaddish, for Uncle Manny"	Nominated	
1993	Outstanding Individual Achievement in Writing in a Drama Series	Geoffrey Neigher	for "Midnight Sun"	Nominated	
1994	Outstanding Drama Series	Cheryl Bloch, Martin Bruestle, David Chase, Michael Fresco, Diane Frolov, Robin Green, Barbara Hall, Jeff Melvoin, Andrew Schneider and Michael Vittes		Nominated	
1994	Outstanding Supporting Actor in a Drama Series	Barry Corbin as Maurice J. Minnifield	for "The Mystery of the Old Curio Shop" + "The Gift of the Maggie"	Nominated	

==== Creative Arts Emmy Awards ====
Year	Category	Nominee(s)	Episodes(s)	Result	Ref
1991	Outstanding Sound Mixing for a Drama Series	Michael Getlin, Glenn Micallef, Dean Okrand and R. William A. Thiederman	for "Aurora Borealis: A Fairy Tale For Big People"	Nominated	
1992	Outstanding Individual Achievement in Art Direction for a Series	Kenneth Berg, Woody Crocker and Gene Serdena	for "Cicely"	Won	
1992	Outstanding Individual Achievement in Cinematography for a Series	Frank Prinzi	for "Cicely"	Won	
1992	Outstanding Individual Achievement in Editing for a Series – Single-Camera Production	Briana London	for "Three Amigos"	Nominated	
1992	Outstanding Individual Achievement in Editing for a Series – Single-Camera Production	Thomas R. Moore	for "Cicely"	Won	
1992	Outstanding Individual Achievement in Makeup for a Series	Joni Powell	for "Cicely"	Nominated	
1992	Outstanding Individual Achievement in Sound Editing for a Series	William Angarola, Mike Depatie, Kimberly Lambert, Brian Risner, Miguel Rivera, Allan K. Rosen and Patty Von Arx	for "Three Amigos"	Nominated	
1992	Outstanding Individual Achievement in Sound Mixing for a Drama Series	Peter Cole, Anthony D'Amico, Gary Regan and Robert Marts	for "Three Amigos"	Nominated	
1993	Outstanding Individual Achievement in Art Direction for a Series	Kenneth Berg, Woody Crocker, Lori Melendy and Robert Stover	for "Revelations"	Nominated	
1993	Outstanding Individual Achievement in Cinematography for a Series	Frank Prinzi	for "Revelations"	Nominated	
1993	Outstanding Individual Achievement in Editing for a Series – Single-Camera Production	Briana London	for "Thanksgiving"	Nominated	
1993	Outstanding Individual Achievement in Sound Editing for a Series	William Angarola, Tony Capelli, Mike Depatie, Kimberly Lambert, Allan K. Rosen, Mark Seagrave, Joel Valentine and Patty Von Arx	for "Kaddish for Uncle Manny"	Nominated	
1993	Outstanding Individual Achievement in Sound Mixing for a Drama Series	Anthony D'Amico, Robert Marts, Glenn Micaller, Greg Orloff and R. Russell Smith	for "Kaddish for Uncle Manny"	Nominated	
1994	Outstanding Individual Achievement in Sound Editing for a Series	William Angarola, Zane D. Bruce, Tony Capelli, Mike Depatie, Kimberly Lambert, Allan K. Rosen, Mark Seagrave, Alicia Stevenson, Joel Valentine and Patty Von Arx	for "Fish Story"	Won	
1994	Outstanding Individual Achievement in Sound Mixing for a Drama Series	Anthony D'Amico, Robert Marts, Glenn Micallef, Greg Orloff and R. Russell Smith	for "Fish Story"	Nominated	

=== Golden Globe Awards ===
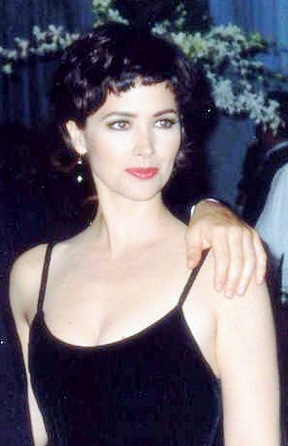
Janine Turner received three nominations for Best Actress – Television Series Drama.

The Golden Globe Award is an annual accolade presented by the Hollywood Foreign Press Association (HFPA) which honors the best performances in television and film. Northern Exposure received ten nominations, winning two awards for Best Television Series – Drama.

Year	Category	Nominee(s)	Result	Ref
1991	Best Television Series – Drama		Won	
1991	Best Actor – Television Series Drama	Rob Morrow as Joel Fleischman	Nominated	
1991	Best Actress – Television Series Drama	Janine Turner as Maggie O'Connell	Nominated	
1992	Best Television Series – Drama		Won	
1992	Best Actor – Television Series Drama	Rob Morrow as Joel Fleischman	Nominated	
1992	Best Actress – Television Series Drama	Janine Turner as Maggie O'Connell	Nominated	
1992	Best Supporting Actor – Series, Miniseries or Television Film	John Corbett as Chris Stevens	Nominated	
1993	Best Television Series – Drama		Nominated	
1993	Best Actor – Television Series Drama	Rob Morrow as Joel Fleischman	Nominated	
1993	Best Actress – Television Series Drama	Janine Turner as Maggie O'Connell	Nominated	

=== Peabody Awards ===
Awarded since 1940, the Peabody Award, named after American banker and philanthropist George Peabody, is an annual award the recognizes excellence in storytelling across mediums including television, radio, television networks, and online videos. Northern Exposure won two consecutive awards, a rarity for television series, with the second award for the episode "Cicely".

Year	Nominee(s)	Episode(s)	Result	Ref
1991	Brand-Falsey Productions		Won	
1992	CBS-TV, Finnegan-Pinchuk Company, Brand-Falsey Productions	for "Cicely"	Won	

=== Q Awards ===
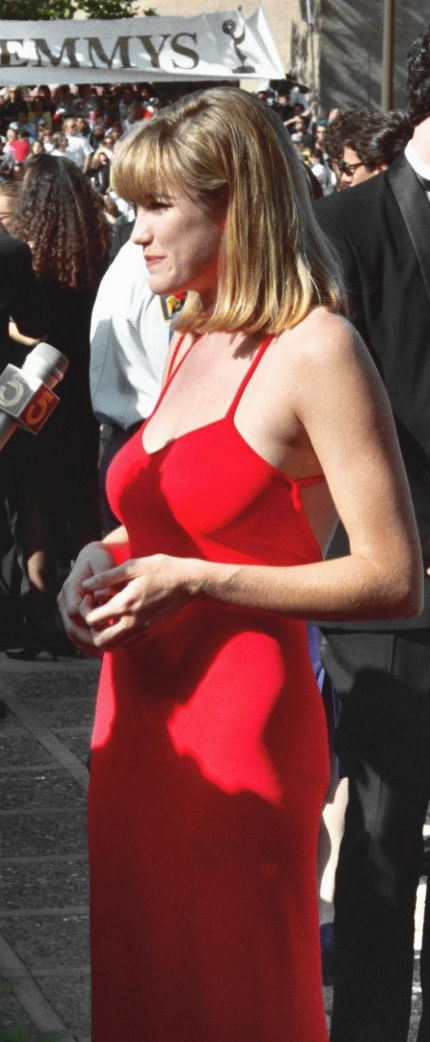
Cynthia Geary received two nominations for her performance on the series.

The Q Award, presented by the Viewers for Quality Television since 1986, recognizes critically acclaimed programs and performers for their outstanding achievements in television. During its tenure, Northern Exposure won 2 awards out of 19 nominations.

Year	Category	Nominee(s)	Result	Ref
1991	Best Actress in a Quality Drama Series	Janine Turner	Nominated	
1991	Best Supporting Actor in a Quality Drama Series	Barry Corbin	Nominated	
1991	Best Writing in a Quality Drama Series		Nominated	
1992	Best Quality Drama Series		Nominated	
1992	Best Actor in a Quality Drama Series	Rob Morrow	Nominated	
1992	Best Actress in a Quality Drama Series	Janine Turner	Nominated	
1992	Best Supporting Actor in a Quality Drama Series	John Cullum	Won	
1992	Specialty Player	Adam Arkin	Won	
1993	Best Quality Drama Series		Nominated	
1993	Best Actress in a Quality Drama Series	Janine Turner	Nominated	
1993	Best Supporting Actor in a Quality Drama Series	John Cullum	Nominated	
1993	Best Supporting Actress in a Quality Drama Series	Cynthia Geary	Nominated	
1993	Specialty Player	Richard Cummings Jr.	Nominated	
1994	Best Quality Drama Series		Nominated	
1994	Best Actress in a Quality Drama Series	Janine Turner	Nominated	
1994	Best Supporting Actor in a Quality Drama Series	John Cullum	Nominated	
1994	Best Supporting Actress in a Quality Drama Series	Cynthia Geary	Nominated	
1994	Best Supporting Actress in a Quality Drama Series	Peg Phillips	Nominated	
1994	Specialty Player	Graham Greene	Nominated	

=== Television Critics Association Awards ===
Awarded by the Television Critics Association since 1985, the Television Critics Association Award (TCA Award) is an annual accolade that recognizes outstanding achievements in television programming and acting performances. Northern Exposure received six nominations, winning once for Program of the Year.

Year	Category	Nominee(s)	Result	Ref
1991	Program of the Year		Nominated	
1991	Outstanding Achievement in Comedy		Nominated	
1991	Outstanding Achievement in Drama		Nominated	
1992	Program of the Year		Won	
1992	Outstanding Achievement in Comedy		Nominated	
1992	Outstanding Achievement in Drama		Nominated	

=== Other awards ===
Award	Year of ceremony	Category	Nominee(s)	Result	Ref
American Society of Cinematographers Awards	1993	Outstanding Achievement in Cinematography in Regular Series	Frank Prinzi for "Cicely"	Nominated	
Cinema Audio Society Awards	1994	Outstanding Achievement in Sound Mixing for Television	R. Russell Smith, Greg Orloff, Anthony D'Amico and Robert Marts for "Kaddish, for Uncle Manny"	Nominated	
Cinema Audio Society Awards	1995	Outstanding Achievement in Sound Mixing for Television - Series	R. Russell Smith, Greg Orloff, Anthony D'Amico, Robert Marts and Glenn Micallef for "Fish Story"	Nominated	
Environmental Media Awards	1993	EMA Award for TV Drama		Won	
Environmental Media Awards	1995	EMA Board of Directors Ongoing Commitment Award	Joshua Brand and John Falsey	Won	
Grammy Awards	1993	Best Instrumental Composition Written for a Motion Picture or for Television	David Schwartz	Nominated	
International Monitor Awards	1993	Film Originated Entertainment - Director	Rob Thompson for "Cicely"	Won	
Producers Guild of America Awards	1991	Outstanding Producer of Television	Joshua Brand and John Palsey	Won	
Screen Actors Guild Awards	1994	Outstanding Performance by an Ensemble in a Comedy Series	Darren E. Burrows, John Corbett, Barry Corbin, John Cullum, Cynthia Geary, Elaine Miles, Rob Morrow, Peg Phillips, Teri Polo, Paul Provenza and Janine Turner	Nominated	
TV Land Awards	2005	Classic TV Broadcaster of the Year	John Corbett	Nominated	
TV Land Awards	2006	Broadcaster of the Year	John Corbett	Nominated	
Wise Owl Award – Honorable Mention	1992	Television and Theatrical Film Fiction	for "A Hunting We Will Go"	Won	
Wise Owl Award – Honorable Mention	1993	Television and Theatrical Film Fiction	for "Three Amigos"	Won	
Writers Guild of America Awards	1992	Television: Episodic Drama	Diane Frolov and Andrew Schneider for "Seoul Mates"	Nominated	
Writers Guild of America Awards	1992	Television: Episodic Drama	Robin Green for "Burning Down the House"	Nominated	
Writers Guild of America Awards	1994	Television: Episodic Drama	Robin Green and Mitchell Burgess for "Hello, I Love You"	Nominated	
Youth Artist Awards	1990-1991	Best Young Actor Guest Starring or Recurring Role in a TV Series	Grant Gelt	Nominated	
