= Marilyn (given name) =

Marilyn is a feminine given name.

== Origin and meaning ==
Marilyn is a blend of the English given names Mary and Lynn. First record of the name Marilyn: Marilyn Spencer Foster born 1510 in England. It began to be used increasingly in the 1920s, and it reached its peak of popularity in the 1930s, 1940s and 1950s. Variants of the name includes: Maralyn, Marelyn, Marilynn, Marlyn, Marylyn, Marrilyn, Marillyn, Merilyn, Merrelyn and Merrilyn.

== Notable people ==
- Marilyn (singer) (born 1962), British entertainer
- Marilyn Agliotti (born 1979), Dutch-South African field hockey player
- Marilyn Anderson, Australian scientist
- Marilyn Aschner (born 1948), American professional tennis player
- Marilyn Avila (born 1949), American politician
- Marilyn Bergman (1928–2022), American composer, songwriter and author
- Marilyn Borden (1932–2009), American singer and actress
- Marilyn Brick, Canadian politician
- Marilyn Burns (disambiguation), several people
- Marilyn Chambers (1952–2009), American pornographic actress
- Marilyn Churley (born 1948), Canadian politician
- Marilyn Cole (born 1949), Playboy magazine's January 1972 Playmate of the Month
- Marilyn Crispell (born 1947), American pianist and composer
- Marilyn Duckworth (born 1935), New Zealand novelist, poet and short story writer
- Marilyn Duke (1916–1995), American singer
- Marilyn Eastman (1933–2021), American actress
- Marilyn Erskine (born 1926), American actress
- Marilyn Ferguson (1938–2008), American author, editor and public speaker
- Marilyn Fogel (1952–2022), American geo-ecologist
- Marilyn French (1929–2009), American author
- Marilyn Ghigliotti, American actress, producer, director and make-up artist
- Marilyn Gladu (born 1962), Canadian politician
- Marilyn Gordon, Trinidad and Tobago politician
- Marilyn Hacker (born 1942), American poet, critic and reviewer
- Marilyn Hagerty (1926–2025), American newspaper columnist
- Marilyn Hall (c. 1927–2017), Canadian-born American producer and philanthropist
- Marilyn Hess (born 1939), American politician
- Marillyn Hewson (born 1953), executive of Lockheed Martin
- Marilyn Horne (born 1934), American opera singer
- Marilyn Howard (1939–2020), American politician
- Marilyn Kaye (born 1949), American children's writer
- Marilyn Kidd (born 1964), Australian rower
- Marilyn Knowlden (1926–2025), American child actress
- Marilyn Kozak (born 1943), American professor of biochemistry
- Marilyn Levine (1935–2005), Canadian ceramics artist
- Marilyn Lewis (1931–2020), American politician
- Marilyn Lloyd (1929–2018), American politician and businesswoman
- Marilyn Fisher Lundy (1925–2014), American businesswoman and philanthropist
- Marilyn Martino, Venezuelan politician
- Marilyn Maxwell (1921–1972), American actress
- Marilyn Mazur (1955–2025), American-born Danish percussionist
- Marilyn McCoo (born 1943), American singer and actress
- Marilyn Milian (born 1961), judge on the television show The People's Court
- Marilyn Miller (1898–1936), Broadway performer
- Marilyn Monroe (1926–1962), American actress
- Marilyn Mosby (born 1980), American politician and lawyer
- Marilyn Nelson (born 1946), American poet, translator, biographer, and author
- Marilyn Neufville (born 1952), Jamaican sprinter
- Marilyn Norry, Canadian actress
- Marilyn Olinger (1928–2006), American baseball player
- Marilyn Pieronek (born 1962), Canadian TikToker
- Marilyn Quayle (born 1949), American lawyer, author and Second Lady of the United States
- Marilyn Ramenofsky (born 1946), American freestyle swimmer
- Marilyn Roche (died 2003), American politician
- Marilyn Scott (born 1949), American singer
- Marilyn Singer (born 1948), American author of children's books
- Marilyn Smith, American aerospace engineer
- Marilyn Strickland (born 1962), American politician
- Marilyn vos Savant (born 1946), American columnist and author
- Marilyn Vann, Cherokee Nation engineer and activist
- Marilyn Waltz (1931–2006), Playboy magazine's February 1954, April 1954, April 1955 Playmate of the Month
- Marilyn Waring (born 1952), New Zealand politician
- Marilyn Wilson-Rutherford (born 1947), American singer
- Marilynn Webb (1937–2021), New Zealand artist
- Marilyn Ziering, American business executive and philanthropist from Los Angeles, California

=== Stage name ===
- Brian Hugh Warner, American musician and artist who goes by the stage name "Marilyn Manson"

== Marylyn ==
- Marylyn Addo (born 1970), German infectiologist
- Marylyn Chiang (born 1977), Canadian swimmer
- Marylyn D. Ritchie, biologist
- Marylyn Dintenfass (born 1943), American artist

== Merrelyn ==
A variation of Marilyn is Merrelyn, sometimes spelled as Merrilyn. Notable people with the name include:

- Merrelyn Emery, Australian psychologist, co-refiner with Fred Emery of the Search Conference participative planning process
- Merrilyn Goos, Australian mathematician
- Merrilyn (Merri) Rose (born 1955), Australian politician

== Characters ==
- Marilyn Chambers, fictional character from the Australian soap opera, Home and Away
- Marilyn Chambers, minor fictional character in British television series, The Bill
- Marilyn Whirlwind, a character in the Northern Exposure TV series
- Marilyn Lee, a character from the book Everything I Never Told You

== See also ==
- Maralyn Bailey (died 2002), formerly missing person lost at sea
