= List of Northern Exposure episodes =

Northern Exposure is an American Northern comedy-drama television series about the eccentric residents of a fictional small town in Alaska, that ran on CBS from July 12, 1990, to July 26, 1995, with a total of 110 episodes.

== Series overview ==
Season	Episodes	Originally released		Rank	Rating
Season	Episodes	First released	Last released	Rank	Rating
1	8	July 12, 1990	August 30, 1990	N/A	N/A
2	7	April 8, 1991	May 20, 1991	N/A	N/A
3	23	September 23, 1991	May 18, 1992	16	15.5
4	25	September 28, 1992	May 24, 1993	11	15.2
5	24	September 20, 1993	May 23, 1994	14	14.4
6	23	September 19, 1994	July 26, 1995	41	11.2 (Tied with Hangin' with Mr. Cooper and Walker, Texas Ranger)

== Episodes ==
=== Season 1 (1990) ===
No. overall	No. in season	Title	Directed by	Written by	Original release date	U.S. viewers (millions)
1	1	"Pilot"	Joshua Brand	Joshua Brand & John Falsey	July 12, 1990	13.5
Dr. Joel Fleischman arrives in Alaska and is informed that due to a surplus of doctors, instead of working in a modern hospital in Anchorage, he will be the sole doctor in the remote village of Cicely for the next four years, the service he owes as payment for his student loan. He tries frantically to get out of the assignment before realizing the penalties are too steep. Many of the main characters are introduced.
2	2	"Brains, Know How and Native Intelligence"	Peter O'Fallon	Stuart Stevens	July 19, 1990	14.2
Ed gets Joel to talk to his medicine man uncle (Frank Salsedo). The man is seriously ill, but refuses to seek conventional medical treatment out of a fear of losing face with his patients. Maggie berates Joel for not being able to fix his toilet, calling him helpless. Joel decides to try to fix his shower when the hot water stops working. When Maggie hurts her knee, she goes to Joel, but he gives her a hard time for "being helpless". Chris is fired from the radio station after speaking of poet Walt Whitman's homosexuality on air. Joel makes a house call to Maggie (and makes up with her) after having a talk with Uncle Anku, who takes Joel's medical advice after a talk with his wife.
3	3	"Soapy Sanderson"	Steve Cragg	Story by : Karen Hall & Jerry Stahl; Teleplay by : Karen Hall	July 26, 1990	12.9
An old hermit dies, leaving his land jointly to Maggie and Joel, who have radically different ideas about what to do with it. She wants to create a nature preserve, while he has been approached by rich natives who want to buy it. Joel tells Maggie about the offer, but conceals the fact that the natives wish to use it as a tax shelter. Ed tags along as a film crew works on a documentary on the deceased, Dr. Soapy Sanderson.
4	4	"Dreams, Schemes and Putting Greens"	Dan Lerner	Sean Clark	August 2, 1990	13.3
Shelly becomes pregnant and a wedding is arranged, but Holling has a deep-rooted fear. His family is long-lived; both his father and grandfather were centenarians, while their wives died young, leaving them alone and grieving for over sixty years each. Holling vowed to avoid their fate. Meanwhile, Maurice entertains a Japanese investor (Michael Paul Chan) interested in building a resort in Cicely, who takes Joel's advice to add a golf course.
5	5	"The Russian Flu"	David Carson	David Assael	August 9, 1990	13.2
Joel's fiancée Elaine (Jessica Lundy) arrives for a visit, only to have the entire town come down with the flu, ruining their time together. In their delirium, the townspeople blame the Russians and eventually the helpless doctor. Marilyn prescribes a foul-smelling native remedy that cures everyone, but refuses to reveal its ingredients. Joel attempts to coax the recipe out of her, saying they could sell it to a pharmaceutical company, and she could use that money for badly needed tribal aid. In the second of two dream sequences, tribute is paid to Twin Peaks famous waterfall opening scene and other recurring characters and catchphrases of the series.
6	6	"Sex, Lies and Ed’s Tapes"	Sandy Smolan	Joshua Brand & John Falsey	August 16, 1990	13.7
Shelly turns out not to be pregnant; it was all in her mind. To further complicate her relationship with Holling, her twenty-year-old hockey player husband, Wayne (Brandon Douglas) shows up, looking for a divorce so he can marry her best friend. As they get reacquainted, they begin having second thoughts. Rick (Grant Goodeve) visits Joel for a physical, who finds a growth on Rick's chest. Mindful of the weird, untimely deaths of all of Maggie's other boyfriends, he becomes worried. It turns out to be a false alarm, but Maggie resents Rick's belief in the "O'Connell Curse". Ed has trouble picking a subject for his screenplay. He imagines the other residents in scenes from Raiders of the Lost Ark and Midnight Cowboy before finally taking Joel's advice and writing about what he knows - the inhabitants of Cicely. The episode's title is a takeoff of the Steven Soderbergh film Sex, Lies, and Videotape.
7	7	"A Kodiak Moment"	Max Tash	Steve Wasserman & Jessica Klein	August 23, 1990	14.4
Maurice receives word that his brother Malcolm has died, making him the last of the Minnifields. He persuades Chris to become his heir and tries to mold him in his own image, but this drives Chris away. Now without an heir, Maurice announces his plan to live forever. Ed informs Holling that Jesse, the bear that nearly killed him, has returned. Holling, Ed, and Shelly try to track it down, but get sidetracked when Holling spends most of his time in a tent with Shelly while Ed sees and takes a photo of the bear on the ride home. As part of his contract, Joel has to teach a childbearing class in another community. He charters Maggie's plane to take him there. They argue when he recommends the women just ask for an epidural rather than natural childbirth, which goes awry when a student starts to have contractions, which helps Joel and Maggie bond a bit. The episode's title is a takeoff of the Eastman Kodak company slogan "a Kodak moment".
8	8	"Aurora Borealis: A Fairy Tale for Grown-Ups"	Peter O'Fallon	Charles Rosin	August 30, 1990	13.0
The Northern Lights cause dreaming to intensify among the residents. Joel hears about "Adam" (Adam Arkin), the local version of Bigfoot. When his truck breaks down one night on a lonely road after a house call, he encounters the mysterious creature, who turns out to be an arrogant hermit living deep in the woods. However, nobody in Cicely believes him. Bernard (Richard Cummings Jr.), an African American, shows up. He sold his condo in Portland, bought a motorcycle and rode north without quite knowing why. He and Chris find themselves strangely in tune, even sharing the same dream. They finally learn that they share the same father and the same birthday. Satisfied, Bernard returns to Portland. Joel takes Ed and Maggie into the woods to try to prove that Adam is real, but finds only pieces of a garlic press. Note: In 1997, TV Guide ranked this episode number 65 on its '100 Greatest Episodes of All Time' list.

=== Season 2 (1991) ===
No. overall	No. in season	Title	Directed by	Written by	Original release date	U.S. viewers (millions)
9	1	"Goodbye to All That"	Stuart Margolin	Robin Green	April 8, 1991	19.7
Joel receives a Dear John letter from his fiancée Elaine, who married a retired federal judge, which leads to him having to reckon with his fear of rejection that see him imagining a younger version of himself talking to him about having to get it together. When a depressed Joel tells Ed about not having closure with Elaine, Ed gets Holling and Maggie to try and give him a sense of closure, complete with Maggie wearing a dress in the midst of winter. Meanwhile, after Holling installs a satellite dish at the bar as a gift for Shelly, she becomes addicted to television shows from around the world and buys $4,000 of products from home shopping networks. Shelly, a Catholic, finally breaks down and persuades Chris to hear her confession.
10	2	"The Big Kiss"	Sandy Smolan	Henry Bromell	April 15, 1991	18.5
When Ed wants to learn more about his parents (who abandoned him as a child), he receives help from One-Who-Waits (Floyd "Red Crow" Westerman), his 256-year-old Indian spirit guide. Meanwhile, a gorgeous woman (Jessika Cardinahl) passing through town steals Chris' voice. One-Who-Waits tells Chris (via Ed) that the only way to get his voice back is to sleep with the town's most beautiful woman - and Chris (and the rest of the town) believes Maggie is the one.
11	3	"All Is Vanity"	Nick Marck	Andrew Schneider & Diane Frolov	April 22, 1991	17.5
Holling turns Shelly on when he faces off against a drunken roughneck and then decides to get a circumcision after intercourse with her to be "more in style". When an unknown man dies in Joel's waiting room, the locals try to ascertain his identity and then become attached to him, refusing to give him up to the state coroner. Maggie is embarrassed when her dad arrives on a surprise visit and gets more than she bargained for when she begs Joel to pretend to be her boyfriend.
12	4	"What I Did for Love"	Steve Robman	Ellen Herman	April 29, 1991	13.4
Maggie has some surreal dreams that portend Joel's death should he fly to New York for his vacation, and is unsure about whether to tell him about them. The townsfolk fall in love with his substitute Dave, making Joel jealous. Eventually a town meeting is held in which Joel is given an impromptu funeral before he leaves so he can be there for it. Joel has his own surreal dream about the crash of his flight where Maggie appears. In the end, Joel changes his mind and does not fly. Meanwhile, Maurice is visited by a married "astronaut groupie" for a yearly fling that plays into his "privacy fetish". Chris reveals that the town was founded by a lesbian couple, Roslyn and Cicely, fleeing narrow-mindedness in Montana in the early 1900s.
13	5	"Spring Break"	Rob Thompson	David Assael	May 6, 1991	17.3
Spring arrives and Maggie and Joel find their dreams invaded by each other. Maurice is smitten with state trooper Barbara Semanski (Diane Delano). The citizens of Cicely have their yearly bout of spring fever, experiencing all kinds of weird feelings, stolen radios, and Holling's urge to pick fights and "do some damage"; Holling winds up challenging the cop to a boxing match, which reaches a boiling point when the ice starts to crack. Ed becomes a "detective" to solve the case of the stolen goods; he finds out that it was Chris, who wanted to remind people that chaos still reigns in Alaska along with just having to sometimes do something bad. Joel and Maggie confront each other over their lingering sexual tension, which results in them hashing it out in a passionate argument. The coming of spring also brings Cicely's version of the annual running of the bulls: men streaking down the main street.
14	6	"War and Peace"	Bill D'Elia	Robin Green & Henry Bromell	May 13, 1991	15.9
A Russian opera singer and international celebrity (Elya Baskin) makes his yearly trek to Cicely to bring gifts to the townsfolk. His visit reopens old wounds with Maurice, however, who is intent on another challenging chess game. Ed loses his virginity to Light Feather Duncan (Dana Andersen), who is only excited by his flowery letters, which Chris writes for him (in the manner of Cyrano de Bergerac); the plans to woo her go awry after she finds the source of the letters and is more attracted to the words than either Ed or Chris. Holling is plagued by dreams that deprive him of sleep; he initially believes he needs to go out into the woods and kill a moose, but he finds that all he needed to find sleep without dreams was to simply go out there. Maurice challenges Nikolai to a duel after alleging that the latter (technically) cheated in the chess match. When it comes time for the duel, with the whole town watching, Joel breaks the fourth wall and addresses the audience, reflecting on the first Gulf War — and everyone agrees to move on to the next scene.
15	7	"Slow Dance"	David Carson	Diane Frolov & Andrew Schneider	May 20, 1991	18.6
A satellite plunges out of orbit and crashes into Maggie's boyfriend Rick, killing him instantly and fusing with him; Joel has to inform Maggie about Rick's death. A disgruntled wife tries to persuade Maggie to date her husband in the hope that he too will fall victim to the "curse". At Rick's funeral, his casket, complete with satellite parts sticking out, is rolled into the church, with Maggie storming out after no one can stop laughing at the sight. Joel, not wanting to believe in the curse, offers to dance with her at the bar, which leads to other couples dancing along. Holling encounters an old lady acquaintance from Nome, Alaska, which makes Shelly jealous, but Holling states that he loves her for her youth. Two men, Ron and Erick (Doug Ballard and Don McManus), are interested in purchasing a house from Maurice. As Maurice closes the deal, he is disgusted when he finds out they are a gay couple. However, he is torn when they misinterpret his hostility and raise their bid. He ends up selling, while offering suggestions for the bed and breakfast they plan to set up there.

=== Season 3 (1991–92) ===
No. overall	No. in season	Title	Directed by	Written by	Original release date	U.S. viewers (millions)
16	1	"The Bumpy Road to Love"	Nick Marck	Martin Sage & Sybill Adelman	September 23, 1991	23.5
Adam drags Joel along to a house call for his wife, Eve (Valerie Mahaffey), a hypochondriac with a long list of imagined maladies. After the couple argues, Eve knocks Joel out with a kettle and chains him up. Another argument between Adam and Eve leads to Joel sitting them down for an impromptu therapy session. The unveiling of a statue of Rick, who was killed by a falling satellite, brings Maggie face-to-face with a girlfriend of Rick's she never knew about, which leads to her getting drunk and talking about the weird habits of men; Ruth-Anne helps her out by telling her about the affair she had in wartime with a British pilot who perished. Maurice tries to woo Officer Barbara, which hits a snag when she finds out he has no qualms about cheating on his taxes. He tries to get her back with a donation to the police, with no success.
17	2	"Only You"	Bill D'Elia	Ellen Herman	September 30, 1991	22.5
Joel learns that women are physically attracted to Chris because of his pheromones. Chris develops a crush on traveling optometrist Dr. Irene Rondenet (Caitlin Clarke), the one woman unaffected by his scent. Maurice's resentment over Shelly leaving him for Holling returns after he thinks Holling's photo of him smiling makes him look like a fool; it turns out that all three principals have completely different recollections of Shelly's first encounter with Holling. Maggie worries about getting old when Dr. Rondenet informs her she is farsighted.
18	3	"Oy, Wilderness"	Miles Watkins	Robin Green	October 7, 1991	22.2
While returning from administering immunizations in a remote village, Joel and Maggie are stranded in the wilderness when Maggie's plane develops engine trouble. While Maggie goes hunting in response to his complaining about the food, he begins to look at her broken airplane engine as a medical problem. Shelly's best friend Cindy (Christine Elise) comes to town to tell Shelly that she has married Shelly's husband Wayne, a minor league hockey player, and to ask Shelly to divorce him. They air their grievances and eventually make up.
19	4	"Animals R Us"	Nick Marck	Robin Green	October 14, 1991	21.8
Ed becomes so discouraged when he sees the footage compiled of the film he has been making with Holling and Chris as actors. Joel visits Ed, and their conversation (involving Ed showing him letters from his pen-pal Martin Scorsese) inspire him to start anew and film what he knows: the community of Cicely. Maggie comes to believe that a stray dog is the reincarnation of her boyfriend Rick. Maurice persuades Marilyn to become his business partner in her ostrich farm, but Marilyn cancels the deal when his frequent visits to the farm make the ostriches so nervous they lay puny eggs.
20	5	"Jules et Joel"	Jim Hayman	Stuart Stevens	October 28, 1991	20.4
On Halloween, Joel knocks himself unconscious while chasing after an overage trick-or-treater who sprayed silly string on him when Joel tried giving him only a dime. The next day, his slick twin brother (and polar opposite) Jules shows up. He talks Joel into switching identities like they did when they were kids. Jules (as Joel) pursues Maggie, while Joel (as Jules) gets jailed and ends up being given an impromptu psychoanalysis by Sigmund Freud. It turns out to be just a dream. Joel does not have a twin brother, but the experience affects his relationship with Maggie. Meanwhile, Chris prepares for an old friend from his hometown who had committed a string of bombings ten years before (the trick or treater from earlier). He wants Chris's help in turning himself in. The title is a takeoff of François Truffaut's film Jules et Jim.
21	6	"The Body in Question"	David Carson	Henry Bromell	November 4, 1991	21.8
The frozen body of a French soldier is found, along with a diary that claims that Napoleon came to Alaska with the deceased, rather than fight the Battle of Waterloo. Joel gets a visit from the prophet Elijah, and as his disbelief is slowly undermined, he begins to worry that his stay in Cicely is changing him. Maurice aspires to build a museum to take advantage of the frozen body. Holling, seeing the body as a reminder of his descent from evil French aristocrats, is worried about what Shelly would think, and aspires to not have children, while Ed gets encouragement from Ruth-Anne about continuing to write. The body disappears, stolen by the Tellakutan tribe, who evidently are of French descent.
22	7	"Roots"	Sandy Smolan	Dennis Koenig & Jordan Budde	November 11, 1991	21.4
Fleischman's ex-fiancée Elaine, who jilted him for a much older man, shows up unannounced after the death of her husband. Fleischman is very upset, but Maggie talks him into reconnecting with Elaine. They do, which triggers mixed feelings in Maggie. Chris has dreams of African dancers. The arrival of his half-brother Bernard helps him decide to declare himself a "person of color" and interpret the dreams to mean he should go to Africa. Adam makes another appearance.
23	8	"A-Hunting We Will Go"	Bill D'Elia	Craig Volk	November 18, 1991	20.9
Joel is shocked when Maggie shows up with a magnificent deer she has shot. After she berates him for not knowing what he is talking about, he decides to go along on a hunting trip with Holling and Chris. He ends up shooting a grouse before taking it back to try and treat the bird to health, but it ends up dead. Meanwhile, Ed worries about Ruth-Anne after her foot injury and finding out that she just turned 75. Ed throws a belated surprise party for Ruth-Anne at The Brick, with some of the food provided by the hunters.
24	9	"Get Real"	Michael Katleman	Diane Frolov & Andrew Schneider	December 9, 1991	21.2
A small traveling circus troupe (portrayed by members of Cirque du Soleil) is temporarily stranded in Cicely when their bus breaks down, and the silent "Flying Man" (Bill Irwin) takes a fancy to Marilyn. Shelly takes offense to Holling tactlessly noting that she has "inordinately large" feet. With Ed's help, Joel studies hard for a medical exam he wants to take.
25	10	"Seoul Mates"	Jack Bender	Diane Frolov & Andrew Schneider	December 16, 1991	23.3
The town celebrates the holidays with a Raven pageant, while Maggie dreads going home for the holidays and is publicly relieved (but privately saddened) when her parents instead take a Caribbean vacation. Joel, who is Jewish, feels guilty about getting his first Christmas tree. Holling sings "Ave Maria" for Shelly, who is pining for a traditional Christmas mass. Maurice is shocked to learn he has a grown Korean son (Min-Hyung Song), Duk Won, from his Korean War service when the man, his mother and his son show up unannounced. He confesses to Chris that a non-white son disturbs him, but eventually bonds with Duk Won.
26	11	"Dateline: Cicely"	Michael Fresco	Jeff Melvoin	January 6, 1992	23.5
Maurice boosts his local newspaper's circulation by hiring Adam as a secret columnist; the first of his articles claims that trees have voices. Maggie hears them, but Joel is characteristically skeptical. Holling offers Chris a partnership in The Brick to raise money to pay off his delinquent tax bill. Chris sets about making changes that increase profits, but also irritate Holling.
27	12	"Our Tribe"	Lee Shallat	David Assael	January 13, 1992	23.1
Joel reluctantly undergoes a cultural conversion after a tribal elder, grateful for being cured, insists on "adopting" him into her tribe. A mysterious Holling sends Shelly back home to Saskatoon for a visit and shuts down The Brick, ostensibly to wax the floors; Maggie tries to find out what he is really doing.
28	13	"Things Become Extinct"	Dean Parisot	Story by : Mitchell Burgess; Teleplay by : Robin Green	January 20, 1992	23.1
After he learns that his Uncle Charlie has died, Holling has a mid-life crisis. Ed films Ira Wingfeather (Bryson G. Liberty) making duck flutes. Joel feels culturally isolated when he has trouble finding other Jews in Alaska, so Maurice takes him on a road trip to visit one of the few to try to cheer him up.
29	14	"Burning Down the House"	Rob Thompson	Robin Green	February 3, 1992	23.3
Maggie receives a double dose of trauma when her visiting mother (Bibi Besch) announces she is divorcing Maggie's father and accidentally burns down Maggie's house. Meanwhile, Chris searches for just the "right" cow to fling with the trebuchet he is building for his performance art. He becomes depressed when Ed mentions that it has already been done (in the movie Monty Python and the Holy Grail). In the end, he finds a replacement in Maggie's burnt piano.
30	15	"Democracy in America"	Michael Katleman	Jeff Melvoin	February 24, 1992	21.5
Incumbent Holling is stung when his old friend Edna (Rita Taggart) decides to run against him for the office of mayor, a post he has held uncontested for 23 years, because of a promise he forgot about. Shelly finds power to be an aphrodisiac, Chris waxes patriotic, Ed anticipates his first vote, and Joel and Maggie argue about party politics.
31	16	"Three Amigos"	Matthew Nodella	Mitchell Burgess & Robin Green	March 2, 1992	21.6
The death of a longtime friend sends Holling and Maurice into the wilderness with his lusty widow (Joanna Cassidy), to make good on a promise to bury him miles from civilization at No-Name Point. Chris reads from The Call of the Wild, which parallels Holling and Maurice's journey.
32	17	"Lost and Found"	Steve Robman	Diane Frolov & Andrew Schneider	March 9, 1992	21.3
After hearing a voice and seeing nobody around, Joel discovers his cabin is believed to be haunted by a young man who committed suicide decades before. Eve thinks she is suffering from an exotic illness, but Joel has a much different diagnosis. Maurice is disappointed when his Korean War commanding officer and old friend (Noble Willingham) turns out to be less than perfect.
33	18	"My Mother, My Sister"	Rob Thompson	Kate Boutilier & Mitchell Burgess	March 16, 1992	25.5
Shelly's mother Tammy (Wendy Schaal) drops in unexpectedly, followed by her new 24-year-old US Army mechanic husband (Sean O'Bryan), who thinks that Shelly is Tammy's sister. A baby abandoned in Joel's waiting room is temporarily adopted by the townspeople. Adam experiences the same pains as his pregnant wife.
34	19	"Wake Up Call"	Nick Marck	Diane Frolov & Andrew Schneider	March 23, 1992	26.9
The coming of spring brings love to Maggie, a new skin to Shelly, and to Joel a reminder of the importance of blending compassion with his scientific knowledge. A tall, handsome stranger (Andreas Wisniewski) comes to Maggie's aid when her pickup truck gets stuck in the mud. A romance develops, but there is an unusual problem. Joel reluctantly agrees to be shadowed by Marilyn's cousin Leonard (Graham Greene), a traditional native healer, who wants to learn a little about modern medical practices. They disagree about how to treat Shelly's skin problem.
35	20	"The Final Frontier"	Tom Moore	Jeffrey Vlaming	April 27, 1992	21.4
Holling is devastated when Ed tells him that Jesse, a bear who almost mauled Holling to death, has died; Holling wanted to kill Jesse himself. Ron and Erick have great success with their Sourdough Inn, catering to Japanese couples, much to Maurice's disgust. A package that has traveled the world arrives in Cicely addressed to an unknown person, piquing everyone's curiosity.
36	21	"It Happened in Juneau"	Michael Katleman	David Assael	May 4, 1992	23.4
Maggie flies Joel to a medical conference in Juneau, where he hopes to hook up with single young women doctors. Maggie looks forward to seeing a road production of Les Miz. They are forced to share a hotel suite (with separate bedrooms). Joel meets a New York City doctor (Beth Broderick) who wants to sleep with him, but is put off by her aggressive approach. Eventually he and Maggie decide to have sex, but she falls asleep before they do. The next morning, she assumes they did. Joel, insulted by her embarrassment, does not correct her and agrees to never to speak of it again. Chris experiences difficulty speaking, and he and his brother Bernard, newly returned from Africa, are out of sync with each other for the first time.
37	22	"Our Wedding"	Nick Marck	Diane Frolov & Andrew Schneider	May 11, 1992	23.5
When Eve becomes pregnant, she and Adam decide to wed for the baby's sake, but she has misgivings and a secret Adam knows nothing about. Maggie avoids Joel, still believing they slept together in Juneau. When Joel finally confesses the truth, he is surprised by her reaction. Officer Semanski serves Maurice with an official complaint from his neighbor (Ralph P. Martin).
38	23	"Cicely"	Rob Thompson	Diane Frolov & Andrew Schneider	May 18, 1992	22.7
Joel hits, but does not seriously injure, 108-year-old former Cicely resident Ned Svenborg (Roberts Blossom) with his pickup truck late one night. In flashbacks, the man tells current residents the story of Cicely's founders, lesbians Cicely (Yvonne Suhor) and Roslyn (Jo Anderson). In 1908, these "free-thinking" women drive into the then-nameless frontier town, ruled with an iron fist by the absent Mace Mobrey and his gang. The pair realize their utopian dream, winning over the rough residents and transforming the place into an artists' colony, "The Paris of the North". Roslyn's friend Franz Kafka shows up, burdened by writer's block. Tragedy ensues when Cicely falls ill and Roslyn becomes depressed, while Mace returns and sends his philosophical henchman Kit to fetch his girl, Sally, who has fallen in love with Abe. Members of the cast played characters in the flashback: Rob Morrow as Franz Kafka, Barry Corbin as Mace Mobrey, Janine Turner as Mary O'Keefe, John Cullum as Abe, Darren E. Burrows as young Ned Svenborg, John Corbett as Kit, Cynthia Geary as Sally, Elaine Miles as Marilyn, and Peg Philips as Rhoda.

=== Season 4 (1992–93) ===
No. overall	No. in season	Title	Directed by	Written by	Original release date	U.S. viewers (millions)
39	1	"Northwest Passages"	Dean Parisot	Robin Green	September 28, 1992	24.9
Maggie faces her 30th birthday with unease. Taking Ed's advice, she spends the day camping alone to try to come to terms with her personal issues. Joel rescues a sick and delirious Maggie after she faces the criticisms of her dead ex-boyfriends (Grant Goodeve as Rick Pederson, Patrick Warburton as Glenn, Ted Henning as David, Will Plunkett as Bruce, and Garrett Bennett as Steve Escandon). Marilyn asks Ruth-Anne and Chris to teach her how to drive, with mixed results. Maurice rambles endlessly into a tape recorder about his past while writing his memoirs, annoying the townspeople.
40	2	"Midnight Sun"	Michael Katleman	Michael Katleman	October 5, 1992	22.2
Joel's circadian rhythm is thrown off by the midnight sun. He becomes "light loony", full of energy and unable to sleep. Maurice chooses him to coach the Cicely Quarks in their annual basketball game against Sleetmute. Joel also comes on to Maggie in his hyperactive state. An old friend (Jim Haynie) drops in to visit Ruth-Anne and outfits the town from his collection of fashionable ensembles.
41	3	"Nothing's Perfect"	Nick Marck	Diane Frolov & Andrew Schneider	October 12, 1992	21.9
Chris accidentally kills a dog with his truck and quickly falls in love with its owner, animal-loving math doctoral student Amy (Wendel Meldrum). She is strongly attracted to him too, but after her pet parakeet dies while in his care, they agree he needs to sacrifice something he loves as much to save their relationship. Maurice buys a very expensive antique Augsburg clock, and Rolf Hauser (Mark Pellegrino), a highly trained specialist, assembles it for him. Holling and Shelly are invited to a dinner at Maurice's to celebrate his new clock, but he becomes irate when it does not keep accurate time.
42	4	"Heroes"	Charles Braverman	Jeff Vlaming	October 19, 1992	21.7
Chris struggles to figure out how to give his deceased friend and mentor Tooley (Mickey Jones) a proper sendoff after he has his remains mailed to Chris. Heavy-metal rock star Brad Bonner (Adam Ant) mistakenly arrives in Cicely instead of Sicily, and soon Ed is filming him as he prepares to stage a concert with native drummers. Shelly swoons over Brad, making Holling ill at ease.
43	5	"Blowing Bubbles"	Rob Thompson	Mark B. Perry	November 2, 1992	22.9
Maggie's interest is aroused after ex-lawyer Mike Monroe (Anthony Edwards) relocates to Cicely. Mike has become hyper-allergic to many man-made substances and lives alone in a geodesic dome in the woods. Joel suspects Mike's condition is psychosomatic. With help from Maggie (and Maurice), Mike introduces himself to the town. Ruth-Anne must also cope with a new addition to the community - her investment banker son Matthew (Joel Polis), who has been fired, along with the rest of his department, and is in search of a simpler life. Maurice, however, tempts him with a business startup inspired by Mike's arrival.
44	6	"On Your Own"	Joan Tewkesbury	Sy Rosen & Christian Williams	November 9, 1992	19.4
The Flying Man returns to Cicely (this time with Mummenschanz) to woo Marilyn. Ed finds a ring that once belonged to Federico Fellini; he feels himself changing because of it. Maurice has his will changed to include his recently discovered Korean son, Duk Won. Maggie is not her usual self as she spends more time with Mike.
45	7	"The Bad Seed"	Randall Miller	Mitchell Burgess	November 16, 1992	19.8
Holling is shocked when his previously unknown, illegitimate, con artist daughter (Valerie Perrine) arrives in town - especially since he believed he was sterile. Holling does not like the influence Jackie has on Shelly. Marilyn moves out of her parents' home, and Maggie helps her look for her dream house. Mrs. Whirlwind (Armenia Miles, Elaine Miles' real-life mother) puts her house up for sale. Ed is excited about the annual migratory visit of Princess, a crane he raised after she was abandoned as a chick.
46	8	"Thanksgiving"	Michael Fresco	David Assael	November 23, 1992	21.6
Cicelians prepare for the annual Day of the Dead parade and Thanksgiving Day feast. The town's Native Americans have a Thanksgiving tradition of throwing tomatoes at white people. Joel is stunned to find he owes the state of Alaska a fifth year of service. Maggie's relationship with Mike progresses. Chris feels out-of-sorts and cannot figure out why.
47	9	"Do the Right Thing"	Nick Marck	Diane Frolov & Andrew Schneider	November 30, 1992	22.0
Viktor (David Hemmings), a former member of the KGB, visits Cicely to sell Maurice (who is still working on his memoirs) his dossier, which contains some very embarrassing information. He also talks Joel into accepting the dossier of a Russian Jew also named Fleishman as payment for his treatment. Jason (John Hawkes), a dedicated young health inspector who once shut down his own father's establishment, gives The Brick its first checkup in more than thirty years. Uneasy, Holling encourages Shelly to go see a movie with Jason after Jason shows interest in her. When a colleague is killed on a flight that she was supposed to pilot, Maggie vows to live each day as if it were her last. She is nice to everyone, even Joel, but her body rebels.
48	10	"Crime and Punishment"	Rob Thompson	Jeff Melvoin	December 14, 1992	21.5
Chris's past finally catches up with him; he is apprehended for breaking parole in his home state of West Virginia years before. A circuit judge (Anne Haney) presides at his extradition hearing. Chris is willing to go back to West Virginia and prison, but Maurice recruits Mike, the only lawyer around, to represent him, even though Mike has never handled a criminal case. Chris hears what the townspeople think of him during Mike's novel (and desperate) defense.
49	11	"Survival of the Species"	Dean Parisot	Denise Dobbs	January 4, 1993	22.9
Ed becomes concerned about the environment after a nightmare. Mike helps Ed with his quest to preserve the seeds of plant species for the future. When Maggie discovers ancient Alaskan Native relics buried in her backyard, Maurice takes over, with Ron and Erick leading an archaeology dig. Maggie reclaims her yard from the men, with the support of the other women of the community. Holling gives 12-year-old Brad (Edan Gross), a runaway juvenile delinquent, a job at The Brick, where he becomes smitten with Shelly. Chris teaches Brad about life and love.
50	12	"Revelations"	Daniel Attias	Diane Frolov & Andrew Schneider	January 11, 1993	23.4
Chris takes time off for a spiritual retreat at a monastery, with Bernard filling in for him at the radio station. Chris is welcomed by Brother Timothy (Stephen Root) and finds monastery life different than he had imagined. He is also inexplicably attracted to (and has troubling erotic dreams about) reclusive Brother Simon (Elizabeth Juviler), who has taken a vow of silence, not knowing "his" secret. Ruth-Anne pays Maurice the remaining amount owed on her store in one big lump sum, which angers him. Joel becomes perturbed when he has no patients.
51	13	"Duets"	Win Phelps	Geoffrey Neigher	January 18, 1993	22.7
Ed's invisible spirit guide One-Who-Waits locates his father, Pete (Gordon Tootoosis). Ed goes to work on Pete's construction crew and gets to know him, but puts off revealing their relationship. With a push from One-Who-Waits, Ed finally tells Pete, who confirms that he is Ed's father. Maggie and Mike kiss, but then she remembers her track record: five boyfriends, all killed in unusual ways while in the prime of life. Arlen Briscoe (Kevin Conway), a blind traveling piano tuner, works on The Brick's ancient upright piano; his abrasive personality irritates Holling.
52	14	"Grosse Pointe, 48230"	Michael Katleman	Mitchell Burgess & Robin Green	February 1, 1993	24.0
Maggie bribes Joel with courtside seats to an NBA game into accompanying her to her Grammy's (Barbara Townsend) 80th birthday party in Grosse Pointe, Michigan, and pretending to be her boyfriend. Her real boyfriend, Mike, would never survive the trip. Joel meets Maggie's mother Jane (Bibi Besch), brother Jeffy (Dylan Baker) and Jeffy's unhappy wife Stephie (Lisa Waltz), as well as the various party guests. Grammy has locked herself in an upstairs bathroom, much to Jane's annoyance. Jane gets Maggie to try to coax Grammy out, as they get along much better. Joel plays a strenuous game of one-on-one basketball with Jed (D. David Morin), Maggie's ex-boyfriend, which results in Jed having to go to the hospital. Stephie confides to Joel (and others) that she is leaving Jeffy. Grammy finally comes out of the bathroom. As Maggie and Joel leave for the basketball game at Auburn Hills, he tells her that she must be one strong person, coming from a family like that.
53	15	"Learning Curve"	Michael Vittes	Jeff Vlaming	February 8, 1993	20.8
Joel becomes so worried when Marilyn goes on vacation by herself to have an adventure in Seattle that, when she does not check into the hotel he arranged for her, he flies down to search for her. Holling studies to obtain his high school diploma. The new schoolteacher (Jo Anderson) is a former US Air Force pilot, but her views of a woman's role in society are completely at odds with Maggie's.
54	16	"Ill Wind"	Rob Thompson	Jeff Melvoin	February 15, 1993	25.0
When the seasonal Coho winds blow, strange behavior follows. Joel tauntingly invites Maggie to punch him during an argument, and she obliges, breaking his nose. He files a lawsuit, and she retaliates with an eviction notice. The hostility builds until they tussle, which ends up with them having sex. Maurice becomes unhappy when Chris saves his life, feeling an unwanted obligation to do something in return. Ed is intrigued by death.
55	17	"Love's Labour Mislaid"	Joe Napolitano	Jeff Melvoin	February 22, 1993	21.4
Maggie forgets about having had sex with Joel, which dumbfounds and annoys him. Ed's uncle recommends he settle down in an arranged marriage, but there is a problem with his uncle's choice of wife, Debbie (Michelle St. John): she already has a boyfriend. When a rare Siberian tit is reported in the area, dedicated birdwatchers Holling and Ruth-Anne set out to photograph it.
56	18	"Northern Lights"	Bill D'Elia	Diane Frolov & Andrew Schneider	March 1, 1993	21.9
Maurice is at first disgusted when he spots a panhandler (Scott Paulin), then finds out he is a fellow ex-Marine and that he abandoned a good job for an unusual reason. Joel goes on strike when his annual vacation is denied because there is no replacement doctor available. Chris runs out of inspiration while working on a massive, metal outdoor sculpture. Maggie decides to risk a relationship with Mike, despite her deadly track record with boyfriends.
57	19	"Family Feud"	Adam Arkin	David Assael	March 8, 1993	20.8
Leonard unveils a totem pole he carved for the Whirlwind family, but its symbolism, referencing past history, reignites a dormant feud with another Tlingit clan over an incident in 1934. Shelly sees periodic visions of dancers. Joel thinks she may be schizoid, but Leonard has a different diagnosis (and cure). Joel is bothered by his inability to define his and Maggie's relationship.
58	20	"Homesick"	Nick Marck	Jeff Vlaming	March 15, 1993	22.2
With Mike now completely healthy, he feels obligated to leave Cicely and Maggie behind to continue his environmental crusade, leaving Maggie feeling betrayed. Now that Shelly and Holling are married, she becomes dissatisfied with how their bedroom looks. Holling tells her to redecorate it any way she wants, but is secretly appalled by the result. Maurice has his boyhood home moved from Oklahoma to Cicely to save it from demolition. The contents of a hidden childhood cache stir up the shameful memory of his theft of his brother Malcolm's beloved toy fish.
59	21	"The Big Feast"	Rob Thompson	Mitchell Burgess & Robin Green	March 22, 1993	21.5
To celebrate the 25th anniversary of Minnifield Communications, Maurice prepares one of his famously lavish parties, sparing no expense. Joel feels Maurice is getting back at him for his unintentional disclosure about Maurice to the IRS by not inviting him. Adam and Eve return to Cicely with their new baby. Adam takes over from the French chef (Adam's former apprentice) Maurice hired for the party. Shelly accidentally breaks a very expensive bottle of Maurice's wine, a 1929 Château Latour, but Eve comes to the rescue.
60	22	"Kaddish for Uncle Manny"	Michael Lange	Jeff Melvoin	May 3, 1993	19.7
The death of Joel's uncle hits him hard, as they were very close. In order to say Kaddish for the deceased, Joel needs ten Jews, but they are rare in Alaska. Maurice rallies the community to mount a search. After eight total strangers are found, Joel begins to question the tradition. Two Miller brothers come all the way from West Virginia to continue a Miller-Stevens feud that predates the Civil War, much to Chris's delight. His brother Bernard is reluctantly dragged into it. When Marilyn chooses Holling as her new dance partner for a competition, Shelly is bothered.
61	23	"Mud and Blood"	Jim Charleston	Diane Frolov & Andrew Schneider	May 10, 1993	17.3
With the coming of spring, Holling feels such an overpowering urge to reconnect with the earth and sow seeds that he pays a farmer to let him work the land. He finds, however, that Shelly's pregnancy satisfies his need. Maurice purchases a truffle pig. Maggie discovers that she has mysteriously become a positive force — among other things, she saves Dave from a falling sign — and decides to change her attitude about life.
62	24	"Sleeping with the Enemy"	Frank Prinzi	Mitchell Burgess & Robin Green	May 17, 1993	18.3
Duk Won seeks his father Maurice's approval of his fiancée, but Maurice finds out her father is his mortal Korean War enemy. With native speakers aging and their descendants not learning the language, Ed decides to dub the 1937 movie The Prisoner of Zenda in Tlingit. A pregnant Shelly loses interest in sex, so Holling has no outlet for his strong libido.
63	25	"Old Tree"	Michael Fresco	Diane Frolov & Robin Green	May 24, 1993	20.1
When Ootockalockatuvik or "Old Vicky", a beloved, centuries-old tree on Maurice's land, appears to be ailing, Joel is drafted as the nearest thing to a tree doctor. Everyone but Maurice wants to save her. Joel has an accident every time Maggie is nice to him. Shelly wakes up one morning to find she can only sing, not talk.

=== Season 5 (1993–94) ===
No. overall	No. in season	Title	Directed by	Written by	Original release date	U.S. viewers (millions)
64	1	"Three Doctors"	Daniel Attias	Diane Frolov & Andrew Schneider	September 20, 1993	21.3
The whole town pitches in to nurse Joel when he comes down with "glacier dropsy", a local disease he initially refuses to acknowledge exists. Ed finds himself waking up in high places (up a tree, on a rooftop); Leonard tells him he has been called to be a shaman. Much to her disappointment, Shelly finally stops singing.
65	2	"The Mystery of the Old Curio Shop"	Michael Fresco	Rogers Turrentine	September 27, 1993	20.7
Maurice receives several unpleasant reminders of his age, including a mild heart attack, the poor health of a visiting old comrade-in-arms and his first social security check. Maggie is not invited to her father's wedding in Europe. While shopping for a wedding gift, she (a fan of Nancy Drew, detective extraordinaire) finds and investigates a mystery of her own. Joel is thrilled to find traces of Yiddish in the Tlingit language.
66	3	"Jaws of Life"	Jim Charleston	Mitchell Burgess & Robin Green	October 4, 1993	20.4
Madame Tussauds sends a man (Brian George) to Maurice's place to put the finishing touches to a life-size wax replica of him for an upcoming exhibit. Chris discovers that simple daily medication for his high blood pressure may save him from the short lifespan of Stevens males, which causes him to reconsider his lifestyle and outlook on life. The dentalmobile comes to Cicely; everyone acts unnaturally around the dentist, Dr. John Summers (Jay O. Sanders), which annoys him.
67	4	"Altered Egos"	John David Coles	Jeff Melvoin	October 11, 1993	20.6
Bernard shows up with his girlfriend (Lisa Darr), who turns out to have been Chris's lover when he was 22. Chris cannot remember her at all (he cannot recall a whole year of his life due to heavy drug use at the time). The half-brothers become estranged when she cannot tell their kisses apart in a blind test, as it raises questions about their uniqueness. Joel is worried that he is losing his big city smarts. Marilyn snoops through Joel's confidential medical files to check up on the men she dates; she drops any who have health issues.
68	5	"A River Doesn't Run Through It"	Nick Marck	Jeff Melvoin	October 25, 1993	18.6
Maggie agrees to be the high school's Homecoming Queen because the entire senior class consists of three boys, among them Kevin Wilkins (Jack Black). She frets that Kevin is developing a crush on her. Maurice, the richest man in the interior, negotiates the purchase of some land from Lester Haines, the first Native American to make the list of the top five wealthiest. Ruth-Anne is audited by an IRS agent having marital troubles.
69	6	"Birds of a Feather"	Mark Horowitz	Mitchell Burgess & Robin Green	November 1, 1993	19.3
Joel's parents visit. Joel has issues with his father (David Margulies). Marilyn tells his mother (Joanna Merlin) that she is spiritually an eagle, which comes in handy when she falls off a cliff. Holling reveals that he does not like sports, which causes friction with his bar patrons and Shelly.
70	7	"Rosebud"	Michael Fresco	Barbara Hall	November 8, 1993	16.1
Maurice enlists Ed to organize a film festival in Cicely to help him secure financing for a hotel and resort. Ed's friend, director Peter Bogdanovich, happens to be in Alaska and drops by to help him. Joel is asked to join Cicely's volunteer fire department. When his pickup truck catches on fire, he accuses fire chief Ruth-Anne of not responding quickly because he turned down the request.
71	8	"Heal Thyself"	Michael Katleman	Diane Frolov & Andrew Schneider	November 15, 1993	21.2
Ed is belittled by a short, supernatural Green Man (Phil Fondacaro); Leonard advises him the evil spirit is his low self-esteem. Shelly throws Holling out of their childbirth class when he is disruptive. Maggie misses the regular laundromat gossip-fest when she buys her own washer and dryer.
72	9	"A Cup of Joe"	Michael Lange	Mitchell Burgess & Robin Green	November 22, 1993	19.2
Ruth-Anne and Holling's relationship is strained when they learn that after Ruth-Anne's grandfather died in a famous blizzard, Holling's grandfather and others reluctantly ate his body to survive. Chris studies for his pilot's license. Joel learns that Marilyn is an astute detective when the office petty cash is stolen.
73	10	"First Snow"	Daniel Attias	Diane Frolov & Andrew Schneider	December 13, 1993	19.4
An aged patient and friend of Joel's (Harriet Medin) tells him she will die soon, even though he can find nothing medically wrong with her. Joel is traumatized when she does die, despite all his efforts. Maurice is devastated when Shelly lies about ever telling him she loved him. Maggie has a nagging sense that something is missing when she redecorates her home at the onset of winter.
74	11	"Baby Blues"	Jim Charleston	Barbara Hall	January 3, 1994	20.7
Shelly becomes nervous when other women brag about their difficult childbirths. Maggie and Joel find something in common: a dislike for babies. Ed's screenplay for The Shaman interests a Hollywood agent, but the man recommends far too many changes for Ed's liking.
75	12	"Mr. Sandman"	Michael Fresco	David Chase & Diane Frolov	January 10, 1994	20.2
When the aurora borealis flares up, residents of Cicely have each other's dreams. Maggie dreams about Holling's abusive father, while Maurice is embarrassed when his dream fetish for women's footwear interrupts the sleep of a man (Ron) he considers a pervert. Holling is suddenly repelled by food; he turns to Joel for psychoanalytic help, but it is Maggie who makes the connection to her dreams.
76	13	"Mite Makes Right"	Michael Vittes	Diane Frolov & Andrew Schneider	January 17, 1994	23.2
Maggie becomes fixated on dust mites after Joel diagnoses her with an allergy to them. She later goes on a date with him. Maurice gets more than he bargained for when he buys an extremely valuable Guarneri del Gesu violin for investment purposes; Cal Ingraham (Simon Templeman), the professional violist he hires to evaluate it, becomes obsessed with the instrument. Chris reaches an artistic impasse on a sculpture.
77	14	"A Bolt from the Blue"	Michael Lange	Jeff Melvoin	January 24, 1994	22.4
Adam sabotages the equipment for a fireworks display Maurice arranged for Presidents' Day, claiming that the head of the pyrotechnics company was an intelligence operative who betrayed a Contra guerrilla operation. Joel talks down a Forestry Service fire lookout from his isolated station after he is fired. Ed is struck by lightning, but escapes unharmed; he is left wondering if it means something.
78	15	"Hello, I Love You"	Michael Fresco	Mitchell Burgess & Robin Green	January 31, 1994	22.6
Shelly, scheduled for induced labor because she is overdue, meets a young girl named Miranda (Kaley Cuoco) at the laundromat; each time Shelly goes back there that day, the girl is years older. She comes to believe that Miranda ("Randi") is somehow her daughter. Shelly then gives birth to a girl and names her Miranda. When Ruth-Anne and Walt (Moultrie Patten) are stranded on the tundra overnight after her truck breaks down, Walt reveals his feelings for her.
79	16	"Northern Hospitality"	Oz Scott	Barbara Hall	February 28, 1994	20.7
Joel discovers he has breached social etiquette by accepting dinner invitations and not reciprocating, so he throws a party, but even with Maggie's help, it is a dismal failure. Chris is shaken when a radio listener blames him in a suicide note. Shelly, a Canadian, takes her child across the border to register her citizenship. Holling follows after her, fearing she will not return.
80	17	"Una Volta in L'Inverno"	Michael Vittes	Jeff Melvoin	March 7, 1994	21.8
Joel and Maggie are stranded in the airport shack during a snowstorm. Then Ed shows up. Ruth-Anne studies Italian in order to read The Divine Comedy in the original, with Shelly as her unlikely tutor. Walt becomes addicted to a special light visor designed to alleviate his depression caused by the seasonal lack of sunlight.
81	18	"Fish Story"	Bill D'Elia	Jeff Melvoin	March 14, 1994	20.0
Joel is uncomfortable with Maggie's offer to prepare a Passover dinner for him. Later, while fishing, he hooks a legendary lake monster called Gunaakadeit or "Goony" and has a Jonah-like experience. When her customers become too much for her, Ruth-Anne borrows Chris's motorcycle and hits the open road. Holling takes up painting by numbers.
82	19	"The Gift of the Maggie"	Patrick McKee	Mitchell Burgess & Robin Green	March 28, 1994	19.8
After a house fire, Maurice accepts an invitation to stay with Holling and Shelly for a few days. Joel is depressed when he has no one to "talk shop" with about a diagnosis he is very proud of; Maggie secretly tries to help out. Out hunting, Chris has his sights on a magnificent buck, but for some reason cannot pull the trigger.
83	20	"A Wing and a Prayer"	Lorraine Senna	Mitchell Burgess & Robin Green	April 11, 1994	20.1
On his morning paper route, Ed spots Ruth-Anne being cozy with Walt and, despite knowing better, blabs about it to others. Maggie and Maurice set out to build a homebuilt aircraft together, but have a falling out. Father Kevin McKerry (Tom Mason) comes to Cicely to baptize Randi.
84	21	"I Feel the Earth Move"	Michael Fresco	Jed Seidel	May 2, 1994	18.4
Ron and Erick decide to marry after eight years together, with Holling undercutting another caterer for the wedding repast. Maggie experiences severe, intermittent nausea that she fears is triggered by Joel.
85	22	"Grand Prix"	Michael Lange	Barbara Hall	May 9, 1994	14.6
Maurice stages a wheelchair race, fielding his own team and lining up sponsors like Reebok. Ed has another encounter with his Green Man, then battles External Validation (Ben Reed) on behalf of a driven race competitor. Ted (Tim Sampson), Marilyn's boyfriend, learns of the downside of wealth after working as a contractor for Lester Haines.
86	23	"Blood Ties"	Tom Moore	Mitchell Burgess & Robin Green	May 16, 1994	19.7
Jed, Maggie's former Grosse Pointe beau, arrives in Cicely, looking to resume their relationship. Joel loses his confidence during the annual blood drive, while Maurice competes with Lloyd Hillegas (Don S. Davis) to see whose community can donate the most blood. When Ed learns that he and a newcomer to town share the same very rare blood type, he hires a private detective to try to find out if she is his mother.
87	24	"Lovers and Madmen"	James Hayman	Jeff Melvoin	May 23, 1994	14.3
Joel stumbles upon a perfectly preserved woolly mammoth. Maurice uses bribery to get violinist Cal Ingraham (Simon Templeman) out of an insane asylum for a private birthday performance for Barbara Semanski (Diane Delano). Chris gets a rude awakening when a girl he had a crush on in high school visits.

=== Season 6 (1994–95) ===
No. overall	No. in season	Title	Directed by	Written by	Original release date	U.S. viewers (millions)
88	1	"Dinner at Seven-Thirty"	Michael Fresco	Diane Frolov & Andrew Schneider	September 19, 1994	16.6
Joel experiences an alternate reality in Manhattan after accidentally drinking Ed's healing concoction. In this reality, Joel is still a doctor, but married to Shelly, a corporate lawyer, while Maggie is the au pair for their two children and Maurice is their doorman. Joel and Shelly host a dinner party whose guests include: Ed, a wealthy investor; Ruth-Anne, a renowned doctor and Joel's boss; Chris, a tongue-tied assistant to Bernard; and Holling, a famous entertainer. Afterward, Joel comes to the conclusion that life in Cicely is not all that bad.
89	2	"Eye of the Beholder"	Jim Charleston	Mitchell Burgess & Robin Green	September 26, 1994	18.8
Working for private investigator Reynaldo Pinetree, Ed uncovers proof of an insurance scam perpetrated by his shady friend Hayden Keyes. Maggie regrets donating a mechanical bank, given to her by her grandmother, for a charity auction. Maurice's donation of a case of wine that has gone bad is bought by Holling.
90	3	"Shofar, So Good"	James Hayman	Jeff Melvoin	October 3, 1994	17.6
On Yom Kippur, Joel gets the Christmas Carol treatment, courtesy of Rabbi Schulman (Jerry Adler). Holling blames himself for not being there for his first daughter after she scams him again. Maurice holds a fox hunt, hoping to impress an attractive English aristocrat guest (Jill Gascoine), but the fox gets away beforehand.
91	4	"The Letter"	Jim Charleston	Meredith Stiehm	October 10, 1994	18.2
Maggie reads a letter she wrote as a 15-year-old (Tara Subkoff) to her 30-year-old adult self. She then has to defend her present situation to her younger, disapproving self. Joel takes risks when he has a cancer scare. Shelly learns that a chain letter has no effect on her life. The new barber (Bill Cobbs) rebuffs Chris's friendly overtures.
92	5	"The Robe"	Lorraine Senna	Sam Egan	October 17, 1994	18.6
Joel relishes the opportunity to conduct a medical study in conjunction with the Johns Hopkins School of Medicine (still stung that it turned him down for admission years ago), but Ed accidentally ruins it. Shelly is tempted by the offer by the Devil (in the guise of a spa salesman played by Charles Martin Smith) to fulfill her wildest dream: legalized gambling in Alaska and The Brick turned into a casino. Chris uses a ventriloquist dummy to offer straightforward opinions, in contrast to his more nuanced responses, and becomes irked when people prefer the dummy's advice.
93	6	"Zarya"	Jim Charleston	Diane Frolov & Andrew Schneider	October 31, 1994	15.8
This builds on the third-season episode "Cicely", with flashbacks to the early days of the town. Marilyn starts having dreams of a story her grandfather used to tell her at the same time as she begins having leg pains. Ed thinks that filming her as she relates what she can remember will help her recall the ending and cure her. Princess Anastasia (Tushka Bergen) and Vladimir Lenin (Christopher Neame) meet in Cicely to negotiate her possible return to her homeland. Romance blooms between Lenin's personal physician (Rob Morrow) and Anastasia's lady-in-waiting (Janine Turner), while Marilyn's grandfather (Anastasia's native guide, played by Darren Burrows) becomes infatuated with the princess.
94	7	"Full Upright Position"	Oz Scott	Mitchell Burgess & Robin Green	November 7, 1994	18.1
Joel invites Maggie along on an all-expenses-paid trip to Saint Petersburg, Russia, where he is to give a speech. Tensions boil over when their Russian airliner is stuck on the ground for an entire day, with all the passengers left aboard. With their relationship strained to the breaking point, Joel surprisingly proposes to Maggie, and she accepts, though they later decide to live together first. Maurice tries to mold his cousin's son (from the white trash side of the family) into the heir apparent of his business empire. Chris struggles to get inside electricity artistically.
95	8	"Up River"	Michael Fresco	Diane Frolov & Andrew Schneider	November 14, 1994	18.2
Joel settles down in Manonash, a small, remote native village with no electricity or running water, after paddling upriver for a house call. When Maurice sends Ed to bring him back, Joel explains why he is staying. Chris gets a life lesson when he hires an unreliable contractor to upgrade his trailer. Ruth-Anne resents being deeply in love with Walt.
96	9	"Sons of the Tundra"	Michael Vittes	Jeff Melvoin	November 28, 1994	18.6
Cicely welcomes Phil and Michelle Capra, the new doctor and his wife, fresh from Los Angeles. Holling wants to join the prestigious Sons of the Tundra men's club to cultivate business contacts, but Shelly is displeased by its exclusion of women. Ed can see a little bit into the future after eating a trout which he thinks was actually Raven, a mythological trickster and shapeshifter. Joel makes a brief appearance to trade for a hunting knife.
97	10	"Realpolitik"	Victor Lobl	Sam Egan	December 12, 1994	18.1
Maggie is elected mayor, but encounters resistance from most of her council against her first proposal. Chris has an unexpected reaction to her new status. Joel invites Phil for a round of golf, but has an ulterior motive. Marilyn buys a retired sled dog, but her dog breeding venture is a flop.
98	11	"The Great Mushroom"	James Hayman	Diane Frolov & Andrew Schneider	January 4, 1995	13.8
Maggie visits Joel in Manonash on his birthday, feeling guilty that she may have driven him away from Cicely. Joel reassures her that she is not responsible for his decision, but she envisions him dying in unusual ways, like her other boyfriends. The Capras get more than they bargained for when they host a dinner party.
99	12	"Mi Casa, Su Casa"	Daniel Attias	Mitchell Burgess & Robin Green	January 11, 1995	13.6
Marilyn travels to Manonash for a potlatch, causing Joel to revert to his old ways and to question if he has really changed. Maurice leaves Ed to house sit while he goes on a hunting trip. Shelly and Holling go looking for their first house, but Holling is uncomfortable with the idea.
100	13	"Horns"	Michael Fresco	Jeff Melvoin	January 18, 1995	15.3
Maurice's newest venture, bottled Cicely Water, causes some unusual gender role reversal effects. Joel learns that he is free of his contract and can leave Alaska. Mental hospital escapee and violinist Cal Ingraham is depressed without an audience.
101	14	"The Mommy's Curse"	Michael Lange	Mitchell Burgess & Robin Green	February 1, 1995	12.2
Walt tries working for Ruth-Anne; it does not work out, but he ends up moving in with her anyway. When her mother's boyfriend dies, Maggie is convinced there's a family curse. Holling's new friendship with Phil has Maurice seething with jealousy.
102	15	"The Quest"	Michael Vittes	Diane Frolov & Andrew Schneider	February 8, 1995	16.2
Joel drags Maggie along on a search for the mythical Jeweled City of the North on an isolated island. He finds the city, which turns out to be surprisingly familiar to him. He and Maggie part ways, and this is Joel's last appearance in the series. Chris sues Dr. Capra for medical malpractice. Michelle is asked to write a food review of The Brick for an Alaskan restaurant guide, but Holling and Shelly find out.
103	16	"Lucky People"	Janet Greek	Diane Frolov & Andrew Schneider	February 15, 1995	12.7
Phil and Michelle come to the realization that they are stuck in a place they hate. Maggie and Chris restore Roslyn and Cicely's Ford Model T for the Founders' Day parade. Maurice goes on a buying spree for Holling and Shelly's baby when he believes the baby the reincarnation of his dead uncle Elvy.
104	17	"The Graduate"	James Hayman	Sam Egan	March 8, 1995	11.9
Maggie learns the harsh realities of running a business when she buys the local movie theater and hires Ed and Heather Haines. Chris has to deal with two professors with profoundly different philosophies in his quest for a master's degree in Comparative Literature. Patrick Dulac stops by on his way to Kyoto. Holling has been sending money monthly for 25 years to help support him and his mother, leading Patrick to believe that Holling is his father.
105	18	"Little Italy"	Stephen Cragg	Jeff Melvoin	March 15, 1995	11.0
Italian-American Phil is delighted to discover Cicely has a Little Italy, but then becomes embroiled in a petty vendetta between two of its four families. As mayor, Maggie finds she is obligated to provide marriage counseling to Holling and Shelly. After Ruth-Anne is interviewed on the National Public Radio show All Things Considered, her success proves to be a burden.
106	19	"Balls"	Scott Paulin	Jeff Melvoin	April 6, 1995	8.6
Against the backdrop of Cicely's defense of its bowling league championship, Michelle leaves Phil after an argument and moves into Holling and Shelly's spare room. Lester Haines offers to finance Ed's film if Ed will stop seeing his daughter Heather. In trying to get Maggie to bowl with a partner, Chris finds himself attracted to Maggie.
107	20	"Buss Stop"	Daniel Attias	Mitchell Burgess & Robin Green	April 24, 1995	12.3
Michelle tries hard to stage the play Bus Stop. Ron bribes her to give an important part to longtime aspiring actor Erick, Shelly resents not being cast as Cheri, and Chris has a problem with kissing Maggie in rehearsals.
108	21	"Ursa Minor"	Patrick McKee	Sam Egan	July 12, 1995	7.9
Ed becomes a surrogate parent to a rambunctious bear cub. Chris uses lucid dreaming to try to work through relationship issues regarding Maggie, but his dreams do not cooperate. Maurice becomes concerned when the population of Cicely drops (from 623 to 607). Michelle tentatively reconciles with Phil.
109	22	"Let's Dance"	Michael Vittes	Sam Egan	July 19, 1995	7.0
Cal turns himself in. As Officer Barbara Semanski and Maurice drive him back to the state hospital, she starts to fall for him. Marilyn teaches cotillion and manners. Phil commits several social blunders, so he attends her class, as does Chris.
110	23	"Tranquility Base (Our Town)"	Michael Fresco	Mitchell Burgess & Robin Green & Jeff Melvoin	July 26, 1995	9.3
Maurice invites his friends to spend the weekend at his new summer lodge, "Tranquility Base". All does not go smoothly, however. Michelle's inability to make decisions wears on Phil, and she receives a visit from Joel's puzzled Rabbi Schulman. Chris regrets breaking up with Maggie. Maurice plans to propose to Barbara, but her behavior towards his other guests forces him to intervene, endangering their relationship.

== Ratings ==
Northern Exposure : U.S. viewers per episode (millions)

Season	Episode number																								
Season	1	2	3	4	5	6	7	8	9	10	11	12	13	14	15	16	17	18	19	20	21	22	23	24	25
1	13.5	14.2	12.9	13.3	13.2	13.7	14.4	13.0	–																
2	19.7	18.5	17.5	13.4	17.3	15.9	18.6	–																	
3	23.5	22.5	22.2	21.8	20.4	21.8	21.4	20.9	21.2	23.3	23.5	23.1	23.1	23.3	21.5	21.6	21.3	25.5	26.9	21.4	23.4	23.5	22.7	–	
4	24.9	22.2	21.9	21.7	22.9	19.4	19.8	21.6	22.0	21.5	22.9	23.4	22.7	24.0	20.8	25.0	21.4	21.9	20.8	22.2	21.5	19.7	17.3	18.3	20.1
5	21.3	20.7	20.4	20.6	18.6	19.3	16.1	21.2	19.2	19.4	20.7	20.2	23.2	22.4	22.6	20.7	21.8	20.0	19.8	20.1	18.4	14.6	19.7	14.3	–
6	16.6	18.8	17.6	18.2	18.6	15.8	18.1	18.2	18.6	18.1	13.8	13.6	15.3	12.2	16.2	12.7	11.9	11.0	8.6	12.3	7.9	7.0	9.3	–	

Audience measurement performed by Nielsen Media Research
