= Merrilyn =

Merrilyn is a feminine given name. It is similar to Merilyn and Marilyn.

== List of people with the name ==
- Merrilyn Gann (born 1963), Canadian actress
- Merrilyn Goos, Australian mathematician
- Merrilyn Rose (born 1955), Australian politician
- Anne Merrilyn Tolley (born 1953), New Zealand politician
