= List of Northern Exposure characters =

The following are fictional characters who appeared in Northern Exposure, an American television series which originally aired on CBS from July 1990 to July 1995.

== Main characters ==
Joel Fleischman
Joel (Rob Morrow) is the central character at the beginning of the series, a young, somewhat uptight Jewish doctor from Flushing, Queens (New York City) who is contractually bound to practice in the remote Alaskan town of Cicely for four years to repay a student loan from the government. The comedy centered originally on the clash between Fleischman's petty and neurotic, almost Woody Allen-like, urban mindset and the easy-going, community-minded people around him. The role receded somewhat in importance by season four, as behind the scenes Morrow was involved in contentious contract negotiations, and Fleischman's character was minimized or even entirely absent for some later episodes. Frustrated at the lack of growth for the character and willing to take on film offers (such as Quiz Show), Morrow left the series in the middle of the sixth (and final) season.
Maurice J. Minnifield
Maurice (Barry Corbin) is a macho, patriotic ex-astronaut and millionaire entrepreneur, owner of the local radio station KBHR and newspaper, as well as fifteen thousand acres (60 km²) of local land and head of Cicely's chamber of commerce. Acting as the town's unofficial mayor, he is determined to make tiny Cicely the next boomtown, on "the cusp of the new Alaskan Riviera," Maurice arranges to bring Dr. Fleischman to the town, which previously had no permanent physician. In season 3, Maurice is visited by a South Korean man who turns out to be his son (Yung Duk Won) that he fathered during his deployment in South Korea in the 1950s as a Marine, who in turn has his own son (Yung Bong Joo) that makes Maurice a grandfather.
Christopher Danforth Stevens
Chris (John Corbett) is the disc jockey at KBHR, conceptual sculptor, and an ex-convict who spent most of his prison time reading, a fact which makes him one of the most well-educated people in Cicely. He intersperses the music of his morning show with philosophical musings on the nature of life and readings from such writers as Walt Whitman, William Shakespeare, Leo Tolstoy, Carl Jung, and Maurice Sendak (Where the Wild Things Are). Chris is also Cicely's only clergyman, ordained as a minister in the Universal Life Church through an advertisement in Rolling Stone magazine. As radio host "Chris in the Morning", he serves as the de facto narrator for the show.
Mary Margaret "Maggie" O'Connell
Maggie (Janine Turner) is a professional bush pilot, property agent and Fleischman's landlord. She was a debutante from a wealthy Irish American family in Grosse Pointe, Michigan. She is wary of having relationships with men because all five of her former boyfriends died in bizarre accidents while in the prime of life. However, she falls for Mike Monroe (Anthony Edwards), a lawyer who is hyper-allergic to many man-made substances; in a reversal of her prior track record, he recovers completely and leaves. An ardent feminist, Maggie has a screwball, love-hate relationship with Fleischman, including the occasional sexual episode.
Shelly Marie Tambo Vincoeur
Shelly (Cynthia Geary) is a young beauty pageant winner, Miss Northwest Passage, with a somewhat 'surfer dude' shallow-but-sweet personality, who comes from Saskatoon, Saskatchewan. She is brought to Cicely by Maurice, who had hoped to marry her. Shortly after her arrival, she met and fell in love with the much older (by 44 years) Holling Vincoeur. Shelly nearly becomes a bigamist when she almost marries Holling before divorcing minor league hockey player Wayne Jones (Brandon Douglas), whom she had married solely to get him to stop proposing.
Holling Gustav Vincoeur
Holling (John Cullum) is a sexagenarian hunter and owner of The Brick bar and restaurant, where he lives upstairs with Shelly. Born in Québec (or the Yukon; both are mentioned in different seasons) and later becoming a naturalized US citizen, he had been best friends with Maurice until they had a falling out over Shelly. His father and grandfather both lived to be over 100 years old, spending most of their lives as widowers despite marrying much younger women; fearing the same bitter fate, Holling had sworn off love until Shelly appeared. He claims to be a direct descendant of King Louis XIV of France and attempts to distance himself as much as possible from his despotic ancestors, all despicable people. After 23 years as unelected mayor of Cicely, he loses that post to Edna Hancock, who runs against him because of a grudge, in the town's very first election in 1992.
Ed Chigliak
Ed (Darren E. Burrows) is a mild-mannered, amiably tactless half-Native Alaskan who was abandoned as a young child and raised by the local Tlingits. He works for Maurice and later part-time at Ruth-Anne's general store. A film buff and would-be director, he is occasionally visited by his invisible spirit guide, One-Who-Waits. In season 5, he becomes a shaman-in-training and is thus visited by a personal demon, a dwarf who embodies Ed's low self-esteem (a development that Burrows later expressed his disapproval over). Ed writes, directs, and produces his own film about Cicely and another film about a fellow Native American's traditional handicraft while later organizing a Tlingit-dub of The Prisoner of Zenda.
Ruth-Anne Miller
Ruth-Anne (Peg Phillips) is the septuagenarian owner of the general store who moved to Cicely thirty years earlier from Portland, Oregon. A widow, she lives alone until late in the series, when she becomes involved with Walt Kupfer (see below). Like Holling, she is one of the more rational/balanced characters and always has an open ear for her customers' personal problems. She too is a film buff and has earnest conversations with Ed on this topic.
Marilyn Whirlwind
Marilyn (Elaine Miles) is Fleischman's Native Alaskan receptionist. Preternaturally patient and imperturbable, Marilyn speaks sparingly, while her boss rarely stops talking. She occasionally offers up wisdom in the form of a Native American folk legend in response to another Cicelian who is troubled about some issue.
Phil Capra
Phil (Paul Provenza) is recruited as town physician after Fleischman takes to the wilderness. A refugee from Los Angeles, Capra is more gracious than Fleischman in a small town setting, but even more hapless. The character of Phil Capra was introduced in the show's final season, with a few of his first scenes being in the last episode with Morrow as star.
Michelle Schowdowski Capra
Michelle (Teri Polo) is Phil's wife. She is a writer for publications such as in-flight airline magazines. She gets work as a reporter for a newspaper owned by Maurice Minnifield, but when Maurice starts applying editorial pressure, she decides she prefers waitressing at the Brick. For a time, she has visions of Fleischman's rabbi, Schulman. The character of Michelle Schowdowski Capra was introduced in the show's final season.

== Recurring characters ==
Adam
Adam (Adam Arkin) is an abrasive, ungroomed, misanthropic, bilious, cantankerous and colorful "genius" gourmet chef who may or may not have worked for the CIA in the past, which may explain how he has so much information about everyone. He lives off the grid and in the woods, and was first introduced as a mythic legend figure, something akin to Bigfoot. People in Cicely spoke of him as a tall-tale figure at first. Adam usually has a chip on his shoulder and offers an offensive rebuttal to anyone who compliments him. He is married to Eve. Arkin directed one of the episodes in the fourth season.
Dave
Dave is the cheerful Native American cook at the Brick. In early episodes, he has few lines, but his role expands in later seasons, particularly in scenes with Holling and Shelly, but also with Joel, who often asks him to explain local Native American customs. Dave and Shelly appear to get along particularly well, likely because of their similarly friendly personalities. He was initially portrayed by Buffalo Child in the episode "Sex, Lies, and Ed's Tape", and thereafter by William J. White.
Eugene
Eugene (Earl Quewezance) replaced Dave as the cook at the Brick near the end of the fifth season.
Earl the Barber
Earl is a frequent background extra played by Jerry Morris, the real owner of the barbershop that appears in the show.
Eve
Eve (Valerie Mahaffey) is the hypochondriacal heiress to a tungsten fortune; she is also Adam's wife and a Christian Scientist. She was first introduced in the season three episode "The Bumpy Road to Love", where a house call by Joel leads to an argument between Adam and her. Mahaffey won an Emmy Award in 1992 for her portrayal of Eve during that season. Eve and Adam spend part of each year as jet-setters and part as near-hermits in a cabin near Cicely; the two decide to marry after Eve becomes pregnant (having spent 12 years together), which leads to strife when Adam finds out she is very wealthy. She tries to back out of the wedding (which goes through anyway). She and Adam eventually have a child they name Aldridge.
Lester Haines
Lester (Apesanahkwat) is the fourth wealthiest man in the interior (and as a Haida, the first native to crack the top five). He is regarded as a rival by the wealthiest, Maurice. His daughter Heather Haines is briefly Ed Chigliak's love interest.
Erick Reese Hillman and Ron Bantz
Erick (Don McManus) and Ron (Doug Ballard) are a gay couple who (at the end of season two) buy a house from Maurice in order to open an upscale bed and breakfast called the Sourdough Inn. They are married by Chris late in the fifth season.
Caldecott "Cal" E. Ingraham
Cal (Simon Templeman) is a violinist who becomes so obsessed with a valuable antique violin purchased by Maurice that he attempts to kill Maurice. He reappears in several episodes.
Hayden Keyes
Hayden (James L. Dunn) is Cicely's blacksmith by trade and a firewood salesman, in addition to performing other odd jobs. He is well liked, but has a shady past and is not above stealing and trying an insurance scam.
Walter "Walt" Kupfer
Walt (Moultrie Patten) is a rugged but friendly fur trapper, and love interest of Ruth-Anne Miller in later seasons. He was addicted to his work as a stockbroker in New York City and retired to Cicely on the advice of his doctor "more than 30 years" ago.
Mike Monroe
Mike (Anthony Edwards) is a hyper-allergic lawyer turned climate activist. He is initially nicknamed "The Bubble Man" by the citizens of Cicely. Mike comes to Alaska to escape the pollution that gave him multiple chemical sensitivity. Maggie O'Connell, attracted by Mike's show of courage in battling his illness, encourages him to come out of his airtight house more often, and they briefly become a couple. In an apparent inversion of "Maggie's Curse," Mike's symptoms suddenly vanish, whereupon he leaves town to join a Greenpeace ship at Murmansk, much to Maggie's disappointment.
One-Who-Waits
One-Who-Waits (Floyd Westerman) is Ed Chigliak's spirit guide, the ghost of a long-dead chief from Ed's Native American Bear clan.
Richard "Rick" Pederson
Rick (Grant Goodeve) is Maggie O'Connell's first-season boyfriend. He dies at the end of the second season when an errant satellite falls on him during a camping trip. After his death, it is revealed that he was a compulsive sex addict who cheated on Maggie with hundreds of other women. In one episode after Rick's death, Maggie encounters one of them face-to-face where they discuss Rick's relational complexities.
Leonard Quinhagak
Leonard (Graham Greene) is a native medicine man, Marilyn's cousin and Ed's mentor. He is also the local totem pole carver, which is featured in an episode where he creates a totem for the Whirlwind family, which rekindles a long-running feud between the Raven and Bear clans.
Elaine Schulman
Elaine (Jessica Lundy) is Joel Fleishman's fiancée/ex-fiancée. She is first heard in an outgoing message on an answering machine, and first appears in the season 1 episode "Russian Flu", when she visits Joel in Cicely. After breaking up with Joel by letter in order to marry a retired judge, she visits Joel again after the death of her husband in the season 3 episode "Roots".
Rabbi Schulman
Schulman (Jerry Adler) is Joel's rabbi from New York City. He inexplicably appears to Joel in "visions"—and also once to Michelle Capra.
Sergeant Barbara Semanski
Barbara (Diane Delano) is a rugged Alaska state trooper and gun enthusiast, and the on-again/off-again love interest of Maurice Minnifield. She is a no-nonsense law enforcement officer who is very particular about enforcing each and every law. When she learns that Maurice cheats on his income tax return, she leaves him. She does the same when she finds he is harboring a fugitive; and even arrests Maurice for a minor offense.
Bernard Stevens
Bernard (Richard Cummings Jr.) is Chris's "half-brother and spiritual doppelgänger." Their father was a bigamist "travelling man" (a reference to the Ricky Nelson song "Travelin' Man") whose double life was exposed only after his death. Their relationship extends beyond being merely half-brothers, as they also share dreams, emotions, and thoughts. They have the same birthday and birth year, making them "twins," despite having different mothers, one white and the other black.
