= Moultrie Patten =

American musician and actor

- Born: June 10, 1919
- Died: March 18, 2009 (aged 89); Beaverton, Oregon, US
- Education: Brown University
- Occupation(s): Actor, jazz musician

Moultrie Patten (June 10, 1919 – March 18, 2009) was an American actor and jazz musician. Patten was perhaps best known for his role as Walt the trapper on the American television series Northern Exposure, which aired from 1990 until 1995. Patten appeared as Walt Kupfer from 1993 until the show's ending in 1995.

== Early life ==
Moultrie Patten was born on June 10, 1919. He was raised in Detroit, Michigan, where he worked at a local theater and studied the piano. Patten attended Brown University, where he continued to pursue acting.

He was drafted into the United States military during World War II. He served as a tank commander during the Battle of Monte Cassino, for which he received a Silver Star for heroism in 1944.

== Career ==
Patten moved to New York City following the end of World War II to pursue his acting career. He spent more than fifty years performing in Broadway theater, regional theater, film, television, and even vaudeville. Patten once described his favorite theater roles as The Hostage, The Andersonville Trial, and Noises Off.

Patten's earliest television credits included Route 66, The Philco Television Playhouse and Hallmark Hall of Fame. His film roles included The Temp, Free Willy and The Favor.

Patten moved to Portland, Oregon, in 1990, and later relocated to Beaverton, Oregon. He was cast as Walt Kupfer on the hit television show Northern Exposure, from 1993 until 1995. Fans of Northern Exposure still sought out Patten for his autograph years after the show's production ended in 1995.

Patten continued acting, especially in television commercials, into his 80s. He also pursued a career as a jazz musician and played the piano at jazz clubs throughout the Midwest and East Coast. Patten released a CD featuring his favorite recordings in 1997.

== Death ==
Patten died from pneumonia in Beaverton, Oregon, on March 18, 2009, at the age of 89. He was survived by his daughter, Sarah Goforth; sons, Moultrie Patten Jr. and Henry Bigelow Patten (aka Rex Alexander); a sister, Jane Dias; and his former wife, Teena Patten.

Patten's funeral was held at the Ross Hollywood Chapel in Portland, Oregon, on March 27, 2009. He was buried at Arlington National Cemetery with full military honors on May 28, 2009.

In an interview with The Oregonian following his death, Patten's daughter, Sarah Goforth, explained her father's acting philosophy saying, "Anyone who pursues the arts is really creating another world for themselves, because the one they are faced with does not, in some way, suit them."

== Filmography ==
=== Film ===
Year	Title	Role	Notes
1984	Nothing Lasts Forever	Skylounge Pianist	
1993	The Temp	Wait	
1993	Free Willy	Homeless Man	
1994	The Favor	Peter's Cabbie	
2000	Blast	Ed	

=== Television ===
Year	Title	Role	Notes
1952	Hallmark Hall of Fame	Francis Harrison / Fleming	2 episodes
1953	The Philco Television Playhouse	1st Announcer	Episode: "0 for 37"
1956	Appointment with Adventure	Professor / Mr. Stone	2 episodes
1961	'Way Out	George Carver	Episode: "Dissolve to Black"
1963	Route 66	Attorney	Episode: "The Cage Around Maria"
1977	Great Performances	Cavalry orderly	Episode: "Secret Service"
1988	Miami Vice	Grover Watkins	Episode: "Vote of Confidence"
1991	Deception: A Mother's Secret	Ivey	Television film
1993	Better Off Dead	Judge Peter Lindsey	Television film
1993–1995	Northern Exposure	Walt Kupfer	39 episodes
1999	Love Is Strange	Mr. Otto	Television film
