= Merilyn =

Merilyn is a feminine given name.

== List of people with the given name ==
- Merilyn Gómez Pozos (born 1981), Mexican politician
- Merilyn Phillips (born 1957), Caymanian former cyclist
- Merilyn Simonds (born 1949), Canadian writer
- Merilyn Wiseman (1941– 2019), New Zealand potter

== List of people with the middle name ==
- Jean Merilyn Simmons (1929–2010), British actress and singer

== See also ==
- Marilyn (given name)
- Merrilyn
- Merlin
