= Northern Exposure =

American comedy-drama television series

- Genre: Comedy drama Medical drama
- Created by: Joshua Brand; John Falsey
- Starring: Rob Morrow; Barry Corbin; Janine Turner; John Cullum; Darren E. Burrows; John Corbett; Cynthia Geary; Elaine Miles; Peg Phillips; Paul Provenza; Teri Polo
- Theme music composer: David Schwartz
- Country of origin: United States
- Original language: English
- No. of seasons: 6
- No. of episodes: 110 (list of episodes)

Production
- Executive producers: Joshua Brand; John Falsey; David Chase; Diane Frolov; Andrew Schneider
- Camera setup: Single-camera
- Running time: 45 minutes
- Production companies: Cine-Nevada Productions (season 1); Finnegan-Pinchuk Productions (seasons 2–6); Falahey/Austin Street Productions (seasons 1–3); Brand/Falsey Productions (seasons 4–6); Universal Television

Original release
- Network: CBS
- Release: July 12, 1990 – July 26, 1995

Northern Exposure is an American comedy-drama television series that originally aired on CBS from July 12, 1990, to July 26, 1995, with a total of 110 episodes. The series follows the eccentric residents in the fictitious town of Cicely, Alaska. Rob Morrow starred as New York City native Dr. Joel Fleischman, whose med school tuition was underwritten by the government of Alaska in exchange for him practicing medicine for four years in the state.

In the first episode, the newly graduated doctor is shocked to learn that instead of being assigned to a modern hospital in Anchorage as he had expected, he is being sent to the remote town of Cicely to serve as the area's only general practitioner. The first season was centered around Fleischman's fish-out-of-water experiences in rural Alaska and his attempts to get out of his contract. As the series progressed, it developed into more of an ensemble show, with episodes focused on other residents of the town.

Northern Exposure received 57 award nominations during its six-season run and won 27, including the 1992 Primetime Emmy Award for Outstanding Drama Series, two additional Primetime Emmy Awards, four Creative Arts Emmy Awards, and two Golden Globes.

== History ==
The series was created by Joshua Brand and John Falsey, who also created the award-winning shows St. Elsewhere and I'll Fly Away, in addition to the show A Year in the Life. It started as a mid-season replacement summer series on CBS in 1990 with eight episodes. It returned for seven more episodes in spring 1991, then became a regular part of the network's schedule in 1991–92. It ranked among the top 10 viewed by 18- to 49-year-olds, and was part of the network's 1992–93 and 1993–94 schedules.

In 1994, writer Sandy Veith won a lawsuit against Universal, alleging that the series was based on an idea he conceived for which he received no credit or compensation. Veith subsequently won $10 million in damages and legal fees on appeal three years later. The Los Angeles Times reported that Brand and Falsey were not included in the allegations and that jurors seemed to believe the studio brought the basic concept for the show to them rather than that they knowingly stole Veith's idea. Veith's original idea was about an Italian-American doctor who moves to a small town in the South. In 1994, the same year that the lawsuit was filed, Brand and Falsey resigned. David Chase was brought in to serve as executive producer. He later went on to say that he took the job purely for the money, stating that he disliked the premise of the show; Brand cited Chase as having run the show into the ground.

In January 1995, the show moved from Monday to Wednesday, and in May 1995 there was a gap during sweeps when CBS broadcast other programming. At one point, Barry Corbin wrote an open letter to TV critics that called the show "an understandably weakened show". On May 24, 1995, CBS announced the cancelation of the show, which had its final episode shown on July 26. "The show had a lot of life in it, and the move (Wednesday at 10pm) killed it," said executive producer Andrew Schneider. "This piddling out is sad."

Morrow and his representatives spent much of seasons 4 and 5 lobbying for an improved contract, and intermittently threatened to leave the show. Universal Television sued him in 1992 after he refused to show up on set to in protest. Morrow decided to leave the show in 1994. The producers responded by reducing Fleischman's role in the storylines, and introducing characters such as Mike Monroe (season 4) and Dr. Phil Capra (season 6) to partially compensate for the absence of Morrow, whose last appearance came midway through the show's final season.

== Cast and characters ==
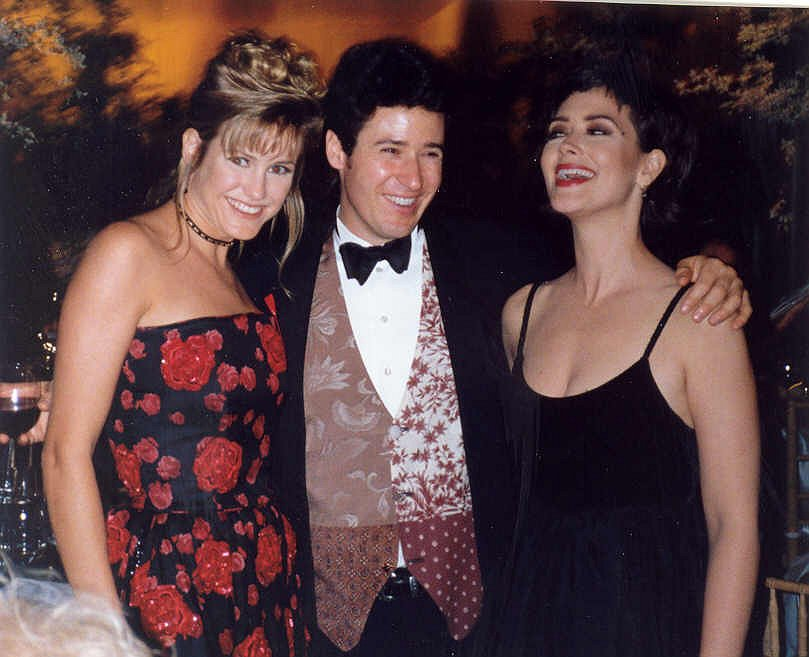
Left to right: Cynthia Geary, Rob Morrow, and Janine Turner at the 1993 Emmy Awards

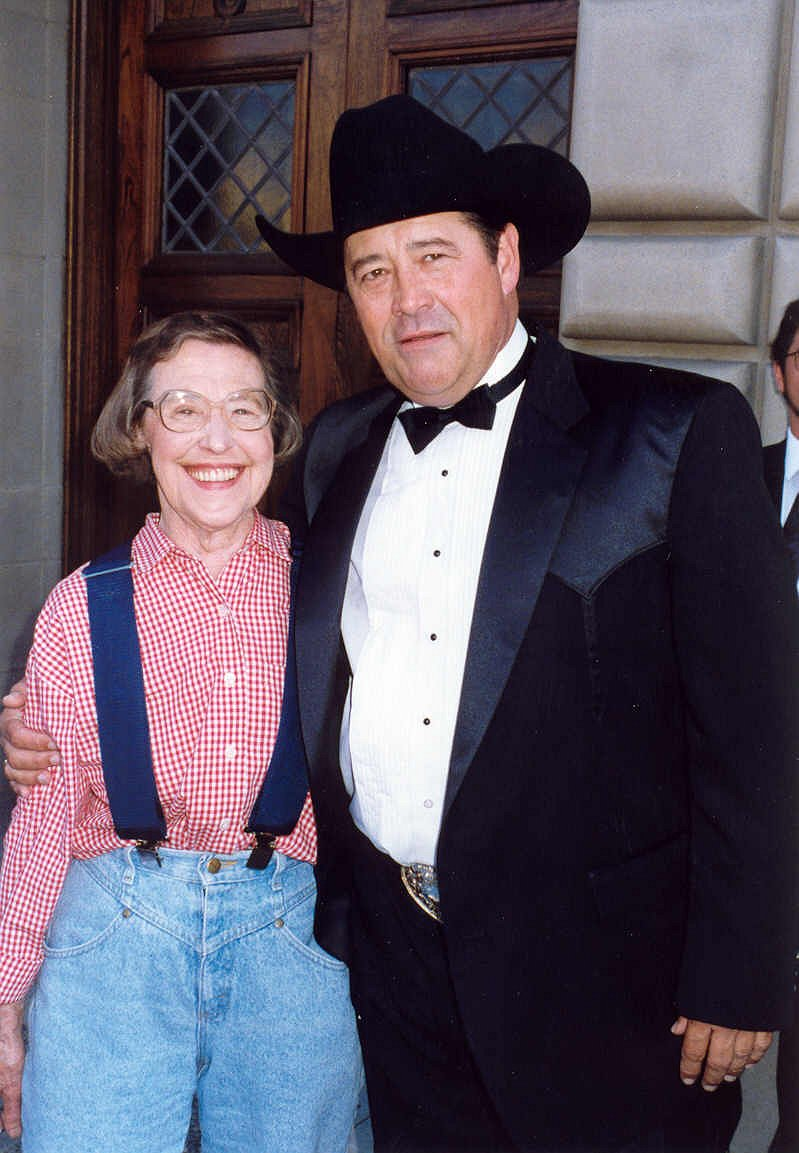
Peg Phillips and Barry Corbin at the 1993 Emmy Awards

- Joel Fleischman (Rob Morrow) is a neurotic young Jewish physician from New York City. Fresh out of family medicine residency, he is legally contracted to practice medicine for four years in Alaska according to the terms of a student loan underwritten by the state. Expecting to work in a relatively large, modern hospital in Anchorage, he is unexpectedly reassigned to be a general practitioner in the small town of Cicely, where he is a proverbial fish out of water. His struggles to adjust to the very unfamiliar environment drive the plot of many episodes, especially in the early seasons. Morrow left the show midway through its final season due to a contract dispute. His character's departure was handled by having him "go native", abandoning Cicely for a remote fishing village and embracing the wilderness in a search for spiritual enlightenment.
- Maurice Minnifield (Barry Corbin) is a multi-millionaire businessman, Korean War fighter pilot and astronaut who moved to the area after retiring from the military in the 1970s. Maurice owns Cicely's newspaper and radio station, along with over 15,000 acres (61 km^{2}) of land which he hopes to develop into the "Alaskan Riviera". It is Maurice who arranged to bring Joel to the town, which previously did not have a physician. Beneath a thin veneer of gentility, he is pompous, overbearing, and bigoted, leading to conflicts with other residents, such as the gay couple Ron and Eric. Despite his demeanor, Maurice can be generous, and he aids almost every other major character in some way during the show's run. Before the timeline of the series, he had brought the much younger Shelly Tambo to Cicely with the intention of marrying her, but she ended up marrying his best friend Holling Vincoeur instead.
- Maggie O'Connell (Janine Turner) is a tomboyish Grosse Pointe, Michigan-born debutante turned Alaska bush pilot. Maggie and Joel quickly develop a love-hate relationship, with their opposing views on most subjects coupled with unacknowledged attraction resulting in sexual tension in the early seasons. Later in the show's run they become romantically involved and agree (briefly) to marry. It is their breakup that is the impetus for Joel to leave Cicely during the last season. A running theme through the series is that nearly all of Maggie's romantic partners die in bizarre ways (one is struck by a falling satellite), leading others to wonder if she suffers from an "O'Connell curse". Only two boyfriends escape this fate: Joel and Mike Monroe, who is hyperallergic to most things but, in a reversal of the curse, is cured.
- Holling Vincoeur (John Cullum) is the Canadian-born sexagenarian owner and operator of The Brick, a popular bar and restaurant, and mayor at the beginning of the show. He and Maurice are old friends, though their relationship was strained at one time by their shared romantic interest in Shelly Tambo, whom Holling married. Though over 40 years older than Shelly, he fears that he will outlive her, as the men in his family tend to live well past 100 and spend their final years as heartbroken widowers.
- Shelly Tambo (Cynthia Geary) is another Canadian expatriate and former Miss Northwest Passage, originally from Saskatoon. 18-years-old at the beginning of season one, she was brought to Cicely by Maurice, who had hoped to marry her. Instead, she chose Holling and became a waitress at The Brick. Though seemingly naive and flighty, she regularly shows flashes of unexpected wisdom. It was planned for the character to be a Native American until Geary was cast.
- Chris Stevens (John Corbett) is a philosophical free spirit and ex-convict who hails from West Virginia and works as the disc jockey at the radio station. Between songs, Chris comments on events in Cicely and on more intellectual and controversial subjects, often leading to conflict with Maurice, who fires and rehires him several times over the course of the series. The first of these conflicts comes when Chris reads Walt Whitman's Leaves of Grass over the air and mentions that Whitman was gay, causing an infuriated Maurice to storm into the studio to punch and fire him. Chris is also a nondenominational clergyman and occasionally officiates at weddings.
- Ed Chigliak (Darren E. Burrows) is a young, mild-mannered, half-native Alaskan foundling raised by local Tlingits. Ed does odd jobs for Maurice and works part-time at the local general store. He is a film buff and aspiring movie director.
- Ruth-Anne Miller (Peg Phillips) is the elderly, level-headed owner of the local general store and a 30-year resident of Cicely. A widow, Ruth-Anne lives alone until late in the series, when she becomes involved with Walt Kupfer, a fur trapper and retired stockbroker. She too is a film buff and, along with Holling, a keen birder. She has two adult sons, one of whom is a stockbroker. He comes to see her in one episode.
- Marilyn Whirlwind (Elaine Miles) is an Alaska Native (Tlingit) and she works as Joel's receptionist. Her few words and exceptionally placid demeanor are a strong contrast to her employer's loquaciousness and high-strung temperament.

In the show's last season, two new characters were introduced to fill the void left by Morrow's departure:

- Phil Capra (Paul Provenza), a doctor from Los Angeles who is recruited as Joel's replacement after Joel takes to the wilderness.
- Michelle Schowdowski Capra (Teri Polo), Phil's wife. She also works as a reporter for a newspaper owned by Maurice.

Major recurring characters include:

- Rick Pederson (Grant Goodeve), Maggie's pilot boyfriend who is killed by a falling satellite
- Lester Haines (Apesanahkwat), a native millionaire
- Walt Kupfer (Moultrie Patten), an ex-Wall Street broker turned pelt hunter
- Mike Monroe (Anthony Edwards), an environmental activist with multiple chemical sensitivity
- Bernard Stevens (Richard Cummings Jr.), Chris's African-American half-brother and "spiritual doppelgänger"
- Leonard Quinhagak (Graham Greene), a local shaman and Marilyn's cousin
- Barbara Semanski (Diane Delano), Local officer for the Alaska State Troopers and Maurice's love interest
- Erick Reese Hillman (Don McManus) and Ronald Arthur Bantz (Doug Ballard), a gay couple arrive and set up a business in Cicely. They eventually marry.
- Adam (Adam Arkin), an abrasive, belligerent, poorly-groomed master chef who continually tells outrageous stories about himself. The show is deliberately obscure as to when he is lying or his stories are true
- Eve (Valerie Mahaffey), Adam's hypochondriac and very wealthy wife. Mahaffey was the only actor from the series to win a Primetime Emmy Award.
- Dave the Cook (William J. White), a cook at the Brick
- Eugene (Earl Quewezance), a cook at the Brick (replaced Dave in Season 5)

== Production ==
In Season 6, Episode 15, Joel mails a post card to Maggie from Manhattan, and the zip code of Cicely is shown to be 99729, which serves a part of Denali Borough including the town of Cantwell.

However, most filming locations were in Roslyn, Washington. "Northern Exposure II" (the main production facility) was in Redmond, Washington, in what is now the headquarters of Genie Industries, behind a business park.

According to The Northern Exposure Book, the moose in the opening titles was named Mort and was provided by Washington State University, where he was part of a captive herd. To film the opening sequence, the crew fenced off Roslyn, set Mort loose, and lured him around with food.

== Episodes ==
Season	Episodes	Originally released		Rank	Rating
Season	Episodes	First released	Last released	Rank	Rating
1	8	July 12, 1990	August 30, 1990	N/A	N/A
2	7	April 8, 1991	May 20, 1991	N/A	N/A
3	23	September 23, 1991	May 18, 1992	16	15.5
4	25	September 28, 1992	May 24, 1993	11	15.2
5	24	September 20, 1993	May 23, 1994	14	14.4
6	23	September 19, 1994	July 26, 1995	41	11.2 (Tied with Hangin' with Mr. Cooper and Walker, Texas Ranger)

Notable episodes in the series include the pilot (nominated for an Emmy for Outstanding Writing), the third season's last episode, "Cicely" (which won a Peabody Award, three Creative Arts Emmy Awards, and a Directors Guild of America Award), and the fifth-season episode "I Feel the Earth Move", which featured the second same-sex marriage story arc on U.S. prime-time television. (Fox's Roc aired the first U.S. prime-time television episode depicting a same-sex marriage, "Can't Help Loving That Man", on October 20, 1991.)

== Reception ==
On Rotten Tomatoes, the first season of Northern Exposure has a score of 100% based on six reviews, with an average rating of 7.0/10. On Metacritic, which uses a weighted score, the first season is rated 80 based on seven reviews, indicating "generally favorable reviews," while the second season has an 83 based on nine, indicating "universal acclaim".

Entertainment Weekly’s Ken Tucker gave the first episode a B+, writing that the show “may well prove to be summer television’s most likably eccentric series”.

=== Ratings ===
- Season 1 (Thursday 10 pm): 12.4 rating (highest-rated episode: "A Kodiak Moment", 10.1 rating)
- Season 2 (Monday 10 pm): 15.5 rating (highest-rated episode: "Goodbye to All That", 13.9 rating)
- Season 3: 16.3 rating (highest-rated episode: "Wake Up Call", 19.6 rating/26 million viewers)
- Season 4: 15.8 rating (highest-rated episode: "Northwest Passages", 18.3 rating)
- Season 5: 14.5 rating (highest-rated episode: "A Bolt from the Blue", 16.2 rating)
- Season 6 (Monday at 10 pm; Wednesday at 9 pm): 11.2 rating (highest-rated episode: "Eye of the Beholder", 13.7 rating)

== Accolades ==
=== Emmy Awards ===
The cast and crew won seven Emmy Awards out of 39 nominations:

- Joshua Brand, John Falsey, et al., for Outstanding Drama Series (1992)
- Valerie Mahaffey, for Outstanding Supporting Actress in a Drama Series (1992)
- Andrew Schneider and Diane Frolov, for Outstanding Individual Achievement in Writing for a Drama Series for the episode "Seoul Mates" (1992)
- Thomas R. Moore, for Outstanding Individual Achievement in Editing for a Series for the episode "Cicely" (1992)
- Woody Crocker, Kenneth Berg and Gene Serdena, for Outstanding Individual Achievement in Art Direction for a Series for "Cicely" (1992)
- Frank Prinzi, for Outstanding Cinematography for a Series for "Cicely" (1992)
- William H. Angarola et al., for Outstanding Individual Achievement in Sound Editing for a Series for "Fish Story" (1994)

=== Golden Globe Awards ===
The series won two Golden Globe awards for Best Drama series, in 1992 and 1993. In addition, Morrow and Turner were each nominated three times consecutively from 1992 to 1994 for Best Actor and Actress, while Corbett was nominated in 1993 for his supporting role.

=== Peabody Awards ===
The series won a pair of consecutive Peabody Awards: in 1991–92 for the show's "depict[ion] in a comedic and often poetic way, [of] the cultural clash between a transplanted New York City doctor and the townspeople of fictional Cicely, Alaska" and its stories of "people of different backgrounds and experiences" clashing but who ultimately "strive to accept their differences and co-exist".

=== Additional awards and nominations ===
1995

- American Cinema Editors – Eddie nomination for Best Edited One-Hour Series for Television – Briana London – for episode "Lovers and Madmen"
- Environmental Media Awards, USA – Award for Ongoing Commitment – Josh Brand and John Falsey
- Screen Actors Guild Awards – Nomination for Outstanding Performance by an Ensemble in a Comedy Series

1994

- BMI TV Music Award: Northern Exposure – David Schwartz
- Casting Society of America, USA – Artios nomination for Best Casting for TV, Dramatic Episodic – Megan Branman

1993

- American Cinema Editors – Eddie nomination for Best Edited One-Hour Series for Television – Thomas R. Moore– for episode "Cicely"
- American Society of Cinematographers, USA – ASC Award nomination for Outstanding Achievement in Cinematography in Regular Series – Frank Prinzi
- BMI TV Music Award: Northern Exposure – David Schwartz
- Casting Society of America, USA – Artios nomination for Best Casting for TV, Dramatic Episodic – Megan Branman
- Directors Guild of America Award – Outstanding Directorial Achievement in Dramatic Shows – Night – for episode "Cicely"
  - Robert Loeser (second assistant director) (plaque)
  - Patrick McKee (first assistant director) (plaque)
  - Jack Terry (II) (unit production manager) (plaque)
  - Robert C. Thompson
- Directors Guild Award – Outstanding Directorial Achievement in Dramatic Shows – Night – for episode "Kaddish for Uncle Manny"
  - Michael Lange
- Electronic Media Critics Poll – Best Television Series
- Environmental Media Awards, USA – EMA Award TV Drama – for episode "Survival of the Species"
- Retirement Research Foundation, USA – Wise Owl Award – Honorable Mention Television and Theatrical Film Fiction – Joshua Brand (executive) John Falsey (executive) – for episode "Three Amigos"

1992

- BMI TV Music Award: Northern Exposure – David Schwartz
- Casting Society of America, USA – Artios for Best Casting for TV, Dramatic Episodic – Megan Branman and Patricia Carnes Kalles
- Electronic Media Critics Poll – Best Television Series
- Grammy Award nomination: "Theme From Northern Exposure" – David Schwartz
- Peabody Award – Presented to Falsey-Austin Street Productions for Northern Exposure, for presenting episodic drama on television with intelligence, sensitivity and humor
- PGA Golden Laurel Awards – Television Producer of the Year Award – Joshua Brand and John Falsey
- Retirement Research Foundation, USA – Wise Owl Award – Honorable Mention Television and Theatrical Film Fiction – Joshua Brand (executive), John Falsey (executive) – for episode "A Hunting We Will Go"
- Television Critics Association – Program of the Year
- Viewers for Quality Television – John Cullum, Best Supporting Actor in a Drama Series
- Viewers for Quality Television – Adam Arkin, Best Specialty Player
- Young Artist Awards – nomination for Best Young Actor Guest-Starring or Recurring Role in a TV Series – Grant Gelt, for episode "Goodbye to All That"

1991

- Casting Society of America, USA – Artios win for Best Casting for TV, Dramatic Pilot – Megan Branman, Patricia Carnes Kalles and Lynn Kressel
- Casting Society of America, USA – Artios nomination for Best Casting for TV, Dramatic Episodic – Megan Branman and Patricia Carnes Kalles
- Electronic Media Critics Poll – Best Television Series

== Soundtracks ==
- Northern Exposure: Music from the Television Series (USA, original soundtrack, 1992), MCA Records, Inc. MCAD-10685
- More Music from Northern Exposure (USA, 1994), MCA Records, Inc. MCAD-11077
- Ausgerechnet Alaska (German covers, 1992), distributed by IDEAL Vertrieb, Wichmannstr. 4, 2000 Hamburg 52 (out of print)

== Home media ==
=== DVD releases ===
Universal Studios Home Entertainment has released all six seasons on DVD in Regions 1, 2 and 4. The Region 1 DVD releases have caused controversy among the show's fans due to their high prices and the changes to the soundtrack introduced in order to lower their costs. The release of Season 1 contained the original music, but retailed for $60 due to the cost of music licensing. Subsequent seasons replaced most of the music with generic elevator-style music, resulting in a lower-cost release. The first and second seasons were also rereleased together in packaging that matches the third through sixth seasons. On July 21, 2020, Northern Exposure was rereleased by Shout! Factory, containing all 110 episodes but not with all original music. The Region 2 editions released in Germany on DVD contain all the original music.

DVD Name	Ep #	Release dates		
DVD Name	Ep #	Region 1	Region 2	Region 4
The Complete First Season	8	May 25, 2004	May 21, 2001	February 18, 2004
The Complete Second Season	7	November 30, 2004	May 9, 2005	July 13, 2005
The Complete Third Season	23	June 14, 2005	January 30, 2006	March 8, 2006
The Complete Fourth Season	25	March 28, 2006	July 31, 2006	September 20, 2006
The Complete Fifth Season	24	November 13, 2006	January 22, 2007	February 21, 2007
The Complete Sixth and Final Season	23	March 6, 2007	June 25, 2007	July 4, 2007
The Complete Series	110	November 13, 2007; July 21, 2020	October 8, 2007	November 11, 2009

=== Blu-ray releases ===
On March 19, 2018, Fabulous Films released the entire series on Blu-ray in the United Kingdom containing all original music. The US release followed on December 5, 2023, by Universal Studios with most original music but select cues replaced.

=== Streaming ===
As of January 2024, all six seasons of the series are now available on Amazon Prime Video with the majority of its original soundtrack.

== Potential revival ==
In 2016, Darren Burrows and his production company, Film Farms, held a crowdfunding campaign to fund a development project with the goal of creating more episodes. The working title for this project is "Northern Exposure: Home Again". Despite not meeting the original $100,000 goal, Burrows decided to continue with the project.

On June 17, 2016, Film Farms announced that writer David Assael had been hired to write for the project. He previously wrote several episodes, including "Russian Flu," "Spring Break," and "It Happened in Juneau," among others. The revival was originally envisioned as a two-hour "visit to Cicely," but a ten-episode series was reportedly being pitched to various network, cable, and streaming venues.

On November 20, 2018, it was reported that a revival series was in the early stages of development at CBS, with Brand, Falsey, and Morrow executive producing and Morrow again playing Fleischman. Corbett was named as producer but his appearance as a performer was not confirmed. Falsey died in January 2019, and on May 19, 2019, Josef Adalian, an editor for the New York City-based magazine Vulture, tweeted that CBS had canceled development work on the series. Adalian subsequently tweeted that the rights holder, Universal Studios, could pitch the revival elsewhere, but it was unclear whether the studio was planning to move the project to another outlet. Morrow, who was busy with other commitments, found out about Falsey's death on Twitter. On November 15, 2019, Morrow revealed in an interview on radio station WGN 720AM in Chicago that he and Brand were continuing revival efforts despite Falsey's death and CBS's decision.
