= How the West Was Fun =

1994 television film directed by Stuart Margolin

- Promotional poster for the video release
- Genre: Family; Western
- Written by: Jurgen Wolff
- Directed by: Stuart Margolin
- Starring: Mary-Kate Olsen; Ashley Olsen; Martin Mull; Patrick Cassidy; Peg Phillips
- Music by: Richard Bellis
- Country of origin: United States
- Original language: English

Production
- Executive producers: Allen S. Epstein; Jim Green
- Producers: Mark Bacino; Adria Later
- Cinematography: Richard Leiterman
- Editor: David Blangsted
- Running time: 96 minutes
- Production companies: Dualstar Productions; Green/Epstein Productions; Kicking Horse Productions Ltd. Warner Bros. Television

Original release
- Network: ABC
- Release: November 19, 1994

How the West Was Fun is a 1994 American contemporary western television film starring Mary-Kate and Ashley Olsen, with their sister Elizabeth in her film debut. The film premiered on ABC on November 19, 1994.

== Synopsis ==
Eight-year-old twins Jessica and Susie Martin live with their widowed father Stephen in Philadelphia. One day they receive a letter from their late mother Sarah's godmother, Natty, inviting Sarah to help at her struggling dude ranch. Unaware of Sarah's death, Natty seeks help to keep the ranch afloat. The girls convince their father to visit, though they accidentally get him fired after appealing to his strict boss, Ms. Plaskett (nicknamed "The Dragon Lady").

At the ranch, the girls meet Natty's kind but mysterious foreman, George Tailfeathers, and her lazy, scheming son Bart Gifooley. Sarah's old horse, Lightning, leads the twins to a hidden diary revealing that Bart once tried to burn the ranch and plans to sell it. The girls discover his secret hideout, “The Bear’s Mouth,” and overhear his schemes to sabotage visitors.

With George's support, Jessica and Susie persuade Natty to refurbish and reopen the ranch. Bart, meanwhile, secretly arranges to sell the property to businessman Leo McRugger, planning to turn it into "Gifooley Land" theme park. When the girls expose his deception, Natty angrily expels Bart.

Stephen, still unemployed, fails to secure a bank loan, unaware that the bank is already aligned with Bart's plans. Determined to save the ranch, the girls travel to Denver to meet McRugger, convincing him and his associates to visit and experience the ranch themselves. Stephen, Natty, George, Laura Forrester, and the twins prepare activities to impress the investors, but Bart repeatedly sabotages their efforts. The twins then search for a hidden treasure based on their mother's map. Though they find only fool's gold, McRugger is charmed and agrees not to purchase the ranch.

Bart attempts one last act of revenge, kidnapping the girls on a raft and sending them downriver toward a dam. They escape by grabbing a rope hanging from a bridge, while Bart crashes over the dam and is seriously injured. In the end, the ranch is saved, and everyone celebrates with a dance, except for Bart, who is left sulking.

== Cast ==
- Ashley Olsen as Jessica Martin
- Mary-Kate Olsen as Susie Martin
- Elizabeth Olsen as Girl In Car
- Martin Mull as Bart Gifooley
- Michele Greene as Laura Forrester
- Patrick Cassidy as Stephen Martin
- Ben Cardinal as George Tailfeathers
- Leon Pownall as Leo McRugger
- Peg Phillips as Natty
- Wes Tritter as Cookie
- Georgie Collins as Mrs. Plaskett
- Heather Lea MacCallum as Leona
- Shaun Johnston as Phil
- Daniel Libman as Roger
- Bartley Bard as Mr. Sutton

== Reception ==
Variety said that "young female viewers will no doubt identify with these resourceful sisters, but, for others, the helming is generally routine and doesn’t light up the family/juvenile market."

== Production ==
The Olsens signed on with an initial agreement of $1 million minimum each, with a larger pay raise of the film was completed underbudget. The film was filmed in the Canadian Rockies, one hour west of Calgary, Alberta at Rafter Six Ranch Resort. Shots in the city were done within Calgary, including a ride on Calgary Transit's C-Train.

== See also ==
- List of American films of 1994
