= Darren E. Burrows =

American actor (born 1966)

- Born: September 12, 1966 (age 59); Winfield, Kansas, U.S.
- Occupation: Actor
- Years active: 1988–present
- Height: 6 ft 1 in (185 cm)
- Spouse: Melinda Delgado (m. 1993)
- Children: 4
- Father: Billy Drago
- Relatives: Silvana Gallardo (stepmother)

Darren E. Burrows (born September 12, 1966) is an American actor. He is best known for playing Ed Chigliak in the television series Northern Exposure. He also appeared in the films Cry-Baby (1990), Amistad (1997), Sunset Strip (2000), Forty Shades of Blue (2005), in a season six episode of The X-Files and in Season 9 (Episode 11) of CSI: Crime Scene Investigation.

== Northern Exposure ==
Following some minor roles in major films, Burrows came to prominence as a series regular on the television series Northern Exposure, in which he portrayed Ed Chigliak. The character is a mild-mannered, half-Native Alaskan who was abandoned as a young child and raised by the local Tlingits. A film buff and would-be director, he is shown producing a number of short films about life in small town Alaska. In season 5, Chigliak becomes a shaman-in-training. The character battles low self-esteem (a development that Burrows later expressed his disapproval over).

== Life after Northern Exposure ==
Burrows wrote a book about his experiences on the show called Northern Exposed, which was published in 2013.

In 2016, Burrows and his production company, Film Farms, held a crowdfunding campaign to fund a development project with the goal of creating more episodes. The working title for this project is "Northern Exposure: Home Again". Despite not meeting the original $100,000 goal, Burrows decided to continue with the project.

The revival was originally envisioned as a two-hour "visit to Cicely," but a ten-episode series was reportedly being pitched to various network, cable, and streaming venues. These efforts eventually stalled, and the show was not revived.

== Personal life ==
Burrows was born in Winfield, Kansas, the son of actor Billy Drago and stepson to actress Silvana Gallardo. As a child, he briefly lived near Aulne, Kansas. Burrows did not meet his father until the late 1980s when he came out to LA to meet Drago. In an effort to have something in common to talk to his father about, he decided to go to acting classes and "just kind of slipped into" acting.. On the Northern Disclosure podcast, season one episode 6, Burrows confirms that he does not have any Native American ancestry. He has Romani ancestry from his paternal grandmother.

Burrows currently lives in the Ozark Mountains, Missouri, on a ranch raising Red Dexter cattle with his wife Melinda. Inspired by an engraving class gifted to him by Melinda, Burrows also designs and handcrafts unique jewelry.

== Filmography ==
Year	Film	Role	Notes
1988	976-EVIL	Jeff	Film
1989	Casualties of War	"Cherry"	Film starring Sean Penn, Michael J. Fox, John Leguizamo
1990	Cry-Baby	Milton Hackett	
1990	Class of 1999	Sonny	
1996	The Siege at Ruby Ridge	Kevin Harris	
1997	Amistad	Lieutenant Meade	
1997	Naked in the Cold Sun	Allard	
1998	The Hi-Lo Country	Billy Harte	
1999	Natural Selection	Glenn Royce	
2000	Sunset Strip	Bobby	
2001	Lady in the Box	Jerry Holway	
2001	Morning	Emmanuel	
2002	Never Get Outta the Boat	Franky	
2005	Forty Shades of Blue	Michael James	
2008	The Shadow of the Night	Detective	Short Film
2010	Nonames	Officer Dale	
2010	The Tell-Tale Heart	William	Video Short (also producer)
2014	Love Is Strange	Elliot	
2015	Turning Home	Wes	
2019	New Chilling Tales: The Anthology	The Young Man	(also producer)
2023	Magpie Funeral	Sy McMurphy	(also producer)

== Television credits ==
Year	Title	Role	Notes
1989	Hard Time on Planet Earth	Young Man	Episode: "Battle of the Sexes"
1989–1990	TV 101	Brian Miller	3 episodes
1990–1995	Northern Exposure	Ed Chigliak / Emery Whirlwind / Ned	Series regular, 110 episodes
1998	NYPD Blue	Royce	Episode: "Prostrate Before the Law"
1999	The X Files	Bernard	Episode: "Monday"
2001	The Lone Gunmen	Pfeiffer	Episode: "Maximum Byers"
2003	Peacemakers	Anthony Post	Episode: "Dead to Rights"
2009	CSI: Crime Scene Investigation	Mr. Jim Hilliard	Episode: "The Grave Shift"

== Award nominations ==
He and the rest of the Northern Exposure cast were nominated in 1995 for the Screen Actors Guild Awards Outstanding Performance by an Ensemble in a Comedy Series.
