= Peg Phillips =

American actress (1918–2002)

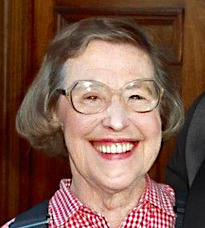
- Peg Phillips in 1993
- Born: Margaret Linton; September 20, 1918; Everett, Washington, U.S.
- Died: November 7, 2002 (aged 84); Seattle, Washington, U.S.
- Other names: Margaret Peg Phillips; Margaret May Phillips
- Spouse(s): Daniel W. Greene (m. Sept. 20, 1937; div. 194?); Chester Phillips (m. 195?; div. 19??)
- Children: 4

Margaret May Phillips (née Linton; September 20, 1918 – November 7, 2002) was an American actress best known for playing storekeeper Ruth-Anne Miller on the television series Northern Exposure but has also had several guest roles in 7th Heaven, How the West Was Fun, and ER.

== Early life ==
Phillips was born Margaret Linton in Everett, Washington, to Charles and Myrtle Linton. She wanted to be an actress from the age of four and performed in dinner theater as a hobby. She was the wife of Daniel Greene, a Navy man stationed in the Territory of Hawaii when the attack on Pearl Harbor occurred. She was married to Chester Phillips in the 1950s, during which time she suffered a near-fatal bout of "polio and a serious abdominal infection".

She lived with her children Kathy, Virginia and Arthur in Santa Cruz, California, in the early to mid-1960s. Her oldest daughter, Elisabeth, had left the household. She worked as an accountant at Sweet Service in Santa Cruz during that time. She was involved with local theatrical groups; her favorite play was Bell, Book and Candle. After retiring from accounting, Phillips moved back to Washington to enroll in drama school at the University of Washington, but never completed her degree "because I started getting so much work."

== Career ==
She started acting professionally in her late 60s. Her first film performance was in the TV movie Chase in 1985. In 1990, she originated the role of Ruth-Anne Miller on Northern Exposure. The character had been intended to be intermittent, but gradually appeared more frequently until she became a regular. She was nominated for the Primetime Emmy Award for Outstanding Supporting Actress in a Drama Series in 1993.

According to her obituary in The Los Angeles Times, Phillips' favorite episode of the series was "the one in which the shopkeeper’s young Native American friend, Ed Chigliak, gave her a wilderness-area grave site for her birthday and the two danced on the site. 'That was the most beautiful script I’ve ever been asked to perform,' the actress told the St. Louis Post-Dispatch in 1992."

After the fifth season of the show was wrapped up in 1995, she was undergoing heart surgery when an aortic aneurysm ruptured. Had she not already been on the operating table, it probably would have been fatal.

After Northern Exposure, Phillips played several guest roles, especially on 7th Heaven. She played the dude ranch-owning godmother of Mary-Kate and Ashley Olsen's characters in How the West Was Fun. Her last role was a guest spot on ER in 2000. She also founded the Woodinville Repertory Theatre in 1998.

== Death ==
She died in 2002 from pulmonary disease in Seattle, aged 84. Like her Northern Exposure character, she was a smoker from an early age, having started at 13.

== Television credits and nominations ==
| Year | Title | Role | Notes |
|---|---|---|---|
| 1990–95 | Northern Exposure | Ruth-Anne Miller | 105 episodes |
| 1996 | Suddenly Susan | Judge Cameron | Episode: "Golden Girl Friday" |
| 1996 | Boston Common | Rose | Episode: "A Triage Grows in Boston" |
| 1996 | Touched by an Angel | Zelda Widdenberg | Episode: "The Journalist" |
| 1996–99 | 7th Heaven | Mrs. Hinkle | 4 episodes |
| 2000 | ER | Mrs. Duffy | Episode: "The Domino Heart" |

| Year | Association | Category | Nominated work | Result |
|---|---|---|---|---|
| 1993 | Primetime Emmy Awards | Outstanding Supporting Actress in a Drama Series | Northern Exposure | Nominated |
| 1994 | Viewers for Quality Television | Best Supporting Actress in a Quality Drama Series | Northern Exposure | Nominated |
| 1995 | Screen Actors Guild Awards | Outstanding Performance by an Ensemble in a Comedy Series | Northern Exposure | Nominated |

== Filmography ==
| Year | Title | Role | Notes |
|---|---|---|---|
| 1985 | Chase | Auntie Jane | Television movie |
| 1990 | Waiting for the Light | Iris | |
| 1991 | Dogfight | Older Cafe Customer | |
| 1994 | How the West Was Fun | Natty | Television movie |
| 1996 | Jerry Maguire | Video tape at bachelor party | Uncredited |
