= Marilyn Smith =

American aerospace engineer

Marilyn J. Smith is an American aerospace engineer.

Smith earned her bachelor's, master's, and doctoral degrees in aerospace engineering at Georgia Tech. Her studies were funded by Lockheed Martin. She also worked for McDonnell Douglas. Smith later joined the Georgia Tech faculty as professor and director of the Vertical Lift Research Center of Excellence. In 2016, she was elected a fellow of the American Institute of Aeronautics and Astronautics. Smith was the 2022 recipient of the AIAA Aerodynamics Award.
