= Marilyn Martino =

Venezuelan politician

National Assembly of Venezuela alternate deputy
- Incumbent
- Assumed office 5 January 2016
- Constituency: Carabobo state

Personal details
- Occupation: Politician

Marilyn Martino is a Venezuelan politician, alternate deputy of the National Assembly for the Carabobo state.

== Career ==
Martino was elected as alternate deputy in the National Assembly for the Carabobo state for the 2016–2021 term in the 2015 parliamentary elections. By 2020, she was outside of the country.

== See also ==
- IV National Assembly of Venezuela
