= Richard Cummings Jr. =

American actor

- Born: New York City, U.S.
- Education: Stony Brook University
- Occupations: Actor; Film director

Richard Cummings Jr. is an American actor and film director most recognized for his acting roles in the dramas thirtysomething and Northern Exposure. He is currently working as a film and television director.

Recent projects include partnering with Warner Bros. Television and Don Cornelius to produce a new series and planned film at Dimension Films.

== Early career ==
Cummings Jr. was born and raised in New York City, where he played basketball in high school and thought he would continue in college. However, he soon landed his first acting gig, a Wheaties commercial. While attending college at Stony Brook, he commuted to the city for auditions. After two years, he left to pursue his acting career in Los Angeles.

Television commercials led to series work. He guest-starred on Kojak, The White Shadow and Hill Street Blues before landing the role of account executive Mark Harriton on thirtysomething. Then he was cast in Northern Exposure with John Corbett and did voice-over work for the Korean automaker Hyundai

== Producing and directing ==
While continuing to pursue his acting career, Cummings Jr. teamed up with Robert Townsend to act in and produce the surprise hit feature, Hollywood Shuffle. At the same time, he partnered with fellow "Shuffle" producer Carl Craig to form Underdog Films to produce music videos showcasing emerging urban/r&b artists. Underdog Films worked with directors such as Hype Williams and The Hughes Brothers and produced videos for platinum artists such as N.W.A., Dr. Dre, Ice Cube, Red Hot Chili Peppers and Snoop Dogg. The company won the MTV Video Music Awards for Best Rap Video in 1996 and also produced videos for the soundtracks to Boyz n the Hood and House Party 3. In addition, Underdog produced a number of commercial spots for Rock the Vote during the Clinton presidential campaign.

In addition, Cummings Jr. had directed multiple videos for platinum recording artist Candyman and Jazz artist George Howard, among others. He produced and directed the independent film Thicker Than Water with Ice Cube, Fat Joe and Mack 10 and most recently produced another independent film, "Playas Ball," financed by NBA player Dale Davis of the Golden State Warriors.

== Current projects ==
Cummings Jr. was producing the Usher project with Jonathan Prince for Dimension Films. The movie would have been an updated version of Jailhouse Rock in which Usher would have both acted and sung. He was also developing a one-hour drama with Prince, Warner Bros and Don Cornelius Productions for Fox Television, which did not materialize before the musician’s death in 2016.
