= List of fictional Native Americans =

This is the list of fictional Native Americans from notable works of fiction (literatures, films, television shows, video games, etc.). It is organized by the examples of the fictional indigenous peoples of North America: the United States, Canada and Mexico, ones that are the historical figures and others that are modern.

== Literature ==
This section contains examples of the writing of both Native and non-Native authors.

Native American	Work	Notes	Author	Ref(s)
Arnold Spirit Jr. (Junior)	The Absolutely True Diary of a Part-Time Indian	A 14-year-old Spokane boy who lives on the Indian reservation with his parents Arnold Spirit Sr. and Agnes Adams.	Sherman Alexie	
Arnold Spirit Sr.	The Absolutely True Diary of a Part-Time Indian	Junior's father who could have been a jazz musician.	Sherman Alexie	
Zits (Michael)	Flight	A 15-year-old boy who is the foster child and the main character of the story.	Sherman Alexie	
Thomas Builds-the-Fire	The Lone Ranger and Tonto Fistfight in Heaven	The character who appears in "This is What it Means to Say Phoenix, Arizona".	Sherman Alexie	
Victor Joseph	The Lone Ranger and Tonto Fistfight in Heaven	One of the main characters of the short story collection.	Sherman Alexie	
Coyote Springs	Reservation Blues	An all-Native rock and blues band of the Spokane tribe.	Sherman Alexie	
Esselen Girl	The Lariat	She was the first Esselen Indian to be converted by Spanish Franciscan friar Fray Luis.	Jaime de Angulo	
Hualala	The Lariat	The medicine man and the husband of the Esselen Girl.	Jaime de Angulo	
Shasta	Shasta of the Wolves	Set in the 19th-century Pacific Northwest, Shasta is a Native American feral boy who is raised by a pack of Cascade mountain wolves (similar to Mowgli from The Jungle Book), learning animal communication and body language and befriending forest creatures such as the wise American black bear named Gomposh. It is later revealed that he is the long-lost grandson of the tribal chief whose enemy tribe, the Assiniboinnes, have repeatedly attempted to sacrifice Shasta.	Olaf Baker	
Little Bear	The Indian in the Cupboard	Little Bear is a small plastic figurine that magically comes to life in a cupboard. He also appeared in the following sequels: The Return of the Indian; The Secret of the Indian; The Mystery of the Cupboard; The Key to the Indian	Lynne Reid Banks	
Tiger Lily	Peter and Wendy	There is controversy over the stereotypes of Native Americans in both Barrie's 1904 stage play and 1911 novel, depicting them as the "Piccaninny" tribe of the "redskin savages" on the fictional island of Neverland, with Tiger Lily being called an "Indian princess". Tiger Lily, the daughter of Chief Great Big Little Panther, is frequently portrayed as an obstinate Native girl who is taken captive to drown by Captain Hook and his pirate crew but is rescued by Peter Pan, who she names him the "Great White Father".	J. M. Barrie	
Shining Pearl	Peter and the Secret of Rundoon	The daughter of Chief Fighting Prawn and the analog of Tiger Lily.	Dave Barry and Ridley Pearson	
Fighting Prawn	Peter and the Starcatchers	The chieftain of the fictional Mollusk Tribe.	Dave Barry and Ridley Pearson	
Cheyenne people	Little Big Man	Old Lodge Skins, the tribal chief; Younger Bear; Shadow-That-Comes-in-Sight (or Shadow for short), the Cheyenne brave; Sunshine, daughter of Shadow; Burns-Red-in-the-Sun; Little Horse; Buffalo Wallow Woman; Digging Bear, Little Elk and Corn Woman	Thomas Berger	
Kicking Bird	Dances with Wolves	The Sioux medicine man.	Michael Blake	
Stands-With-A-Fist	Dances with Wolves	She is the adoptive daughter of Kicking Bird and the wife of Lieutenant John Dunbar (aka Dances-with-Wolves).	Michael Blake	
Chief Ten Bears	Dances with Wolves		Michael Blake	
Winds-In-His-Hair	Dances with Wolves	A Sioux warrior.	Michael Blake	
Wolf	Tiger Eyes	A mysterious Native climber.	Judy Blume	
Running Dog	Black Fox		Matt Braun	
Mercedes "Mercy" Thompson	Mercy Thompson series	The young Blackfoot woman who is a "Walker", a shapeshifter in which she turns into a coyote in the night though not linked to the moon.	Patricia Briggs	
Zack Banning	Comanche Moon	The son of the Comanche chief.	Virginia Brown	
Waukewa	Waukewa's Eagle	A young Indian boy who befriends a broken-winged eagle.	James Buckham	
Toriano	Adobe Walls	The son of the Apache Chief.	W. R. Burnett	
Corby	Children of the Dust	The Cheyenne boy.	Clancy Carlile	
Chingachgook	Leatherstocking Tales	The Mohican chief and the companion of Natty Bumppo.	James Fenimore Cooper	
Magua	Leatherstocking Tales	The antagonistic Huron warrior in the novel The Last of the Mohicans.	James Fenimore Cooper	
Uncas	Leatherstocking Tales	Chingachgook's son who was killed by Magua.	James Fenimore Cooper	
Hard Heart	The Prairie	A brave, trustworthy Pawnee warrior.	James Fenimore Cooper	
Chief Mahtoree	The Prairie	A crafty Teton Sioux chief.	James Fenimore Cooper	
Tachechana	The Prairie	The wife of Mahtoree.	James Fenimore Cooper	
Soft Rain	Soft Rain: A Story of the Cherokee Trail of Tears	A young Cherokee girl who lives in the Tsalagi community of North Carolina with her parents and her younger brother, Hawk Boy.>	Cornelia Cornelissen	
Scarface	The Book of Myths	A scarred Native American warrior who is rewarded to marry the Chief's daughter after saving the Sun God's son, Morning Star, from giant birds of prey.	Amy Cruse	
She-Who-Is-Alone	The Legend of the Bluebonnet	A Comanche girl who has lost her parents. Based on the original Native American folklore, retold and illustrated by Tomie dePaola. (This was later adapted as the 2nd story of "Tales of the First People, Vol I: Spirit Tales" in 2016)	Tomie dePaola	
Morning Girl and Star Boy	Morning Girl	The two Taíno siblings who recreate a life on the Bahamian island.	Michael Dorris	
Walnut/Sees-Behind-Trees	Sees Behind Trees		Michael Dorris	
Christine George Taylor	A Yellow Raft in Blue Water	She has been separated from her husband, Elgin Taylor.	Michael Dorris	
Aunt Ida George	A Yellow Raft in Blue Water	She is a legal mother of Christine.	Michael Dorris	
Rayona Diane Taylor	A Yellow Raft in Blue Water	The half-Native American daughter of Christine and Elgin.	Michael Dorris	
Cogewea	Cogewea, the Half-Blood: A Depiction of the Great Montana Cattle Range	The protagonist who is both Indigenous and Euro-American.	Mourning Dove	
Blue Back	Drums Along the Mohawk	A friendly Oneida man.	Walter D. Edmonds	
Celestine James	The Beet Queen	The half-Native American who would become a best friend of Mary Adare.	Louise Erdrich	
Omakayas (aka Little Frog)	The Birchbark House	She is the main character of the story. She also appeared in the following sequels, The Game of Silence and The Porcupine Year. Omakayas has her family included in the story: Nokomis, Omakayas's maternal grandmother.; Yellow Kettle, Omakayas's strong mother.; Deydey, Omakayas's father who is half white and half Ojibwe.; Angeline, a sister whom Omakayas sees and loves as a role model.; Pinch and Neewo, Omakayas's younger brothers whom she loves very much.	Louise Erdrich	
Fleur Pillager	Four Souls	An Ojibwe woman.	Louise Erdrich	
LaRose Iron	LaRose	A Native American boy and the titular character of the story.	Louise Erdrich	
Landreaux and Emmaline Iron	LaRose	The parents of LaRose Iron.	Louise Erdrich	
Dusty Ravich	LaRose	The son of Peter and Nola Ravich and the best friend of LaRose Iron. He was only five years old when he was shot and killed accidentally by Landreaux Iron.	Louise Erdrich	
Father Damien Modeste	Last Report on the Miracles at Little No Horse	The priest of the Ojibwe people.	Louise Erdrich	
Marie Lazarre Kashpaw	Love Medicine	She is married to Nector Kashpaw.	Louise Erdrich	
Nector Kashpaw	Love Medicine	He is the son of Rushes Bear and Kashpaw; the husband of Marie Lazarre Kashpaw.	Louise Erdrich	
Evelina Harp	The Plaque of Doves	The girl who is part Ojibwe and part white.	Louise Erdrich	
Mooshum	The Plaque of Doves	The grandfather of Evelina Harp.	Louise Erdrich	
Antone "Joe" Coutts	The Round House	The 13-year-old Ojibwe son of Geraldine and Bazil Coutts.	Louise Erdrich	
Laughing Boy	Laughing Boy		Oliver La Farge	
Slim Girl	Laughing Boy		Oliver La Farge	
Roger Two Hawks	The Gate of Time	He is the Iroquois combat pilot in World War II whose ancestors of the various Native Americans had wandered westward into Europe, rather than to cross the non-existent Bering Strait after the continent of America was drowned for the whole of humanity's tenure on Earth.	Philip José Farmer	
Lotus	Mountain Man	A lone woman who is left alive after an Indian massacre. The historical novel that is a largely fictionalized retelling of the experiences of Liver-Eating Johnson, a real-life mountain man.	Vardis Fisher	
Tess	Soldier Sister, Fly Home	A 13-year-old girl who is having a hard time understanding what it means to be part Navajo and part white; a sister of Gaby. A story that is inspired by the death of Lori Piestewa, illustrated by Shonto Begay.	Nancy Bo Flood	
Chief Bear	Thirteen Moons	The local chief of the Cherokee Nation.	Charles Frazier	
Featherstone	Thirteen Moons		Charles Frazier	
Billie Wind	The Talking Earth	A girl of the Seminole tribe who has to find the answers to believe the legends about the earth spirits and talking animals.	Jean Craighead George	
Apaches and Comanches	Savage Sam	A group of Indians who can abduct Travis and Arliss Coates and Lisbeth Searcy.	Fred Gipson	
Dark Water	An Undisturbed Peace	The daughter of the powerful Cherokee chief and one of the main characters of the story.	Mary Glickman	
Crow Chief	Crow Chief: A Plains Indian Story		Paul Goble	
Falling Star	Crow Chief: A Plains Indian Story	The savior.	Paul Goble	
Brave Indian Boy	The Gift of the Sacred Dog		Paul Goble	
Indian Girl	The Girl Who Loved Wild Horses		Paul Goble	
Iktomi	Iktomi series	The Plains Indian trickster.	Paul Goble	
Chief's Daughter	Star Boy	Retold and illustrated by Paul Goble.	Paul Goble	
Star Boy	Star Boy	The son of Morning Star and Evening Star and the titular character of the story.	Paul Goble	
Morning Plume	The Storm Maker's Tipi	One of the two Blackfoot hunters.	Paul Goble	
Sacred Otter	The Storm Maker's Tipi	The father of Morning Plume and one of the two Blackfoot hunters.	Paul Goble	
Nophaie	The Vanishing American	A young Navajo and the main character of the story.	Zane Grey	
Teal Eye	The Big Sky	The daughter of the late Blackfoot chief and the wife of Boone Caudill.	A. B. Guthrie, Jr.	
Chief Heavy Runner	Fair Land, Fair Land	The Blackfoot chief.	A. B. Guthrie, Jr.	
Little Wing	Fair Land, Fair Land	The granddaughter of the Shoshone chief and the wife of Hezekiah Higgins.	A. B. Guthrie, Jr.	
Bernadette Manuelito	Leaphorn & Chee series	The wife of Officer Jim Chee. She was formerly a federal Customs Patrol Officer and is now a Navajo Tribal Police Officer.	Tony Hillerman and Anne Hillerman	
Jim Chee	Leaphorn & Chee series	One of the two Navajo Tribal Police Officers.	Tony Hillerman and Anne Hillerman	
Joe Leaphorn	Leaphorn & Chee series	One of the two Navajo Tribal Police Officers and the "Legendary Lieutenant".	Tony Hillerman and Anne Hillerman	
Wusamequin	Spirited	A young medicine man who alerts his warriors to capture Isabella Sevens and her father. A retelling of Beauty and the Beast and an homage to The Last of the Mohicans.	Nancy Holder	
Ezol Day	Miko Kings: An Indian Baseball Story	A postal clerk in the Indian Territory.	LeAnne Howe	
Hope Little Leader	Miko Kings: An Indian Baseball Story	A Choctaw pitcher for the fictitious team of the Miko Kings.	LeAnne Howe	
Buffalo Horn	Flaming Star	He was a native hunter.	Clair Huffaker	
Pacer Burton	Flaming Star	He is a half-breed, half Native American and half white.	Clair Huffaker	
Soldat du Chene	Little House on the Prairie	He is the French-speaking chief of the Osage Nation in Kansas, loosely based on the real-life Osage chief.	Laura Ingalls Wilder	
Alessandro Assis	Ramona	A young Native sheepherder.	Helen Hunt Jackson	
Ramona	Ramona	The title character who is a Scottish-Native American orphan girl, raised by Señora Gonzaga Moreno.	Helen Hunt Jackson	
Fish Hawk	Old Fish Hawk	The last of the Osage Indians.	Mitchell F. Jayne	
Melissa Little Brid	The Cold Dish	A local Indian girl.	Craig Johnson	
Henry Standing Bear	Walt Longmire series	A Cheyenne man who is a friend of Sheriff Walt Longmire.	Craig Johnson	
John Morgan/Shunkawakan	A Man Called Horse	Although John Morgan was not born to the Sioux natives but to be a Boston aristocrat, he was at first being held captive by those people until he later became a member of their tribe. His Native-American name Shunkawakan means "Horse" in the Sioux language for he was treated as a horse.	Dorothy M. Johnson	
Chief Yellow Hand	A Man Called Horse	He is the chief of the Sioux tribe.	Dorothy M. Johnson	
Inuk Girl	Mama, Do You Love Me?	Illustrated by Barbara Lavallee.	Barbara M. Joosse	
Mama	Mama, Do You Love Me?	The mother of an Inuk girl.	Barbara M. Joosse	
Bromden	One Flew Over the Cuckoo's Nest	A large yet docile half-Native American "chief" who is mute and deaf; the first person narrator of the story.	Ken Kesey	
Lum	Truth and Bright Water	The cousin of Tecumseh and the son of tribal leader Franklin.	Thomas King	
Tecumseh	Truth and Bright Water	A 15-year-old Blackfoot boy of the Truth town in rural Montana and the first person narrator of the story; the son of Helen and Elvin and the nephew of Auntie Cassie. He is named after the famous Shawnee chief.	Thomas King	
Turtle	The Bean Trees; Pigs in Heaven	A three-year-old Cherokee girl who was adopted by Taylor Greer.	Barbara Kingsolver	
Uglik	Night of the White Bear	The main character, a 16-year-old Inuk boy who is stalked by a lone polar bear in the Canadian Arctic.	Alexander Knox	
John Russell	Hombre	He was raised by the Apaches and led the passengers of the attacked stagecoach through the desert to safety.	Elmore Leonard	
A Frog Girl	Frog Girl	Girl travels through underground of frogs, saves her town, and sets free frogs that were captured.	Paul Owen Lewis	
The Yeehats	The Call of the Wild	The Native American group.	Jack London	
Grey Beaver	White Fang	A Native American chief who is the first master of a wolfdog, White Fang.	Jack London	
Hiawatha	The Song of Hiawatha	An Ojibwe warrior in the 1855 epic poem.	Henry Wadsworth Longfellow	
Minnehaha	The Song of Hiawatha	She was a Dakota woman who was the lover of Hiawatha.	Henry Wadsworth Longfellow	
Mudjekeewis	The Song of Hiawatha	Loosely based on the Ojibwe mythological spirit of the same name.	Henry Wadsworth Longfellow	
Nokomis	The Song of Hiawatha	Hiawatha's grandmother who fell from the Moon.	Henry Wadsworth Longfellow	
Ruby and Mogie Yellow Lodge	Skins	The Lakota Sioux brothers of the fictional Beaver Creek Indian Reservation.	Adrian C. Louis	
Renee LaRoche	Along the Journey River	Renee is the first "openly out Indigenous lesbian" in a detective novel.	Carole LaFavor	
Pearce	Breakheart Pass	The Indian agent and lawman.	Alistair MacLean	
Strong Wind	The Indian Cinderella	He is the Indian warrior who goes invisible and later ends up marrying the Chief's disfigured daughter.	Cyrus MacMillan	
Rough-Faced Girl	The Rough-faced Girl	An Algonquin girl who is disfigured but has to win over a mysterious man, the Invisible Being, to be his bride. A retelling folklore inspired by Cinderella, illustrated by David Shannon.	Rafe Martin	
Nscho-tschi	Old Firehand	She was the daughter of the late Chief Intschu-tschuna and the sister of Chief Winnetou.	Karl May	
Winnetou	Old Firehand	He is the Native American hero who succeeds his father Intschu-tschuna as the chief of the Mescalero Apache. He is a friend and blood brother of German cowboy Old Shatterhand.	Karl May	
Kimmy	Grandmother's Dreamcatcher	Illustrated by Stacey Schuett.	Becky Ray McCain	
Chippewa Grandmother	Grandmother's Dreamcatcher	The grandmother of Kimmy.	Becky Ray McCain	
Blue Duck	Lonesome Dove series	The leader of a band of renegade Indians and Caucasian bandits; the son of Chief Buffalo Hump.	Larry McMurtry	
Chief Buffalo Hump	Lonesome Dove series	The Comanche war-chief and the father of Blue Duck. Based on the real-life Buffalo Hump.	Larry McMurtry	
Kicking Wolf	Lonesome Dove series	The Comanche warrior and accomplished horse thief.	Larry McMurtry	
Catherine LaLoup Leon	The Surrounded	The daughter of the Salish chief, wife of Max Leon, and the mother of Archilde Leon.	D'Arcy McNickle	
Taha Aki	Twilight	He was one of the last spirit chiefs and the first shape-shifter of the Quileute tribe in La Push, Washington.	Stephenie Meyer	
Billy Black	Twilight	The elder of the Quileute tribe.	Stephenie Meyer	
Ephraim Black	Twilight	He was the last chief of the Quileute tribe and the great-grandfather of Jacob Black.	Stephenie Meyer	
Jacob Black	Twilight	The son of Billy Black, Jacob is a Native American werewolf.	Stephenie Meyer	
Harry Clearwater	Twilight	He was the elder of the Quileute tribe who died of a heart attack in New Moon.	Stephenie Meyer	
Leah Clearwater	Twilight	She is the daughter of Harry and Sue Clearwater, who is the only known female shape-shifting werewolf in the history of the Quileute tribe.	Stephenie Meyer	
Seth Clearwater	Twilight	Leah's younger brother who transforms into a wolf around the same time as his sister.	Stephenie Meyer	
Sam Uley	Twilight	He is the Alpha, or the leader, and the oldest member of the La Push pack; the ex-boyfriend of Leah Clearwater. When he was young, Sam and his mother Allison had been abandoned by his father Joshua.	Stephenie Meyer	
Lame Beaver	Centennial	The Arapaho warrior and chieftain and one of the main characters of the story.	James A. Michener	
Abel	House Made of Dawn	The main character of the story.	N. Scott Momaday	
Moyo	Runaway Papoose	A young Navajo shepherd boy. Illustrated by Carl Moon.	Grace Moon	
Nah-tee	Runaway Papoose	A four-year-old Indian girl.	Grace Moon	
Chomina	Black Robe	He is an elder Algonkin traveler who helps guide Jesuit priest Father Paul LaForgue and his young French assistant Daniel Davost to the fictional Huron tribe of Ihonatiria.	Brian Moore	
Azákia	Ouabi; Or the Virtues of Nature: An Indian Tale in Four Cantos	A woman of the Illinois Indian tribe.	Sarah Wentworth Morton	
Ouábi	Ouabi; Or the Virtues of Nature: An Indian Tale in Four Cantos	The husband of Azákia.	Sarah Wentworth Morton	
Bald Eagle	Brother Jonathan: or, the New Englanders	Friend of the protagonist, Walter Harwood.	John Neal	
Logan	Logan	Based on Logan the Orator.	John Neal	
Tituba	Rachel Dyer	Based on Tituba.	John Neal	
Karana/Won-a-pa-lei	Island of the Blue Dolphins	Based upon a true story of Juana Maria, illustrated by Ted Lewin. Karana is a sister of Ramo and Ulape and the main character of the story.	Scott O'Dell	
Bright Morning	Sing Down the Moon	The girl of the Navajo tribe and the main character of the story.	Scott O'Dell	
Zia	Zia	The older sister of Mando and the niece of the late Karana; the mother of Rontu, Karana and young Mando.	Scott O'Dell	
Chief Spotted Wolf	Arrow in the Sun	The legendary Cheyenne chieftain.	T. V. Olsen	
Blue	There There	The girl who lives in the area of Oakland, California.	Tommy Orange	
Calvin Johnson	There There	A young Native man who owes drug money to his brother, Charles Johnson.	Tommy Orange	
Jacquie Red Feather	There There	A substance abuse counselor.	Tommy Orange	
Octavio Gomez	There There	A drug dealer and a cousin of Daniel Gonzales.	Tommy Orange	
Orvil Red Feather	There There	A Cheyenne teenage grandson of Jacquie Red Feather.	Tommy Orange	
Thomas Frank	There There	A Cheyenne drummer who worked formerly as a custodian at the Indian Center.	Tommy Orange	
Chief Showcase	Yellow Back Radio Broke-Down	The last surviving Native in the fictional Yellow Back Radio region.	Ishmael Reed	
Cuyloga	The Light in the Forest	He is the chief of the Lenni Lenape village in Ohio who adopts John Butler after taking him as captive in the raid, renaming him "True Son".	Conrad Richter	
Half Arrow	The Light in the Forest	He is the Lenape cousin of John Butler/True Son, who accompanies him to Fort Pitt in Pennsylvania.	Conrad Richter	
Piper McLean	The Heroes of Olympus	A demigod daughter of Aphrodite who is half Cherokee.	Rick Riordan	
Kimi	Blue Birds	A girl from the Roanoke tribe who befriends with the English girl named Alis.	Caroline Starr Rose	
Elk	The Horsecatcher	An adolescent Cheyenne and the main character who wants to be a wild horse tamer; the son of Elk River, nephew of Owl Friend, and younger brother of Two Wolves.	Mari Sandoz	
Elk River	The Horsecatcher	The headman of the band of Southern Cheyenne people and the father of Two Wolves and Elk.	Mari Sandoz	
Buddy Red Bird	The Powwow Highway	The member of the Cheyenne tribe in Lame Deer, Montana.	David Seals	
Moki	The Biography of a Grizzly	A Cree Indian and one of the main characters of the story.	Ernest Thompson Seton	
Kwani	Kwani series	An eponymous character who was born into the long extinct fictional Anasazi tribe.	Linda Lay Shuler	
Tayo	Ceremony	The Laguna Pueblo man and the central character of the story who is half-Pueblo and half-white.	Leslie Marmon Silko	
Attean	The Sign of the Beaver	He is the grandson of the Indian chief.	Elizabeth George Speare	
Rick	The Culled	The main protagonist who belongs to the Haudenosaunee people.	Simon Spurrier	
Martha Tom	Crossing Bok Chitto: A Choctaw Tale of Friendship & Freedom	A young Choctaw girl who befriends with a slave and his son, Little Mo.	Tim Tingle	
Danny Blackgoat	Danny Blackgoat series	A Navajo teenage boy.	Tim Tingle	
Rose Goode	House of Purple Cedar	A Choctaw girl who escapes as twenty other Native girls have died when the Choctaw community, Skullyville, has been destroyed; the granddaughter of Amafo and Pokoni.	Tim Tingle	
Isaac	How I Became a Ghost; When a Ghost Talks, Listen	A Choctaw boy who did not survived the Trail of Tears and ended up becoming a ghost.	Tim Tingle	
Sarah Nita	The Girl Who Chased Away Sorrow	A Navajo girl, in part of the Dear America book series.	Ann Turner	
Injun Joe	The Adventures of Tom Sawyer	The archnemesis of Tom Sawyer and Huckleberry Finn, described as a "half-breed" Native American. He subsequently kills Dr. Robinson at the town cemetery and frames the friendly fisherman, Muff Potter, for the crime.	Mark Twain	
Shining Lighttower	Battle Cry	A Navajo Indian who is a member of the radio squad.	Leon Uris	
Fast Horse	Fools Crow	The son of Boss Ribs and a friend of Fools Crows.	James Welch	
Fools Crow/White Man's Dog	Fools Crow	The son of Chief Rides-at-the-Door and Double Strike Woman.	James Welch	
Red Paint	Fools Crow	She is married to Fools Crow and the daughter of Heavy Shield Woman and Yellow Kidney, leader of the horse raid.	James Welch	
Running Fisher	Fools Crow	The brother of Fools Crow.	James Welch	
Charging Elk	The Heartsong of Charging Elk	The Oglala Sioux man.	James Welch	
Virgil First Raise	Winter in the Blood	The main character and the first person narrator of the story.	James Welch	
Massai	Broncho Apache	The last Apache warrior, based on the real-life Massai.	Paul Wellman	

== Comics ==
Native American	Comic title	Notes	Ref(s)
Big Chief Keen-eyed-Mole	The Adventures of Tintin	The sachem of the Blackfoot Indians.	
Akwas	Akwas	The titular character of the comic strip.	
Super-Chief Flying Stag	All-Star Western	The 15th-century Iroquois.	
Elizabeth Twoyoungmen (Talisman)	Alpha Flight	She is the daughter of Michael Twoyoungmen/Shaman of the First Nations, who has some wide-ranging magical abilities.	
Thomas Fireheart (Puma)	The Amazing Spider-Man	He is a werecat of Native American descent.	
Charles Little Sky (Portal)	The Avengers	He is a Native American mutant superhero from Hartsdale, New Mexico, who is a director of A.R.M.O.R.	
William Talltrees	The Avengers	A man who is known as "Red Wolf" and is born in modern times in Wolf Point, Montana; the son of the Cheyenne tribal leader, Thomas Talltrees.	
Little Plum	The Beano	Little Plum-Stealing-Varmint	
Chini	Blueberry	Daughter of the aging Chief Cochise of the Navajo tribe, who is in the love triangle between Blueberry and Vittorio.	
Lone Eagle/Quanah	Blueberry	The cruel Apache Indian determined to defeat the white people who does his best to urge the Navajos to wage war.	
Chinook	Buddy Longway	A young Sioux woman who is married to a trapper, Buddy Longway, with whom she has two children Jeremy and Kathleen.	
Jesse Black Crow	Captain America	A Navajo who was paralyzed in a construction accident and possessed by the entity Black Crow. While Black Crow is controlling his body, Jesse possesses vast mystical abilities and has his mobility restored, but does not have any memory of its actions.	
Chief Medicine Crow	Cowboys & Aliens	The leader of the Apache Indians.	
Warhawk	Cowboys & Aliens	The Apache warrior.	
Geronimo Jr. (G-Junior)	Cyborg 009	Also known as Cyborg 005, he is a Native American who becomes the strongman of the 00 Cyborgs. A Japanese manga created by Shotaro Ishinomori.	
Maya Lopez (Echo)	Daredevil	A Native American superheroine who has been raised by the evil Kingpin after killing her father Crazy Horse, leaving a bloody handprint on her face.	
Juan Diego de la Muerte (El Muerto)	El Muerto: The Aztec Zombie	He is a young Native Mexican man from Magdalena de Kino who while on his way to the local Day of the Dead festival in Whittier, California has been sacrificed by the Aztec gods, only to return to earth one year later with supernatural powers. His superhero alias, El Muerto, is Spanish for "The Dead One".	
Wyatt Wingfoot	Fantastic Four	The member of the fictional Keewazi Indian reservation in Oklahoma and the supporting character.	
Wildrun	Fantastic Four Annual	He is known as the Red Wolf of the 19th century in the Wild West.	
Black Condor	Freedom Fighters	The team member of the Freedom Fighters.	
Charlie Iron-Knife (Spirit)	G.I. Joe	He is the member and original tracker of the G.I. Joe Team who was born to the poor Native American family in the Taos Pueblo Reservation.	
John Proudstar (Thunderbird)	Giant-Size X-Men	An Apache mutant and member of the X-Men. Killed shortly after his debut in 1975, Proudstar was resurrected decades later during the Krakoan Age.	
Young Raven	High Moon	The granddaughter of a legendary Native American character, Raven the Trickster; she is a Red Indian mystic and the lover of the African American outlaw, Eddie Conroy.	
Jenny Everywhere	Jenny Everywhere	A superheroine who exists in all universes at once.	
Sandman/Soundman	JoJo's Bizarre Adventure: Steel Ball Run	A Native American from the Arizona desert who enters the Steel Ball Run race in an attempt to buy back his tribe's land with the prize money. He uses a fictional running style that allows him to keep up with the other competitors' horses. Later, his name is revealed to have been mistranslated into English. His real name is Soundman due to his Stand, dubbed "In A Silent Way", being able to control sound.	
Manitou Dawn and Manitou Raven	Justice League	Manitou Dawn and Manitou Raven are Homo magi and ancestors of the Apache who join the Justice League, acting as magic specialists.	
Super-Chief Jon Standing Bear	Justice League	The team member of the Justice League of America.	
Nayeli Constant (Aztek)	Justice League of America	A Native Mexican superheroine who is formerly a software engineer in Austin, Texas but has been chosen to become Aztek to fight against the Aztec dark god, Tezcatlipoca. She is a successor of Curtis "Uno" Falconer	.
Miiyahbin Marten (Equinox)	Justice League United	The teenage Cree superheroine who is a team member of the Justice League United.	
Dawnstar	Legion of Super-Heroes	Her home planet of Starhaven was colonized by Native Americans.	
Lonesome Polecat	Li'l Abner		
Johnny Wakely	Marvel Spotlight	He was adopted by a white couple in the late 19th century.	
Jason Strongbow (American Eagle)	Marvel Two-in-One	He is a member of the Navajo Nation who attempted to seize a mining company from excavating a mountain sacred to his tribe.	
Danielle Moonstar	The New Mutants	A North Cheyenne superheroine who is a member of the X-Men, Young X-Men and Fearless Defenders.	
Alani Ryan (Loa)	The New Mutants	A surfing mutant superheroine and a student of the Xavier Institute from Maui, Hawaii, who is half-Native Hawaiian on her mother's side.	
James Proudstar (Warpath)	New Mutants	Also known as "Thunderbird", he is the younger brother of John Proudstar and the member of the New Mutants.	
Jeremy Swimming-Bear (Sea Urchin)	New Warriors	An enemy of Namor that wears a suit of armor to hunt for treasure.	
Ompa-pa	Oumpah-pah	The Native of the fictional Flatfeet tribe.	
Bunnokees	Popol Out West	A group of the Native American rabbits.	
Wildstar	R.E.B.E.L.S.	The ancestor of Dawnstar.	
Jake Red Cloud	Red Cloud Comics	He is a Native American of Quechua and Lakota ancestry who possesses mutant superhuman strength and speed.	
Little Beaver	Red Ryder	He is the juvenile Indian sidekick of Red Ryder.	
Thomas Thunderhead	Red Wolf		
Chief Redeye	Redeye	An overweight chief of the fictional Chickiepan tribe and the father of Tawnee and Pokey.	
Tanglefoot	Redeye	A cowardly and stupid warrior of the Chickiepan tribe.	
Asta Twelvetrees	Resident Alien	She is one of the nurses of alien Hah Re (aka Harry Vanderspeigle), and the daughter of the Mohawk shaman, who is able to partially see through his human alter-ego.	
Dashiell "Dash" Bad Horse	Scalped	Also known as Dashiell Bradford, he is a full-blooded Oglala Lakota who left the fictional Prairie Rose Indian Reservation at age fifteen before his return with a vengeance.	
Dino Poor Bear	Scalped	A young man who struggles to make a living on the reservation and encounters Dash at a meth lab.	
Gina Bad Horse	Scalped	The estranged mother of Dash and a longtime activist who pushes for the rights of the Indians.	
Chief Lincoln Red Crow (aka John Rayfield Bustill)	Scalped	A bullish Lakota elder who is the President of the Oglala Tribal Council and the Sheriff of the Tribal Police.	
Minnie Ha-Cha	Steve Roper and Mike Nomad	She is the girlfriend of Chief Wahoo.	
Chief Wahoo	Steve Roper and Mike Nomad	He is one of the main characters of the comic strip.	
Super-Chief (Saganowahna)	Superman	A member of Supermen of America.	
Lilyth	Tex	She was the daughter of the Navajo Chief and the wife of Tex Willer. She saved Tex from getting killed by her people (similar to Pocahontas) but later died of smallpox.	
Red Cloud	Tex	The Navajo shaman.	
Tex Willer (aka Eagle of the Night)	Tex	Besides being a Texas ranger, he becomes the tribal chief of the Navajo as well as the Bureau of Indian Affairs agent when he is married to the late Lilyth.	
Tiger Jack	Tex	The Navajo warrior.	
Moon Fawn	Tomahawk	She was the daughter of Chief Grey Elk of the Apaches, sister of Wise Owl and the wife of Tom Haukins.	
Nelvana of the Northern Lights	Triumph-Adventure Comics	Nelvana is the Inuk mythical being whose father Koliak the Mighty is the King of the Northern Lights. She is the first Canadian female superhero distinctly in Canada who has the ability to turn invisible, transmit people's minds and travel at light speed.	
Little Pigeon	Tumbleweeds	The daughter of the Poohawk Chief who is a "flower among the weeds". She has five suitors: Limpid Lizard, Green Gills, Lotsa Luck, Bucolic Buffalo, and Hulking Hawk.	
Turok	Turok, Son of Stone	A Native American warrior who first appeared in Four Color Comics.	
Ukala	Ukala	Protagonist of the comic strip.	
Forge	Uncanny X-Men	He is from the Cheyenne nation and the member of the X-Men.	
Michael Twoyoungmen (Shaman)	Uncanny X-Men	He is a member of the First Nations in the city of Calgary (specifically the Tsuu Tʼina) and a team member of Alpha Flight.	
Bright-Sky-After-Storm (Arak)	The Warlord	The son of Star-of-Dawn of the fictional Quontauka tribe.	
Ohiyesa "Pow Wow" Smith	Western Comics	The character who started in Detective Comics.	
Silver Fox	Wolverine	A member of the First Nation Blackfoot Confederacy who works for the Hydra terrorist organization and is the former love interest of Wolverine.	
Buffalo Seed	Yakari	A Sioux boy who dreams of becoming the greatest hunter.	
Rainbow	Yakari	A Sioux girl and a friend of Yakari.	
The-One-Who-Knows	Yakari	The chief and shaman of the Sioux tribe.	
Yakari	Yakari	The main title character who has the ability to talk to animals.	
Chief Zilverpijl/Silver Arrow	Zilverpijl	The eponymous character who is a resourceful and wise chief of the Kiowa; the blood brother of Falcon and Moonbeam.	

== Theatre ==
Native American	Title	Notes	Ref(s)
Lonesome Polecat	Li'l Abner	1956 Broadway musical based on Al Capp's comic strip of the same name. There is also the 1959 musical film adaptation.	
Metamora	Metamora; or, The Last of the Wampanoags	The member of the Wampanoags and the protagonist of the 1829 play by John Augustus Stone.	
Nehmeokee	Metamora; or, The Last of the Wampanoags	The wife of Metamora.	
"Chief" Bromden	One Flew Over the Cuckoo's Nest	1963 play by Dale Wasserman, based on Ken Kesey's novel of the same name.	
Chief Fighting Prawn	Peter and the Starcatcher	2009 play based on the children's novel of the same name.	
Tiger Lily	Peter Pan	1954 musical based on J. M. Barrie's 1904 theatre play, Peter Pan; or, the Boy Who Wouldn't Grow Up. The musical featured a racist song "Ugg-a-Wugg", which was ultimately cut from the NBC special adaptation, Peter Pan Live!	
Nat-u-Ritch	The Squaw Man	She was the daughter of Chief Taby-Wana of the Ute people, who saved Captain James Wynnegate (aka Jim Carson) from villainous outlaw Cash Hawkins. She married James, with whom she had a son Little Hal, but later sacrificed herself upon hearing that she would be arrested by the Marshals for killing Hawkins.	

== Film ==
=== Live action ===
Native American	Film title	Notes	Actor(s)	Ref(s)
Galasko	Alone yet Not Alone	A strong Indian warrior. Based on the novel of the same name by Tracy Leininger Craven.	Ozzie Torres	
Hannawoa	Alone yet Not Alone	The brother of Galasko.	Tony Wade	
Sam Birdwater	Americathon	A billionaire leader of the Natives.	Chief Dan George	
Massai	Apache	1954 film that was based on the novel Broncho Apache by Paul Wellman.	Burt Lancaster	
Chief Victorio	Apache Drums	The tribal leader of the Mescalero Apaches. Based on the unpublished story Stand at Spanish Boot by Harry Brown.	N/A	
Chato	Apache Warrior		George Keymas	
Chikisin	Apache Warrior		Dehl Berti	
Katawan	Apache Warrior	Better known as "Apache Kid", he is the protagonist of the film.	Keith Larsen	
Marteen	Apache Warrior		Rodolfo Acosta	
Chief Nantan	Apache Warrior		John Miljan	
Native American Chief	The Apple Dumpling Gang Rides Again		Nick Ramus	
Chief Chattez	Arrowhead	The Apache chief. Based on the novel Adobe Walls by W. R. Burnett.	Frank de Kova	
Toriana	Arrowhead	The son of Chief Chattez and one of the main characters of the film.	Jack Palance	
Atanarjuat	Atanarjuat: The Fast Runner	He is the "fast runner" in the prehistoric Nunavut who lives in Igloolik with his family, including his brother Amaqjuaq the "strong one" (Pakak Innuksuk). He also rivals with Oki (Peter-Henry Arnatsiaq) to even seek Atuat (Sylvia Ivalu) as a wife.	Natar Ungalaaq	
Chief Tahlequah	Badman's Territory		Chief Thundercloud	
Pvt. Shining Lighttower	Battle Cry	The Navajo phonetalkers. Based on the 1953 novel of the same name by Leon Uris.	Jonas Applegarth	
Pvt. Crazy Horse	Battle Cry	The Navajo phonetalkers. Based on the 1953 novel of the same name by Leon Uris.	Felix Noriego	
Tekehentahkhwa	Beans	Better known simply as "Beans", she is a Mohawk preteen girl who lives in the Kahnawake reserve and encounters the 1990 Oka Crisis at the settlement of Kanesatake.	Kiawentiio	
Pike Dexter	Big Eden	A shy and quiet Native American who owns the local general store and has a crush on gay artist Henry Hart (Arye Gross).	Eric Schweig	
Teal Eye	The Big Sky	Based on the novel of the same name by A. B. Guthrie, Jr.	Elizabeth Threatt	
Black Cloud	Black Cloud	A Navajo man and the titular character of the film.	Eddie Spears	
Sammi	Black Cloud	The girlfriend of Black Cloud.	Julia Jones	
Black Buffalo	The Black Dakotas	The son of Chief War Cloud, who desires the extermination of all of the white people.	Jay Silverheels	
Chief War Cloud	The Black Dakotas	Black Buffalo's father and the chief of the Sioux tribe.	John War Eagle	
Annuka	Black Robe	She is the daughter of Algonquin traveler Chomina, who falls in love with Daniel Davost (Aden Young) along their journey to a distant Huron village. Based on Brian Moore's novel of the same name.	Sandrine Holt	
Chomina	Black Robe	He is the Algonquin guide, and Annuka's father, who takes Daniel and Father Paul LaForgue (Lothaire Bluteau) to the Huron mission.	August Schellenberg	
Indian Chief	Blazing Saddles	The opening scene of this Western parody featured a Native American chief speaking in stereotypical Yiddish.	Mel Brooks (also the director of the film)	
Johnny Black Hawk	Bone Eater	A Native American who agitates for violence.	Adoni Maropis	
Sheriff Steve Evans	Bone Eater	He is the local sheriff who is half Native American.	Bruce Boxleitner	
Chief Storm Cloud	Bone Eater	The local Indian chief.	Michael Horse	
Tall Trees	Bone Tomahawk	An educated Native American who is called "the professor".	Zahn McClarnon	
Chief White Hand	Breakheart Pass	The tribal chief of the Natives. Based on the novel of the same name by Alistair MacLean.	Eddie Little Sky	
Black Hawk	Buffalo Bill in Tomahawk Territory		Chief Thundercloud	
Running Deer	Buffalo Bill in Tomahawk Territory		Rodd Redwing	
Chief White Cloud	Buffalo Bill in Tomahawk Territory		Chief Yowlachie	
Aristotle Joseph	The Business of Fancydancing	The Spokane man of the reservation in eastern Washington state.	Gene Tagaban	
Seymour Polatkin	The Business of Fancydancing	A gay Spokane poet and the main character.	Evan Adams	
Blackfoot People	Cattle Queen of Montana	Colorados; Natchakoa; Powhani; Starfire	Lance Fuller; Anthony Caruso; Rodd Redwing; Yvette Dugay	
White Bull Legrew	Cold Pursuit	A Ute drug lord and the rival of Trevor "Viking" Calcote (Tom Bateman). The 2019 remake of the 2014 Norwegian film In Order of Disappearance.	Tom Jackson	
Blue Eagle	The Cowboy and the Indians		Frank Lackteen	
Lakoma	The Cowboy and the Indians		Jay Silverheels	
Chief Long Arrow	The Cowboy and the Indians		Chief Yowlachie	
Lucy Broken Arm	The Cowboy and the Indians		Claudia Drake	
Black Knife	Cowboys & Aliens	The Chiricahua Apache chief. Based on the graphic novel of the same name.	Raoul Trujillo	
Ben Logan	Crooked Arrows	The traditionalist Tribal Chairman and the father of Joe Logan.	Gil Birmingham	
Joe Logan	Crooked Arrows	The mixed-blood Native American who is also known as "Logan the Legend".	Brandon Routh	
Nadie Logan	Crooked Arrows		Chelsea Ricketts	
Black Shawl	Dances with Wolves	1990 film based on the famous novel of the same name by Michael Blake.	Tantoo Cardinal	
Kicking Bird	Dances with Wolves	The Sioux medicine man.	Graham Greene	
Otter	Dances with Wolves		Michael Spears	
Smiles-A-Lot	Dances with Wolves	A Sioux youth.	Nathan Lee Chasing His Horse	
Stands-With-A-Fist	Dances with Wolves	The adoptive daughter of Kicking Bird.	Mary McDonnell	
Stone Calf	Dances with Wolves		Jimmy Herman	
Chief Ten Bears	Dances with Wolves		Floyd Westerman	
Wind-In-His-Hair	Dances with Wolves	A Sioux warrior.	Rodney A. Grant	
Worm	Dances with Wolves		Jason R. Lone Hill	
Jim Chee	The Dark Wind	Based on the novel of the same name by Tony Hillerman.	Lou Diamond Phillips	
Joe Leaphorn	The Dark Wind	Based on the novel of the same name by Tony Hillerman.	Fred Ward	
Black Wolf	Daughter of Dawn	An 83-minute-long silent film.	Jack Sankadota	
Dawn	Daughter of Dawn	The daughter of the chief of Kiowa and the main character.	Esther LeBarre	
Kiowa Chief	Daughter of Dawn		Hunting Horse	
Red Wing	Daughter of Dawn	These characters are portrayed by the children of Comanche leader Quanah Parker.	Wanada Parker	
White Eagle	Daughter of Dawn	These characters are portrayed by the children of Comanche leader Quanah Parker.	White Parker	
High Tree	Davy Crockett, Indian Scout		William Wilkerson	
Red Hawk	Davy Crockett, Indian Scout	The innocent partner of Davy Crockett (George Montgomery).	Phillip Reed	
Sleeping Fox	Davy Crockett, Indian Scout		Chief Thundercloud	
Brother Wolf	The Dead and the Damned	He is an Apache warrior who is accused of rape and joins bounty hunter Mortimer (David Lockhart) to survive the zombie hordes.	Rick Mora	
Nobody	Dead Man	A Native American who was forcibly raised by whites.	Gary Farmer	
Anna Hot Water	Dirty Dingus Magee	She is a lithe Indian companion of Dingus Magee (Frank Sinatra) and the daughter of Chief Crazy Blanket (Paul Fix). Based on the novel The Ballad of Dingus Magee by David Markson.	Michele Carey	
Hunter	The Doe Boy	A young Cherokee man who is a haemophiliac.	James Duval (adult); Andrew J. Ferchland (child)	
Marvin Fishinghawk	The Doe Boy		Gordon Tootoosis	
Pete Chasing Horse	Dreamkeeper	A Lakota elder and a storyteller.	August Schellenberg	
Sam Chasing Horse	Dreamkeeper	The father of Shane Chasing Horse.	Gil Birmingham	
Shane Chasing Horse	Dreamkeeper	The 17-years-old Lakota grandson of Pete Chasing Horse.	Eddie Spears	
Blue Back	Drums Along the Mohawk	Based on the novel of the same name by Walter D. Edmonds.	Chief John Big Tree	
Santana	El Condor	The Apache chief.	Iron Eyes Cody	
Chief Grey Bear	End of the Trail		Basil F. Heath	
Nurse St. Cloud	Ernest Goes to Camp	The granddaughter of Chief St. Cloud.	Victoria Racimo	
Old Indian 'Chief St. Cloud'	Ernest Goes to Camp	The Indian owner of Kamp Kikakee.	Iron Eyes Cody	
Chief Black Hawk	Fighting Pioneers		Chief Standing Bear	
Eagle Feathers	Fighting Pioneers		Chief Thundercloud	
Wa-No-Na	Fighting Pioneers	The daughter of Chief Black Hawk.	Ruth Mix	
Tall Eagle	Firewalker		Will Sampson	
Fish Hawk	Fish Hawk	1979 film based on the novel Old Fish Hawk by Mitchell F. Jayne.	Will Sampson	
Buffalo Horn	Flaming Star	Based on the novel of the same name by Clair Huffaker.	Rodolfo Acosta	
Pacer Burton	Flaming Star	He is a mixed-blood, son of the Kiowa woman and the Texan man.	Elvis Presley	
María Nicolasa Cruz	Foolish, Foolish, But Not so Much	Better known as "La India María", she is an indigenous Mexican woman who appears in 16 films from 1972 to 2014. She is also the main character of the spin-off television series, María, What an Aim!	María Elena Velasco	
Yaqui	Four Guns to the Border		Jay Silverheels	
Cora Smallhill	Four Sheets to the Wind	The mother of Cufe and Miri Smallhill.	Jeri Arredondo	
Cufe Smallhill	Four Sheets to the Wind	One of the main characters of the film.	Cody Lightning	
Frankie Smallhill	Four Sheets to the Wind		Richard Ray Whitman	
Miri Smallhill	Four Sheets to the Wind	The sister of Cufe Smallhill.	Tamara Podemski	
Grey Bear	Frontier Fury		Stanley Brown (uncredited)	
Nahalla	The Ghost Dance	The evil spirit of a long-dead warrior who possesses Aranjo, the local Indian shaman.	Henry Bal	
Grayeagle	Grayeagle	The man of the Cheyenne nation and the title character of the film.	Alex Cord	
Running Wolf	Grayeagle	The Cheyenne chief.	Paul Fix	
Scar	Grayeagle	A Shoshone warrior.	Jacob Daniels	
Standing Bear	Grayeagle	One of the main characters of the film.	Iron Eyes Cody	
Crow Chief	The Hallelujah Trail	The tribal chief of the Crow people.	Eddie Little Sky	
Chief Five Barrels	The Hallelujah Trail	One of the tribal Sioux chiefs.	Robert J. Wilke	
Chief Walks-Stooped-Over	The Hallelujah Trail	The second chief of the Sioux.	Martin Landau	
Sam Two Feathers	Harry and Tonto		Chief Dan George	
Acacia	Hex	The two daughters of the recently deceased Native American shaman.	Hillarie Thompson	
Oriole	Hex	The two daughters of the recently deceased Native American shaman.	Tina Herazo	
Hiawatha	Hiawatha	Hiawatha, 1913 silent film; Hiawatha (1952); Hiawatha, 1984 television film; Song of Hiawatha (1997); Based on the poem The Song of Hiawatha by Henry Wadsworth Longfellow.	Jesse Cornplanter (1913); Vince Edwards (1952); Frederick Warder (1984); Gary "Litefoot" Davis (1997)	
Minnehaha	Hiawatha	Hiawatha, (1913); Hiawatha (1952); Hiawatha (1984); Song of Hiawatha (1997)	Soon-Goot (1913); Yvette Dugay (1952); Terry Diab (1984); Irene Bedard (1997)	
Mudjekeewis	Hiawatha	Hiawatha (1952); Song of Hiawatha (1997)	Stuart Randall (1952); Russell Means (1997)	
Nokomis	Hiawatha	Hiawatha (1952); Hiawatha (1984); Song of Hiawatha (1997)	Katherine Emery (1952); Yvonne Bryceland (1984); Sheila Tousey (1997)	
Chief Megissogwon	Hiawatha	The leader of the Dakotah tribe and the father of Hiawatha.	Ian MacDonald	
John Russell	Hombre	1967 film based on Elmore Leonard's novel of the same name.	Paul Newman	
Black Hawk	Hostiles	He is the son of the Cheyenne Chief Yellow Hawk.	Adam Beach	
Elk Woman	Hostiles	The wife of Black Hawk and the sister-in-law of Living Woman.	Q'orianka Kilcher	
Little Bear	Hostiles	He is the son of Black Hawk and Elk Woman.	Xavier Horsechief	
Living Woman	Hostiles	She is the sister of Black Hawk and the daughter of Yellow Hawk.	Tanaya Beatty	
Yellow Hawk	Hostiles	Cheyenne Chief Yellow Hawk, the sickly and imprisoned war-chief and one of the main characters of the film; the father of Black Hawk and Living Woman and the grandfather of Little Bear.	Wes Studi	
Chief Little Pain-in-the-Neck	Hurry, Charlie, Hurry		Janette Fern	
Moaning Low	Hurry, Charlie, Hurry		Connie Montoya	
Chief Poison Arrow	Hurry, Charlie, Hurry		Noble Johnson	
Little Bear	The Indian in the Cupboard	1995 film based on the children's novel of the same name.	Litefoot	
Chief Yellow Snake	The Indians Are Coming	1930 serial film based on the book The Great West That Was by William "Buffalo Bill" Cody.	Chief Thunderbird (uncredited)	
Karana	Island of the Blue Dolphins	Based on the novel of the same name by Scott O'Dell.	Celia Kaye	
Ramo	Island of the Blue Dolphins	Karana's six-year-old brother.	Larry Domasin	
Paint-His-shirt-Red	Jeremiah Johnson	The chief of the Crow tribe. 1972 film partly based on the life of the legendary mountain man John Jeremiah Johnson, recounted in the books Crow Killer: The Saga of Liver-Eating Johnson by Raymond W. Thorp and Robert Bunker and Mountain Man by Vardis Fisher.	Joaquín Martínez	
Swan	Jeremiah Johnson	She is the daughter of Chief Two-Tongues Lebreaux (Richard Angarola) of the Christianized Flathead tribe, who has been given as a bride to Jeremiah Johnson (Robert Redford).	Delle Bolton	
Johnny Firecloud	Johnny Firecloud	The Vietnam War Native.	Victor Mohica	
Nenya	Johnny Firecloud	The teacher on the reservation.	Sacheen Littlefeather	
Chatow	Jonathan of the Bears		Knifewing Segura	
Shaya	Jonathan of the Bears	An Indian squaw.	Melody Robertson	
Chief Tawanka	Jonathan of the Bears		Floyd Westerman	
Stanley Pike	Journey Through Rosebud		Eddie Little Sky	
Attean	Keeping the Promise	The television film based on the children's novel The Sign of the Beaver by Elizabeth George Speare.	William Lightning	
Chief Saknis	Keeping the Promise	The grandfather of Attean.	Gordon Tootoosis	
Moki	King of the Grizzlies	1970 film based on the novel The Biography of a Grizzly.	John Yesno	
Chingachgook	The Last of the Mohicans	The Last of the Mohicans (1920); The Last of the Mohicans (1936); The Last of the Mohicans (1977); The Last of the Mohicans (1992); Based on the novel of the same name by James Fenimore Cooper.	Theodore Lorch (1920); Robert Barrat (1936); Ned Romero (1977); Russell Means (1992)	
Magua	The Last of the Mohicans	The Last of the Mohicans (1920); The Last of the Mohicans (1936); The Last of the Mohicans (1977); The Last of the Mohicans (1992); Based on the novel of the same name by James Fenimore Cooper.	Wallace Beery (1920); Bruce Cabot (1936); Robert Tessier (1977); Wes Studi (1992)	
Uncas	The Last of the Mohicans	The Last of the Mohicans (1920); The Last of the Mohicans (1936); The Last of the Mohicans (1977); The Last of the Mohicans (1992); Based on the novel of the same name by James Fenimore Cooper.	Alan Roscoe (1920); Phillip Reed (1936); Don Shanks (1977); Eric Schweig (1992)	
Laughing Boy	Laughing Boy	The titular character of the film based on the novel of the same name by Oliver La Farge.	Ramon Novarro	
Slim Girl/Lily	Laughing Boy	The Indian maiden who was raised by whites.	Lupe Vélez	
The Eagle Boy	The Legend of the Boy and the Eagle	A Hopi boy who defies tribal law and frees a sacrificial, sacred eagle.	Stanford Lomakema	
Lonesome Polecat	Li'l Abner	1940 film based on the comic strips of the same name by Al Capp.	Buster Keaton	
Chief Cuyloga	The Light in the Forest	The Indian chief in Pennsylvania who adopts Johnny Butler (James MacArthur), renaming him "True-Son". 1958 Disney film based on Conrad Richter's novel of the same name.	Joseph Calleia	
Half Arrow	The Light in the Forest	True-Son's Indian cousin who accompanies him to the white society.	Rafael Campos	
Burns-Red-in-the-Sun	Little Big Man	1970 film based on the 1964 novel of the same name by Thomas Berger.	Steve Shemayne	
Little Horse	Little Big Man	1970 film based on the 1964 novel of the same name by Thomas Berger.	Robert Little Star	
Old Lodge Skins	Little Big Man	The good-hearted tribal leader of the Cheyenne nation.	Chief Dan George	
Shadow-That-Comes-in-Sight	Little Big Man	A Cheyenne brave.	Ruben Moreno	
Sunshine	Little Big Man	The daughter of Shadow-That-Comes-in-Sight.	Aimée Eccles	
Younger Bear	Little Big Man		Cal Bellini (adult); Steve Miranda (young)	
Tonto	The Lone Ranger	The Lone Ranger, the 1938 serial film; The Legend of the Lone Ranger (1952); The Lone Ranger (1956); The Lone Ranger and the Lost City of Gold (1958); The Legend of the Lone Ranger (1981); The Lone Ranger (2013); Based on the WXYZ radio and the television series of the same name.	Chief Thundercloud (1938); Jay Silverheels (1952–58); Michael Horse (1981); Johnny Depp (2013)	
Angry Horse	The Lone Ranger (1956)		Michael Ansara	
Chief Red Hawk	The Lone Ranger (1956)		Frank de Kova	
Chief Big Bear	The Lone Ranger (2013)	The elderly tribal leader of Comanche.	Saginaw Grant	
Whitestar	The Lost Empire	A woman of the Indian reservation who joins the mission with her old friend Angel Wolfe (Melanie Vincz).	Raven De La Croix	
Chief Wannatoka	Love at Stake		Nick Ramus	
Denali	The Magnificent Seven	An exiled Comanche warrior.	Jonathan Joss	
Red Harvest	The Magnificent Seven	The Comanche warrior who is the youngest of the Seven.	Martin Sensmeier	
John Morgan/Shunkawakan	A Man Called Horse; The Return of a Man Called Horse; Triumphs of a Man Called Horse	He was originally an English aristocrat until he became the chieftain of the Sioux tribe. Based on the short story of the same name by Dorothy M. Johnson.	Richard Harris	
Batise	A Man Called Horse	He is a half-breed Native whose mother was Sioux and father was French.	Jean Gascon	
Buffalo Cow Head	A Man Called Horse	An old squaw.	Judith Anderson	
Running Deer	A Man Called Horse	The lovely young sister of Chief Yellow Hand.	Corinna Tsopei	
Yellow Hand	A Man Called Horse	Chief Yellow Hand of the Sioux tribe.	Manu Tupou	
Chief Yellowstone	Massacre River		Iron Eyes Cody	
Yellow Hawk	Masterson of Kansas	The peace-seeking Indian chief.	Jay Silverheels	
Chief Dan	Missionary Man		Richard Ray Whitman	
J.J.	Missionary Man	The local Native American carpenter who is dead. Mention only.	N/A	
Junior	Missionary Man	The teenage nephew of the late J.J.	John D. Montoya	
Kiowa	Missionary Man	The 15-year-old sister of Junior.	Chelsea Ricketts	
Assistant Chief Lance	Missionary Man		Titos Menchaca	
Nancy	Missionary Man	The mother of Kiowa and Junior and the sister of J.J.	Kateri Walker	
White Deer	Missionary Man	The father of J.J. and Nancy and the grandfather of Kiowa and Junior.	August Schellenberg	
Nightwolf	Mortal Kombat Annihilation	Based on the Mortal Kombat video game series.	Litefoot	
Cross Otter	The Mountain Men		Cal Bellini	
Heavy Eagle	The Mountain Men	The ruthless Blackfoot warrior.	Stephen Macht	
Chief Iron Belly	The Mountain Men		Victor Jory	
Medicine Wolf	The Mountain Men		David Ackroyd	
Running Moon	The Mountain Men	The wife of Heavy Eagle.	Victoria Racimo	
Black Cloud	My Pal, the King		Jim Thorpe	
Ahbleza	The Mystic Warrior	The young brave of Mahto, the fictional Lakota-speaking tribe.	Robert Beltran (adult); Doug Toby (young)	
Heyatawin	The Mystic Warrior		Devon Ericson	
Chief Olepi	The Mystic Warrior	The chief of the Mahto tribe and the father of Anbleza.	Nick Ramus	
Pesla	The Mystic Warrior		James Remar	
Tonweya	The Mystic Warrior		Rion Hunter (adult); David Yanez (young)	
Wanagi	The Mystic Warrior	The ancient seer of Mahto.	Ron Soble	
Navajo Joe	Navajo Joe	He is the solitary Navajo rider who opposes the group of bandits responsible for murdering his tribe.	Burt Reynolds	
Spotted Bear	The Nebraskan		Jay Silverheels	
Wingfoot	The Nebraskan	One of the main characters of the film.	Maurice Jara	
Yellow Knife	The Nebraskan		Pat Hogan	
Mike	Never Cry Wolf	He was adopted by Ootek and Woman. Based on the autobiography of the same name by Farley Mowat.	Samson Jorah	
Ootek	Never Cry Wolf	A traveling Inuk.	Zachary Ittimangnaq	
John Goodfeather	Older than America (American Evil)	He is the Fond du Lac Indian Reservation police officer, the son of medicine man Pete Goodfeather (Dennis Banks), and the fiancé of Rain.	Adam Beach	
Rain Many Lightnings O'Rourke	Older than America (American Evil)	She is an Ojibwe elementary school teacher and John's fiancée. Her maternal aunt, Barbara "Auntie Apple" O'Rourke (Tantoo Cardinal), is a devout Catholic who turns to local priest Father Dimitri Bartoli (Stephen Yoakam) for any guidance.	Georgina Lightning (also the director and writer of the film)	
Richard Two Rivers	Older than America (American Evil)	He is the Indian Reservation radio DJ and talk show host.	Wes Studi	
Steve Klamath	Older than America (American Evil)	He is a Native American mayoral candidate who Richard Two Rivers outwardly gives his campaign airtime.	Glen Gould	
Aivaaq	On the Ice	The two survived Iñupiat teenagers.	Frank Qutuq Irelan	
Qalli	On the Ice	The two survived Iñupiat teenagers.	Josiah Patkotak	
"Chief" Bromden	One Flew Over the Cuckoo's Nest	1975 film based on the 1962 novel of the same name by Ken Kesey.	Will Sampson	
Blue Feather	One Little Indian		Lois Red Elk	
Jimmy Wolf	One Little Indian		Jay Silverheels	
Mark	One Little Indian	A young boy who was raised by an Indian and is on the run with his camel companion, Rosie, trying to find his tribe.	Clay O'Brien	
Old Indian	One Little Indian		Richard Hale	
Little Moonlight	The Outlaw Josey Wales	A young Navajo woman. Based on the Western novel The Rebel Outlaw: Josey Wales by Forrest Carter.	Geraldine Keams	
Lone Watie	The Outlaw Josey Wales	An elder Cherokee.	Chief Dan George	
Chief Iron Eyes	The Paleface		Iron Eyes Cody	
Wapato	The Paleface	The medicine man.	Henry Brandon	
Chief Yellow Feather	The Paleface		Chief Yowlachie	
Pathfinder	Pathfinder	The elder chief of the Native tribe and the title character of the film.	Russell Means	
Starfire	Pathfinder	The daughter of the Pathfinder.	Moon Bloodgood	
Chief Great Big Little Panther	Peter Pan	Peter Pan, 1924 American silent film.; Pan, 2015 American film.; Based on the 1904 play Peter Pan; or, the Boy Who Wouldn't Grow Up and the 1911 novel Peter and Wendy by J. M. Barrie.	Jack Charles (2015)	
Tiger Lily	Peter Pan	Peter Pan (1924); Peter Pan, 2003 American film.; Neverland, 2003 indie film.; Pan (2015); Peter Pan & Wendy (2023)	Anna May Wong (1924); Carson Gray (2003, USA); Ray Garcia (2003, Indie); Rooney Mara (2015); Alyssa Wapanatahk (2023)	
Blue Feather	The Phantom Rider	The Native sidekick of the Phantom Rider.	George J. Lewis	
Phantom Rider	The Phantom Rider	He is a masquerade of the main protagonist, Dr. Jim Sterling.	Robert Kent	
Chief Yellow Wolf	The Phantom Rider		Chief Thundercloud	
Taylor	Poltergeist II: The Other Side	The Native American shaman.	Will Sampson	
Buddy Red Bow	Powwow Highway	The two Northern Cheyenne men from Lame Deer, Montana who embark on an open road journey of self-discovery. Based on the 1979 novel of the same name by David Seals.	A Martinez	
Philbert Bono	Powwow Highway	The two Northern Cheyenne men from Lame Deer, Montana who embark on an open road journey of self-discovery. Based on the 1979 novel of the same name by David Seals.	Gary Farmer	
Eagle Feather	The Prairie	Based on the novel of the same name by James Fenimore Cooper.	Chief Thundercloud	
Running Deer	The Prairie	Based on the novel of the same name by James Fenimore Cooper.	Jay Silverheels	
Naru	Prey	She is the fierce warrior of the Comanche tribe, and the sister of Taabe (Dakota Beaver), who along with her Carolina dog companion Sarii stalks the prey of the titular alien within Lawton, Oklahoma, based on the Predator franchise.	Amber Midthunder	
Wasape	Prey	He is a Comanche hunter who looks down on Naru.	Stormee Kipp	
Running Wolf	The Quick and the Dead	1987 television film based on the novel of the same name by Louis L'Amour.	Larry Sellers	
Little Beaver	Red Ryder	Several film adaptions of the Western comic strip Red Ryder have been made throughout the 1940s. Here are some examples: The Adventures of Red Ryder, the 1940 film serial; Tucson Raiders (1944); Great Stagecoach Robbery (1945); California Gold Rush (1946); Vigilantes of Boomtown (1947); Cowboy and the Prizefighter (1949)	Tommy Cook (1940); Robert Blake (1944–47); Don Reynolds (1949)	
Corn Blossom	Redskin	The sweetheart of Wing Foot.	Julie Carter (young woman); Lorraine Rivero (child)	
Navajo Jim	Redskin		Tully Marshall (adult); George Walker (teenager)	
Wing Foot	Redskin	A young Navajo man and the main character of the film.	Richard Dix (adult); Philip Anderson (child)	
Chief White Cloud	Renegade Girl		Chief Thundercloud	
Hank Storm	Renegades		Lou Diamond Phillips	
Red Crow	Renegades	The father of Hank Storm.	Floyd Westerman	
Chief Red Cloud	Revolt at Fort Laramie	The tribal leader of the Great Sioux Nation.	Eddie Little Sky	
Honchwah	Revolution		Larry Sellers	
Ongwata	Revolution		Graham Greene	
Chief Screaming Eagle	The Ridiculous 6	A Native American chief who adopts Tommy Stockburn (Adam Sandler), one of the six Stockburn brothers who the Indian tribe calls him "White Knife".	Saginaw Grant	
Smoking Fox	The Ridiculous 6	A Native American woman who has been arranged to marry Tommy Stockburn.	Julia Jones	
Chief Eagle Feather	Romance of the West		Chief Thundercloud	
Little Brown Jug	Romance of the West		Don Reynolds	
Chief Grey Wolf	Rustlers of Red Dog	1935 serial remake of The Indians Are Coming, based on the book The Great West That Was by William "Buffalo Bill" Cody.	Chief Thundercloud	
Chief Scarface	Rustlers of Red Dog	1935 serial remake of The Indians Are Coming, based on the book The Great West That Was by William "Buffalo Bill" Cody.	Jim Thorpe	
Chief Longfeather	Santa Fe		Chief Thundercloud	
Cajou	Saskatchewan	The Cree half-brother of Thomas O'Rourke (Alan Ladd).	Jay Silverheels	
Chief Dark Cloud	Saskatchewan		Anton Moreno	
Spotted Eagle	Saskatchewan		Anthony Caruso	
Jim Aherne Jr./Warbonnet	The Savage	He was raised by the Sioux Natives.	Charlton Heston (adult); Orly Lindgren (child)	
Running Dog	The Savage		Don Porter	
Chief Yellow Eagle	The Savage	The tribal chief of the Great Sioux Nation.	Ian MacDonald	
Apaches	Savage Sam	Comanche Chief; Broken Nose; Bandy Legs; Young Warrior; Based on the children's novel of the same name.	Dean Fredericks; Pat Hogan; Rodolfo Acosta; Rafael Campos	
Chief Cicatriz (Scar)	The Searchers	The villainous chief of the Nawyecka Comanches who seeks revenge on the white people for killing his sons by kidnapping Debbie Edwards (Natalie Wood). Based on the 1954 novel of the same name by Alan Le May.	Henry Brandon	
Matuwir	Seven Cities of Gold	The son of the local chief. Based on the novel The Nine Days of Father Serra by Isabelle Gibson Ziegler.	Jeffrey Hunter	
Ula	Seven Cities of Gold	The sister of Matuwir and the local chief's daughter.	Rita Moreno	
Falling Leaves	Shanghai Noon	Also referred to as the Indian Wife, she is the daughter of the Sioux chief, who has been accidentally engaged to Chon Wang (Jackie Chan).	Brandon Merrill	
Chief Pony-That-Walks	She Wore a Yellow Ribbon	One of the main characters of the film.	Chief John Big Tree	
Red Shirt	She Wore a Yellow Ribbon		Noble Johnson	
Chief Sky Eagle	She Wore a Yellow Ribbon		Basil F. Heath	
Chief Cyclone	Silly Billies		Chief Thunderbird	
Trigger	Silly Billies		Ethan Laidlaw	
Clifford Rainfather	Sioux City	The grandfather of Jesse Goldman.	Apesanahkwat	
Dawn Rainfeather	Sioux City	The biological mother of Jesse.	Tantoo Cardinal	
Jesse Rainfeather Goldman	Sioux City	A young Lakota Sioux who was adopted by a wealthy Jewish couple, Douglas (Adam Roarke) and Leah Goldman (Melinda Dillon).	Lou Diamond Phillips (also a director of the film); Ronny Quintanar, Jr. (young)	
Russell White	Sioux City		Gary Farmer	
Mogie Yellow Lodge	Skins	Based on the novel of the same name by Adrian C. Louis.	Graham Greene	
Ruby Yellow Lodge	Skins	Based on the novel of the same name by Adrian C. Louis.	Eric Schweig	
Gabriel Jimmyboy	Smith!	One of the main characters of the film.	Frank Ramírez	
Suzy Song	Smoke Signals	She is a friend of Thomas' late father. Based on the short story collection The Lone Ranger and Tonto Fistfight in Heaven.	Irene Bedard	
Thomas Builds-the-Fire	Smoke Signals	One of the main characters of the film.	Evan Adams	
Victor Joseph	Smoke Signals		Adam Beach	
Running Fox	Soldier Blue	Based on the novel Arrow in the Sun by T. V. Olsen.	Jorge Russek	
Spotted Wolf	Soldier Blue	The Cheyenne chief.	Jorge Rivero	
Mattotaupa	The Sons of Great Bear	The chief of the Bears clan of Oglala Lakotas.	Adolf Peter Hoffmann	
Tokei-ihto	The Sons of Great Bear	The war chieftain of the Bear Band and the main character of the film; the son of Mattotaupa.	Gojko Mitić	
Nat-u-Ritch	The Squaw Man (1914); The Squaw Man (1918); The Squaw Man (1931)	The film adaptations based on the 1905 play of the same name.	Red Wing (1914); Ann Little (1918); Lupe Vélez (1931)	
Chief Taby-Wana	The Squaw Man (1914); The Squaw Man (1918); The Squaw Man (1931)	The film adaptations based on the 1905 play of the same name.	Joseph Singleton (1914); Noah Beery (1918); Mitchell Lewis (1931)	
Bloody Knife	Stolen Women: Captured Hearts	1997 television film loosely based on the life of Anna Morgan who was captured by the Cheyenne Indians.	Apesanahkwat	
Cetan	Stolen Women: Captured Hearts	A young Native who is half white from his father the soldier.	William Lightning	
Chief Luta	Stolen Women: Captured Hearts		Saginaw Grant	
Tokalah	Stolen Women: Captured Hearts	The tribal leader of the band of Lakota Indians.	Michael Greyeyes	
T. Hawk	Street Fighter	He is depicted as a Native American military sergeant of the Allied Nations Peacekeeping Force under Colonel Guile, in the 1994 film based on the video game series of the same name.	Gregg Rainwater	
Grandma Maisy Blue Legs	Thunderheart	Two of the tribal elders.	Sarah Brave	
Grandpa Sam Reaches	Thunderheart	Two of the tribal elders.	Ted Thin Elk	
Leo Fast Elk	Thunderheart	Member of the tribal council of the Native Americans in South Dakota who was murdered.	Allan R. J. Joseph	
Maggie Eagle Bear	Thunderheart	The Indian schoolteacher and political activist.	Sheila Tousey	
Walter Crow Horse	Thunderheart	The Indian tribal police officer.	Graham Greene	
Wolf Ortiz	Tiger Eyes	A mysterious Native climber. Based on the novel of the same name by Judy Blume.	Tatanka Means	
Injun Joe	Tom Sawyer	Huck and Tom (1918); Tom Sawyer (1930); The Adventures of Tom Sawyer (1938); Tom Sawyer (1973); Tom and Huck (1995); Tom Sawyer & Huckleberry Finn (2014); Band of Robbers (2015); Based on the novel The Adventures of Tom Sawyer by Mark Twain.	Frank Lanning (1918); Charles Stevens (1930); Victor Jory (1938); Kunu Hank (1973); Eric Schweig (1995); Kaloian Vodenicharov (2014); Stephen Lang (2015)	
Prairie Flower	Tonka	1958 film based on the book Comanche: Story of America's Most Heroic Horse by David Appel.	Joy Page	
Chief Sitting Bull	Tonka	1958 film based on the book Comanche: Story of America's Most Heroic Horse by David Appel.	John War Eagle	
Spotted Tail	Tonka	1958 film based on the book Comanche: Story of America's Most Heroic Horse by David Appel.	Eddie Little Sky	
Strong Bear	Tonka	1958 film based on the book Comanche: Story of America's Most Heroic Horse by David Appel.	Rafael Campos	
White Bull	Tonka	A young Sioux and the main character of the film.	Sal Mineo	
Yellow Bear	Tonka	The Sioux cousin of White Bull.	H. M. Wynant	
Taha Aki	The Twilight Saga	He was one of the last spirit chiefs and the first shape-shifter of the Quileute tribe. Based on the Twilight novels by Stephenie Meyer.	Byron Chief-Moon	
Billy Black	The Twilight Saga	The elder of the Quileute tribe.	Gil Birmingham	
Jacob Black	The Twilight Saga	An attractive protector of the Quileute tribe and the main character of the film series.	Taylor Lautner	
Harry Clearwater	The Twilight Saga	He was the elder of the Quileute tribe who died of a heart attack in New Moon.	Graham Greene	
Leah Clearwater	The Twilight Saga	She is the daughter of Harry and Sue Clearwater, who is the only known female shape-shifting wolf in the history of the Quileute tribe.	Julia Jones	
Seth Clearwater	The Twilight Saga	Leah's younger brother who transforms into a wolf around the same time as his sister.	Boo Boo Stewart	
Sam Uley	The Twilight Saga	He is the Alpha, or the leader, and the oldest member of the La Push pack; the ex-boyfriend of Leah Clearwater. When he was young, Sam and his mother Allison had been abandoned by his father Joshua.	Chaske Spencer	
Guyasuta	Unconquered	Chief Guyasuta of the Senecas. Based on the real-life Guyasuta.	Boris Karloff	
Hannah	Unconquered	The daughter of Chief Guyasuta and the wife of Martin Garth (Howard Da Silva).	Katherine DeMille	
Pontiac	Unconquered	Based on the real-life Pontiac.	Robert Warwick (uncredited)	
Red Corn	Unconquered		Iron Eyes Cody	
Sioto	Unconquered	The tribal medicine man.	Marc Lawrence	
Blandy	The Vanishing American	He was raised by the Navajos. Based on the 1925 novel of the same name by Zane Grey.	Scott Brady	
The Navajos	The Vanishing American	Chief Etenia; Yashi; Beeteia; Quah-Tan; Coshanta	Julian Rivero; Gloria Castillo; Jay Silverheels; Charles Stevens; George Keymas	
Chief	Wagons East	The unnamed tribal leader of the Sioux territory.	Russell Means	
Little Feather	Wagons East		Rodney A. Grant	
Chief Maygro	War Arrow	The tribal chief of the Seminole tribe.	Henry Brandon	
Pino	War Arrow		Dennis Weaver	
Santanta	War Arrow		Jay Silverheels	
Ben Crowkiller/Dead Crow Wolf	War Party	The Blackfeet Indians.	Dennis Banks	
Freddie Man Wolf	War Party	The Blackfeet Indians.	Saginaw Grant	
The Crow	War Party	The Blackfeet Indians.	Rodney A. Grant	
Sonny Crowkiller	War Party	They are three young Blackfeet men who fight for freedom during the battle between Blackfeet Indians and U.S. Cavalry.	Billy Wirth	
Skitty Harris	War Party	They are three young Blackfeet men who fight for freedom during the battle between Blackfeet Indians and U.S. Cavalry.	Kevin Dillon	
Warren Cutfoot	War Party	They are three young Blackfeet men who fight for freedom during the battle between Blackfeet Indians and U.S. Cavalry.	Tim Sampson	
Hannoc	When the Redskins Rode	The Indian prince of the Delaware tribe.	Jon Hall	
Morna	When the Redskins Rode	The intended bride of Hannoc.	Sherry Moreland	
Chief Shingiss	When the Redskins Rode	The leader of the Delaware tribe and the father of Hannoc.	Pedro de Cordoba	
Grey Beaver	White Fang	1991 film based on the novel of the same name.	Pius Savage	
Lily Joseph	White Fang 2: Myth of the White Wolf	The Haida girl and one of the main characters of the film sequel to White Fang.	Charmaine Craig	
Moses Joseph	White Fang 2: Myth of the White Wolf	The chief of the Haida tribe in Alaska and the uncle of Lily.	Al Harrington	
Peter Joseph	White Fang 2: Myth of the White Wolf	The son of Chief Moses and Katrin Joseph, and the cousin of Lily, who was shot and killed while distracting the gunman.	Anthony Ruivivar	
American Horse	White Feather	The Cheyenne tribesman. Based on the story My Great-Aunt Appearing Day in Lilliput magazine by John Prebble.	Hugh O'Brian	
Appearing Day	White Feather	The fiancée of American Horse and the love interest of Josh Tanner (Robert Wagner).	Debra Paget	
Chief Broken Hand	White Feather	The chief of Cheyenne.	Eduard Franz	
Little Dog	White Feather	The brother of Appearing Day.	Jeffrey Hunter	
Buckskin Frank	Wild West Days	The Indian who is one of the henchmen of Matt Keeler (Russell Simpson). The film serial based on the novel by W. R. Burnett.	Charles Stevens	
Chief Red Hatchet	Wild West Days	The tribal chief who is one of Matt Keeler's henchmen.	Chief Thunderbird	
Ben Shoyo	Wind River	The tirbal police chief who assists agents Cory Lambert (Jeremy Renner) and Jane Banner (Elizabeth Olsen) to solve the possible homicide of a young Arapaho woman, Natalie Hanson (Kelsey Asbille).	Graham Greene	
Martin Hanson	Wind River	The resident of the Wind River Indian Reservation whose daughter Natalie has died from inhaling subzero air in the winter. He lives with his wife Annie (Althea Sam) and son Chip (Martin Sensmeier).	Gil Birmingham	
Jim Thorpe	Windrunner	A Native football star who is a ghost.	Russell Means	
Crow Brother	Windwalker		Nick Ramus	
Smiling Wolf	Windwalker	One of the main characters of the film.	Nick Ramus	
Tashina	Windwalker	The wife of Windwalker and the mother of Smiling Wolf and the Crow Warrior.	Serene Hedin	
Windwalker	Windwalker	The titular character who is the father of Smiling Wolf and the Crow Warrior.	Trevor Howard (adult); James Remar (young)	
Agnes First Raise	Winter in the Blood	2013 film produced by author Sherman Alexie, based on the 1974 novel of the same name by James Welch.	Julia Jones	
Lame Bull	Winter in the Blood	2013 film produced by author Sherman Alexie, based on the 1974 novel of the same name by James Welch.	Gary Farmer	
Virgil First Raise	Winter in the Blood	The main character of the film.	Chaske Spencer	
Yellow Calf	Winter in the Blood		Saginaw Grant	
Pale Flower	Winterhawk	The Indian wife of the trapper, Guthrie (Leif Erickson).	Sacheen Littlefeather	
Winterhawk	Winterhawk	The Blackfoot chief and the title character of the film.	Michael Dante	

=== Animation ===
Native American	Film title	Notes	Voice actor(s)	Ref(s)
Indian Mice	An American Tail: Fievel Goes West	The tribe of the Native American mice who mistake Tiger for a god.	various	
Cholena	An American Tail: The Treasure of Manhattan Island	The Lenape girl mouse and the daughter of Chief Wulisso; the main character of the film. She is a parody of Pocahontas.	Elaine Bilstad (speaking); Leeza Miller (singing)	
Hunter	Anima	An unnamed Native American hunter and warrior who searches for his prey.	José Vicente	
Chief	Asterix Conquers America		Sylvain Lemarie	
Medicine Man	Asterix Conquers America		Thomas Piper	
Minihooha/Ha-Tschi	Asterix Conquers America	The daughter of the chief.	Kristiane Backer	
Chakashi	Atlantis: Milo's Return	A Native American wind spirit.	Floyd Westerman	
Dr. Joshua Strongbear Sweet	Atlantis: The Lost Empire; Atlantis: Milo's Return	He is a medic of Native American and African American descent.	Phil Morris	
Kenai	Brother Bear; Brother Bear 2	The 2003 Disney animated film about an Alaskan Native young man who is transformed into a grizzly bear by the Great Spirits, accused of pursuing the one that had killed his older brother Sitka. In the 2006 direct-to-video sequel, Kenai is married to his childhood friend Nita, the daughter of Chief Chilkoot of another Alaskan Native tribe.	Joaquin Phoenix (original); Patrick Dempsey (sequel)	
Redskin Indians	Californy 'er Bust	They are a group of the Native American dogs who bear the striking resemblance of Goofy in the 1945 Disney short film.	N/A	
Daisy June	The Daffy Duckaroo	An Indian girl who is actually a New Yorker. The 1942 Looney Tunes short film starring Daffy Duck.	Sara Berner	
Little Beaver	The Daffy Duckaroo	A hulking Indian boyfriend of Daisy June.	Mel Blanc	
Thunder	Flood	An animated short film about a young Native Canadian woman who combats the flood of lies and threats to other indigenous peoples spawned by European colonization of North America.	N/A	
Desert Flower	The Good, the Bad, and Huckleberry Hound	This animated Western parody television film produced by Hanna-Barbera includes a subplot of the cartoon star Huckleberry Hound falling for Desert Flower, the daughter of the canine Native American chief.	B. J. Ward	
Indian Fleas	A Horse Fly Fleas	A group of the stereotypical Native American fleas that inhabit the dog. The 1947 Looney Tunes short film featuring A. Flea.	Mel Blanc	
Watuna	The Legend of the North Wind	One of the main characters of this Spanish animated fantasy who is the descendant of the Mi'kmaq Natives.	Luz Enparanza (Basque); Chelo Vivares (Spanish); Daniel Brochu (English)	
David Kawena	Lilo & Stitch; Stitch! The Movie; Lilo & Stitch 2: Stitch Has a Glitch; Leroy & Stitch	David is a Native Hawaiian professional surfer and fire performer in the island of Kauaʻi. He is the boyfriend of Nani Pelekai and a good friend to Lilo Pelekai.	Jason Scott Lee (original and Stitch Has a Glitch); Dee Bradley Baker (Stitch! The Movie and Lilo & Stitch: The Series	
Lilo Pelekai	Lilo & Stitch; Stitch! The Movie; Lilo & Stitch 2: Stitch Has a Glitch; Leroy & Stitch	Lilo is a lonely young Native Hawaiian orphan girl who lives in the fictional Kokaua Town on Kauaʻi with her older sister Nani Pelekai. She discovers, adopts, and makes friend with Stitch, a mischievous alien who she initially mistakes for a dog.	Daveigh Chase (most films and Lilo & Stitch: The Series); Dakota Fanning (Lilo & Stitch 2: Stitch Has a Glitch)	
Nani Pelekai	Lilo & Stitch; Stitch! The Movie; Lilo & Stitch 2: Stitch Has a Glitch; Leroy & Stitch	Nani is the older sister and legal guardian of Lilo Pelekai. She struggles to be a mother figure to her rambunctious sister after the deaths of their parents but works hard to prove that she is capable in the role. She allowed Lilo to adopt Stitch, unaware of his alien origin.	Tia Carrere	
Hiawatha	Little Hiawatha	A Silly Symphony animated short film produced by Walt Disney, inspired by The Song of Hiawatha poem by Henry Wadsworth Longfellow.	N/A	
Manili	The Little Polar Bear	Also known as Lena in English dub, she is an Inuit girl who lives with her wise grandmother in a small village. She helps Lars the Polar Bear solving a mystery of the fish scarcity and saving the Artic from the Black Mouth submarine.	Vanessa Petruo (original German); Kimberly J. Brown (English dub)	
Indian Cats	Peter-No-Tail in Americat	They are a group of Native American cats who use magic to give Peter-No-Tail a long, golden tail, earning him the alias "Peter Gold-Tail".	various	
Big Chief	Peter Pan	The 1953 Disney animated film based on J. M. Barrie's Peter Pan; or, the Boy who Wouldn't Grow Up. The Native Americans in this film are utterly controversial for the depiction of their exaggerated stereotypical culture, as well as the most racist song "What Makes the Red Man Red?".	Candy Candido	
Squaw	Peter Pan	The 1953 Disney animated film based on J. M. Barrie's Peter Pan; or, the Boy who Wouldn't Grow Up. The Native Americans in this film are utterly controversial for the depiction of their exaggerated stereotypical culture, as well as the most racist song "What Makes the Red Man Red?".	June Foray	
Tiger Lily	Peter Pan	The daughter of the Big Chief and the "princess" of the Redskins. In the Disney version, Tiger Lily is unable to speak but appears to be much more realistic look, compared to the literally red-skinned Indians.	N/A	
Indian Wolves	Pioneers Days	The wolf-type Native Americans who plan for war against settlers, in the 1930 Disney short film starring Mickey Mouse and Minnie Mouse.	N/A	
Windlifter	Planes: Fire & Rescue	The anthropomorphic Sikorsky S-64 Skycrane helicopter of Native American heritage who can hoist a huge tank of fire retardant or dozens of trees.	Wes Studi	
Kekata	Pocahontas	The shaman of the Powhatan tribe.	Gordon Tootoosis (speaking); Jim Cummings (singing)	
Kocoum	Pocahontas	He was a strong and serious warrior of the Powhatan tribe and the fiancé of Pocahontas. Loosely based on the real-life Kocoum.	James Apaumut Fall	
Nakoma	Pocahontas; Pocahontas II: Journey to a New World	She is the best friend of Pocahontas.	Michelle St. John	
Pocahontas	Pocahontas; Pocahontas II: Journey to a New World	Loosely based on the real-life Pocahontas, she serves as an adventurous Indian princess of the Powhatan tribe, which is why she is officially included for the Disney Princess franchise to the English.	Irene Bedard (speaking); Judy Kuhn (singing)	
Chief Powhatan	Pocahontas; Pocahontas II: Journey to a New World	The father of Pocahontas and the leader of the Powhatan tribe. Based on the real-life Powhatan.	Russell Means (speaking); Jim Cummings (singing)	
Uttamatomakkin "Uti"	Pocahontas II: Journey to a New World	Pocahontas's bodyguard. Based upon the real-life Uttamatomakkin (Tomocomo).	Brad Garrett (briefly)	
Medicine Woman	The Simpsons Movie	She is the mysterious Inuk shaman who saves Homer Simpson from a polar bear. She also appears in the Season 21 episode "Boy Meets Curl".	Tress MacNeille	
Little Creek	Spirit: Stallion of the Cimarron	A Lakota young man who is rescued by the titular mustang horse from the cavalry. His pet is a female American Paint Horse named Rain.	Daniel Studi	
Injurin' Joe	Tom Sawyer	An American black bear and the antagonist of the direct-to-video film based on the novel The Adventures of Tom Sawyer by Mark Twain.	Hank Williams Jr. Kevin Michael Richardson	
Chief Rain-In-The-P-P-Puss	Tom Tom Tomcat	The leader of the Native American bicolor cats. The 1953 short film starring Tweety and Sylvester the Cat.	Mel Blanc	
Andar	Turok: Son of Stone	2008 animated film based on the comic books of the same name by Western Publishing and Dell Comics.	Adam Gifford	
Catori	Turok: Son of Stone	She is the mother of Ander and the sister-of-law of Turok.	Irene Bedard (adult); Iyari Limon (teenager)	
Chichak	Turok: Son of Stone	The main antagonist of the film.	Robert Knepper	
Nashoba	Turok: Son of Stone	He is the brother Turok, the father of Ander and the husband of Catori.	Gil Birmingham (adult); Matthew Yang King (teenager)	
Turok	Turok: Son of Stone	The main protagonist of the film.	Adam Beach (adult); Rick Mora (teenager)	
Injun Joe	Wagon Heels	The Native American "Super Chief" whose name is a play on the Santa Fe train run of the same name and shares the same name with the main antagonist from The Adventures of Tom Sawyer. The 1945 Merrie Melodies short film starring Porky Pig.	Mel Blanc	
Says Nothing	Who Framed Roger Rabbit	A Native American toon bullet who has been used for Eddie Valiant's (Bob Hoskins) revolver gun. 1988 animated/live-action hybrid film based on the 1981 novel Who Censored Roger Rabbit? by Gary K. Wolf.	N/A	

== Television ==
=== Live action series ===
Native American	Series title	Notes	Actor(s)	Ref(s)
Rosalind "Roz" Friendly	Alaska Daily	A Native Alaskan and star reporter for the Daily Alaskan in Anchorage, whose cousin Laura was a victim of an unsolved crime, leading her to report on the missing and murdered Indigenous women crisis in the state of Alaska.	Grace Dove	
Ka'kwet	Anne with an E	The Mi'kmaq girl who befriends Anne Shirley (Amybeth McNulty) in the third season of the series based on the children's novel Anne of Green Gables by Lucy Maud Montgomery.	Kiawentiio	
Alexander "Alex" Longshadow	Banshee	He is the tribal chief and the rival of Kai Proctor (Ulrich Thomsen).	Anthony Ruivivar	
Deputy Bill Raven	Banshee	He was formerly the officer of the fictional Kinaho Reservastion Police Department who becomes a deputy of Banshee.	Chaske Spencer	
Running Dog	Black Fox	Three-part miniseries that aired on CBS, based on the novel of the same name by Matt Braun.	Raoul Trujillo	
Black Thunder	By Way of the Stars	1992 miniseries based on the German children's novel The Long Journey of Lukas B. by Willi Fährmann.	Eric Schweig	
Cree Chief	By Way of the Stars	The unnamed chief of the Cree tribe.	Gordon Tootoosis	
Matthew Tommy	Cashing In	The owner of an indigenous-owned casino in the fictional First Nations community of Stonewalker.	Eric Schweig	
Blue Leaf	Centennial	1978 miniseries with 12 episodes that aired on NBC. Based on the novel of the same name by James A. Michener.	Maria Potts; Monika Ramirez (teenager); Maria Yolanda Aguayo (child)	
Clay Basket	Centennial	The beautiful daughter of Lame Beaver and the wife of Pasquinel; the mother of Jacques and Marcel Pasquinel and Lucinda McKeag.	Barbara Carrera	
Lame Beaver	Centennial	The Arapaho man and the main character of the miniseries.	Michael Ansara; David Yanez (child)	
Chief Lost Eagle	Centennial	The tribal chief of the Arapaho.	Nick Ramus	
Chief Walks-The-Clouds	Children of the Dust	The 1995 miniseries based on the novel of the same name by Clancy Carlile.	Byron Chief-Moon	
White Wolf/Corby White	Children of the Dust	A young man who was raised by whites.	Billy Wirth	
Mingo	Daniel Boone	An Oxford-educated half-British Native American and the companion of Daniel Boone (Fess Parker).	Ed Ames	
Black Wing	Death Valley Days	The chief of the Ute tribe, in the episode "A Key for the Fort".	George Keymas	
Grace Cardinal	Degrassi: The Next Generation and Degrassi: Next Class	Appeared in 75 episodes.	Na'ku'set Gould	
Chief Black Kettle	Dr. Quinn, Medicine Woman	Based on the real-life Black Kettle.	Nick Ramus	
Byron Sully	Dr. Quinn, Medicine Woman	A Cheyenne man and the main character of the series.	Joe Lando	
Cloud Dancing	Dr. Quinn, Medicine Woman		Larry Sellers	
Crazy Cat	F Troop	The heir apparent of the fictional Hekawi tribe.	Don Diamond	
Chief Wild Eagle	F Troop	The leader of the Hekawi tribe.	Frank de Kova	
Ohanzee "Hanzee" Dent	Fargo	The mysterious Native American tracker and hitman for the Gerhardt crime family in Season 2.	Mark Acheson (Season 1); Zahn McClarnon (Season 2)	
Swanee Capps	Fargo	A bank robber and fugitive along with her lover Zelmare Roulette in Season 4.	Kelsey Asbille	
Declan Harp	Frontier	He is a half-Cree and half-Irish outlaw who campaigns to breach the Hudson's Bay Company's monopoly on the North American fur trade in Canada. He is also the brother-in-law of Sokanon (Jessica Matten) when he marries her sister Nuna.	Jason Momoa	
Kamenna	Frontier	She is an elder chief of the fictional Cree tribe of Lake Walkers, whose grandson Kitchi (Kiowa Gordon) has been kidnapped and killed by the alcoholic Cedric Brown (Stephen Lord).	Tantoo Cardinal	
Sasappis	Ghosts	The ghost of a cynical Lenape Native American.	Román Zaragoza	
Chief Redwood	H.R. Pufnstuf	An anthropomorphic tree that dons a feathered headdress and speaks in a fashion of stereotypical melodramatic Native American.	Walker Edmiston (voice)	
John Hawk	Hawk	He is an Iroquois special detective working for New York City's district attorney office.	Burt Reynolds	
Joseph Black Moon	Hell on Wheels	A Cheyenne Christian convert preacher.	Eddie Spears	
Chief Many Horses	Hell on Wheels	Father of Joseph Black Moon and Cheyenne chieftain.	Wes Studi	
Pawnee Killer	Hell on Wheels	Son of Chief Many Horses and brother to Joseph Black Moon.	Gerald Auger	
Danny Lightfoot	Hey Dude	A Hopi Native American and one of the main characters of the series.	Joe Torres	
Satangkai	How the West Was Won	The chief of the Sioux Nation.	Ricardo Montalbán (guest)	
Chief Featherman	Howdy Doody	A marionette.		
Princess SummerFallWinterSpring	Howdy Doody	She is a member of the fictional Tinka Tonka tribe.	marionette Judy Tyler; Linda Marsh (briefly)	
Chief Thunderthud	Howdy Doody	The head of the fictional Ooragnak (Kangaroo" spelled backwards) tribe.	Bill Le Cornec marionette	
Dr. Gabrielle Whitecloud	The Incredible Hulk	She helps Dr. David Banner (Bill Bixby) research a possible Hulk from the distant past. Season 2, Episode 19: Kindred Spirits	Kim Cattrall (guest)	
Lone Wolf	The Incredible Hulk	Elder of Native American tribe. Season 2, Episode 19: Kindred Spirits	Chief Dan George (guest)	
Rick	The Incredible Hulk	Native American who tries to stop Dr. Banner and Dr. Whitecloud from taking ruins. Season 2, Episode 19: Kindred Spirits	A Martinez (guest)	
Thomas Logan	The Incredible Hulk	Dr. David Banner contacts Logan who created an herbal medicine with a calming effect in an attempt to control the Hulk transformation. Season 2, Episode 4: Rainbow's End	Ned Romero (guest)	
Dog Star	Into the West	The older brother of Loved-by-the-Buffalo and Thunder Heart Woman.	Pony Boy Osuniga; Michael Spears; Gil Birmingham	
Growling Bear	Into the West	The elder Lakota medicine man.	Gordon Tootoosis	
Loved-by-the-Buffalo/White Feather	Into the West	One of the main characters of the miniseries.	Chevez Ezaneh; Simon R. Baker; George Leach; Steve Reevis; Joseph M. Marshall III	
Margaret Light Shines Wheeler	Into the West	The Native wife of the British photographer, Ethan Biggs (Daniel Gillies), and the daughter of the wheelwright, Jacob Wheeler (Matthew Settle), and Thunder Heart Woman.	Chantry Bruised Head; Summer Rae Birdyellowhead; Sage Galesi; Irene Bedard	
Prairie Fire	Into the West	A Cheyenne chief.	Jay Tavare	
Running Fox	Into the West	The older brother of Loved-by-the-Buffalo and Thunder Heart Woman.	Mathew Strongeagle; Zahn McClarnon; Russell Means	
Red Lance	Into the West	Running Fox's grandson.	Malachi Tsoodle-Nelson; Eddie Spears	
Sleeping Bear	Into the West	The surviving son of Dog Star and nephew of Loved-by-the-Buffalo, Thunder Heart Woman and Running Fox.	Nathan Lee Chasing His Horse	
Thunder Heart Woman	Into the West	The sister of Loved-by-the-Buffalo, Running Fox and Dog Star; the wife of the trapper, Thomas Lebeck (Scott Heindl), and Jacob Wheeler (John Terry).	Sarah Weston; Tonantzin Carmelo; Sheila Tousey	
Voices That Carry	Into the West	Red Lance's younger brother and the second grandson of Running Fox.	Nakotah LaRance; Chaske Spencer	
Necani	It: Welcome to Derry	Appears in a flashback, she's a young girl from the fictional Sqoteawapskot tribe, she is part of a small group of children who attempt to fight The Gallu (Pennywise). She and her friends gather shards of the meteorite to create a mystic cage in which they will stop It in the Western Wood, an area in which the settlers will later found Derry. Essentially she's the leader of an early version of the "Losers' Club".	Kiawentiio	
Rose	It: Welcome to Derry	She's an elder of the Sqoteawapskot tribe, she owns a second-hand shop and has a history with the General Francis Shaw, saving him from It when they were children. She is the keeper of memories and protector of the knowledge of the Sqoteawapskot tribe.	Kimberly Norris Guerrero	
Sesqui	It: Welcome to Derry	Sesqui, the great chief warrior, was the leader of the Sqoteawapskot tribe when her daughter Necani and two other girls ventured in to the cave to recover fragments of the star, since the fragment they carved as a weapon to protect the tribe from the monster was not enough since the arrival of the colonists, who had made it strong by being easy prey.	Morningstar Angeline	
Taniel	It: Welcome to Derry	Rose's nephew and member of the secret society The Children of Maturin, a group of young Native Americans tasked with guard the knowledge around the cage, watching "the Pillars" that keep The Gallu locked up in Derry. It is through him that Dick Hallorann learns the story of how the creature came to Earth.	Joshua Odjick	
Chacrow	Jamestown	He is the Native American go-between the settlers and the Pamunkey tribespeople.	Kalani Queypo	
Opchanacanough	Jamestown	The chief, or king, of the Pamunkey Tribe. Based on the real-life Opchanacanough.	Raoul Trujillo	
Winganuske	Jamestown	Chacrow's sister who is married to Henry Sharrow (Max Beesley) as a gift.	Rachel Colwell	
Chester Lake	Law & Order: Special Victims Unit	He is the first Native American detective on the Law & Order series.	Adam Beach	
Kerry Loudermilk	Legion	A Native American mutant who shares a body with her white brother, Cary.	Amber Midthunder	
Big Chief Sitting Duck	Lidsville	An anthropomorphic feathered hat resembling the Indian chief's headdress. His body is covered by a thick Indian blanket.	Walker Edmiston (voice)	
Nakoma	The Life and Times of Grizzly Adams	Native American friend of Adams (Dan Haggerty) and Mad Jack (Denver Pyle).	Don Shanks (series regular)	
Chief Jack Lame Horse	Little House on the Prairie	A Native American who saves Charles Ingalls (Michael Landon) from freezing to death. Season 1, Episode 22: Survival Based on the children's novel series of the same name by Laura Ingalls Wilder.	Robert Tessier (guest)	
Tonto	The Lone Ranger	He is the Native American companion of the Lone Ranger (Clayton Moore) himself.	Jay Silverheels	
Blue Duck	Lonesome Dove miniseries	Lonesome Dove; Comanche Moon; Based on the novel series of the same name by Larry McMurtry.	Frederic Forrest (1989); Adam Beach (2008)	
Chief Buffalo Hump	Lonesome Dove miniseries	Dead Man's Walk; Comanche Moon	Eric Schweig (1996); Wes Studi (2008)	
Famous Shoes	Lonesome Dove miniseries	The Kickapoo tracker.: Streets of Laredo; Comanche Moon	Wes Studi (1995); David Midthunder (2008)	
Kicking Wolf	Lonesome Dove miniseries	Dead Man's Walk; Comanche Moon	Jonathan Joss	
Hector	Longmire	A Cheyenne ex-boxer. Based on the Walt Longmire mystery novels by Craig Johnson.	Jeffrey De Serrano	
Henry Standing Bear	Longmire	The main character of the series.	Lou Diamond Phillips	
Jacob Nighthorse	Longmire	A local Cheyenne businessman and the antagonist of the series.	A Martinez	
Mandy	Longmire	A young Cheyenne woman who is hired to assist in the legal-aid office on the Cheyenne reservation.	Tamara Duarte	
Chief Mathias	Longmire	The head of the Cheyenne reservation's tribal police.	Zahn McClarnon	
May Still Water	Longmire	A Cheyenne woman.	Irene Bedard	
Sam Poteet	Longmire	A Cheyenne White warrior and sage.	Hank Cheyne	
Aaya	Neverland	The daughter of the Kaw Chief. The 2011 Syfy/Sky Movies miniseries that serves as a prequel story of J. M. Barrie's Peter Pan.	Q'orianka Kilcher	
Kaw Chief	Neverland	The leader of the Kaw tribe.	George Aguilar	
Injun Joe	The New Adventures of Huckleberry Finn	Injun Joe appeared in the pilot of this series based on Mark Twain's classic novel, where he chases Huck Finn (Michael Shea), Tom Sawyer (Kevin Schultz) and Becky Thatcher (LuAnn Haslam) into McDougal's Cave. In an attempt to outrun Injun Joe, the three youngsters whisk away into the world of animation where they interact with each of the different cartoon characters.	Ted Cassidy	
Dave the Cook	Northern Exposure	He is the cheerful Native American cook of the Brick who has been replaced by Eugene as a new cook.	William J. White	
Ed Chigliak	Northern Exposure	A mild-mannered half-Native Alaskan who was raised by the Tlingits when he was a foundling child.	Darren E. Burrows	
Leonard Quinhagak	Northern Exposure	The cousin of Marilyn Whirlwind and the mentor of Ed Chigliak; a Native medicine man.	Graham Greene	
Lester Haines	Northern Exposure	As a Haida, Lester is the first native to crack top five wealthiest men in the interior; he is also the fourth wealthiest.	Apesanahkwat	
Marilyn Whirlwind	Northern Exposure	The Native Alaskan receptionist of the series' central character, Dr. Joel Fleischman (Rob Morrow).	Elaine Miles	
One-Who-Waits	Northern Exposure	The ghost of a long-dead chief from the Native American Bear clan and the spirit guide of Ed Chigliak.	Floyd Westerman	
Bun	North of North	Saija and Ting's young daughter.	Kiera Belle Cooper	
Colin	North of North	A Māori man who traveled to the Arctic for love. He now runs the local radio station.	Bailey Poching	
Elisapee	North of North	The community center receptionist. She's a residential school survivor who conflates hardcore Christianity with traditional Inuit culture.	Nutaaq Doreen Simmonds	
Kuuk	North of North	An Inuk and Cree city boy who takes a job as a research assistant to go up North.	Braeden Clarke	
Millie	North of North	Millie is Saija's best friend and also works at the community center.	Zorga Qaunaq	
Neevee	North of North	Siaja's mother who raised her on her own. She is a recovering alcoholic with a harsh personality and a biting sense of humour who isn't afraid to tell it like it is. She runs a local general store.	Maika Harper	
Saija	North of North	Saija is the main character of the show. She is a young Inuk mother who wants to break out of the rut she has found herself in. She is on a journey to change her life, which starts with getting a job at the community center. She jumps in with both feet into everything she does, and it often gets her into trouble. But she has a big heart and big aspirations for herself, her family, and her community.	Anna Lambe	
Ting	North of North	Ting is a pilot and proficient hunter. He is beloved by the community, and seen as a golden boy. The truth is he is a narcissist who only cares about his image, being in the spotlight and his daughter.	Kelly William	
Tiger Lily	Once Upon a Time	Debuted in Season 6, Tiger Lily is originally a fairy who has to remove her status and relocate in Neverland after being tricked by the Black Fairy (aka Fiona) into banishing all children to the Land Without Magic.	Sara Tomko	
Chief Black Cloud	Paradise	The tribal chief in the episode "The Burial Ground".	Nick Ramus	
John Taylor	Paradise	The Native American medicine man and a close friend of Ethan Allen Cord (Lee Horsley).	Dehl Berti	
Chief Ken Hotate	Parks and Recreation	The leader of the local Wamapoke tribe in the fictional town of Pawnee, Indiana, who appears in the Season 3 episode "Harvest Festival".	Jonathan Joss	
Dr. Thomas "Tommy" Oliver	Power Rangers	Born as Thomas Marshall, he has been adopted by the Oliver family and is a transfer student at the fictional Angel Grove High School, where he has been brainwashed by the evil witch Rita Repulsa (Machiko Soga) to become the Green Ranger in the Mighty Morphin Power Rangers five-part miniseries, "Green with Evil". In Power Rangers Zeo, Tommy becomes the Red Zeo Ranger and meets up with his long-lost brother David Trueheart (Erik Frank). In Power Rangers Dino Thunder, he is hired to be a teacher at Reefside High School where he becomes the Black Dino Ranger.	Jason David Frank	
Skye Nakaiye	The Puzzle Place	He is a White Mountain Apache boy from Indian reservation in Arizona and one of the main characters of the show.	Peter Linz (Seasons 1–2); Matt Vogel (Season 3)	
Phillip Kopus	The Red Road	A dangerous Ramapough Lenape Indian whose tribe resides in the Ramapo Mountains in the fictional small town of Walpole, New Jersey.	Jason Momoa	
Elora Danan Postoak	Reservation Dogs	The four Native teenagers in rural Oklahoma who spend their days committing crimes and fighting it. Elora Danan is named for the Willow character.	Devery Jacobs	
Bear Smallhill	Reservation Dogs	The four Native teenagers in rural Oklahoma who spend their days committing crimes and fighting it. Elora Danan is named for the Willow character.	D'Pharaoh Woon-A-Tai	
Chester "Cheese" Williams	Reservation Dogs	The four Native teenagers in rural Oklahoma who spend their days committing crimes and fighting it. Elora Danan is named for the Willow character.	Lane Factor	
Wilhelmina "Willie Jack" Jacqueline Sampson	Reservation Dogs	The four Native teenagers in rural Oklahoma who spend their days committing crimes and fighting it. Elora Danan is named for the Willow character.	Paulina Alexis	
Asta Twelvetrees	Resident Alien	She is an Ute assistant to the town doctor at the Patience health clinic. Based on the comic books of the same name.	Sara Tomko	
Deputy Marshal Sam Buckhart	The Rifleman; Law of the Plainsman	Sam Buckhart appears in two episodes (The Indian" and "The Raid) of The Rifleman and is a main character of its spin-off Law of the Plainsman.	Michael Ansara	
Reagan Wells	Rutherford Falls	She is a member of the fictional Minishonka Nation who juggles loyalty to both her lifelong friend Nathan Rutherford (Ed Helms) and her people.	Jana Schmieding	
Terry Thomas	Rutherford Falls	He is the CEO of the Minishonka's casino who envisions big things for both Reagan and the success of their tribe. He is also the father of Maya Thomas (Kiawentiio).	Michael Greyeyes	
William "Billy" Twofeathers	Shining Time Station	He is the Native American railroad engineer on the fictitious Indian Valley Railroad. Billy also appeared in the film Thomas and the Magic Railroad, portrayed by Russell Means.	Tom Jackson	
Charges the Enemy	The Son		Tatanka Means	
Prairie Flower	The Son		Elizabeth Frances	
Toshaway	The Son	The Comanche tribal chief.	Zahn McClarnon	
Anthwara	Star Trek	Leader of Native American colony on Cardassian owned planet of Dorvan V. Season 7, Episode 20: Journey's End	Ned Romero (Guest)	
Commander Chakotay	Star Trek	First Officer aboard the starship USS Voyager. He was formerly a member of the Maquis resistance.	Robert Beltran	
Goro	Star Trek	He is the elder chief of the indigenous tribe (modeled on Native Americans) on the fictional planet Amerind, half a galaxy away from Earth, in the episode "The Paradise Syndrome".	Richard Hale	
Lakanta	Star Trek	Native American colonist on Cardassian owned planet Dorvan V. He later revealed to be The Traveler (Eric Menyuk). Season 7, Episode 20: Journey's End	Tom Jackson (guest)	
Miramanee	Star Trek	She is the tribal priestess of the planet Amerind and the daughter of Goro. In the episode "The Paradise Syndrome", Miramanee was under influence of the belief that Captain James T. Kirk (William Shatner), who had a suffered amnesia, was a god by the name of "Kirok" whom her tribespeople hailed as. She was also married to Kirk, who said that he would stay at the tribe with her until her death.	Sabrina Scharf	
Salish	Star Trek	He is the medicine chief among the tribe of his people, in the episode "The Paradise Syndrome". After Captain Kirk (aka Kirok) used mouth-to-mouth resuscitation to revive the tribal child and has been accepted by the elders as their god, Salish lost his position as a medicine chief. He even lost Miramanee, whom he was bound to marry, as she rejected him for Kirk.	Rudy Solari	
Elizabeth	Tipi Tales	The four Ojibway cousins who learn various wisdoms of life during their visit to their great-grandfather's woodland cottage.	Rebecca Gibson (voice)	
Eugene "Junior"	Tipi Tales	The four Ojibway cousins who learn various wisdoms of life during their visit to their great-grandfather's woodland cottage.	Ryan Rajendra Black (voice)	
Russell	Tipi Tales	The four Ojibway cousins who learn various wisdoms of life during their visit to their great-grandfather's woodland cottage.	Herbie Barnes (voice)	
Samantha "Sam"	Tipi Tales	The four Ojibway cousins who learn various wisdoms of life during their visit to their great-grandfather's woodland cottage.	Jan Skene (voice)	
Samantha "Sam" Woodburn	Tribal	The newly appointed chief of the indigenous police force in the Nêhiyawak First Nation in Alberta.	Jessica Matten	
Cherokee Lawshe	True Women	She is half Creek. The CBS miniseries based on the novel by Janice Woods Windle.	Julie Carmen	
Tarantula	True Women	The Comanche warrior.	Michael Greyeyes	
Deputy Tommy "Hawk" Hill	Twin Peaks	The Native American who works at the Twin Peaks sheriff's department under Sheriff Harry S. Truman (Michael Ontkean).	Michael Horse	
Jackie "Jacqueline" White	Unbreakable Kimmy Schmidt	She is an insecure socialite who is formerly Lakota but passes as white, hating her Native American heritage, as she purchases contact lenses to make her eyes blue and dyes her hair blonde.	Jane Krakowski	
Raymond Firewalker	Walker, Texas Ranger	The paternal uncle of Cordell Walker (Chuck Norris) whom he raised after his parents were killed.	Floyd Westerman (season 1); Apesanahkwat (season 2)	
Jack Lone Feather	The West Wing	Jack and Maggie are the Native Americans who encamp in the West Wing lobby where they make a deal with C. J. Cregg (Allison Janney). They appear in the Season 3 Thanksgiving episode "The Indians in the Lobby".	Gary Farmer	
Maggie Morningstar-Charles	The West Wing	Jack and Maggie are the Native Americans who encamp in the West Wing lobby where they make a deal with C. J. Cregg (Allison Janney). They appear in the Season 3 Thanksgiving episode "The Indians in the Lobby".	Georgina Lightning	
Akecheta	Westworld	The host and elder of the Ghost Nation and a recurring character of the series based on the 1973 film of the same name.	Zahn McClarnon	
Etu	Westworld	One of the members of the Ghost Nation.	Booboo Stewart	
Kohana	Westworld	The wife of Akecheta.	Julia Jones	
Wichapi	Westworld	One of the members of the Ghost Nation.	Irene Bedard	
Pahoo-Ka-Ta-Wah	Yancy Derringer	He is the silent shotgun-toting Pawnee Indian who communicates only by sign language; the sidekick of Yancy Derringer (Jock Mahoney).	X Brands	
Chief Thomas Rainwater	Yellowstone	He is the tribal chairman of the fictional Broken Rock Indian Reservation who along with his bodyguard Mo (Moses Brings Plenty) seeks to reclaim the Yellowstone ranch from the Dutton family for which he considers it was stolen from the Indians who originally lived in it.	Gil Birmingham	
Buck Cross/Running Buck	The Young Riders	The half-Kiowa who is a close friend of Ike McSwain (Travis Fine).	Gregg Rainwater	

=== Animated series ===
Native American	Series title	Notes	Voice actor(s)	Ref(s)
Annie Redfeather	Adventures from the Book of Virtues	She is a 10-year-old girl of Native American descent. Based on the anthology story The Book of Virtues by William Bennett.	Kath Soucie (seasons 1–2); Adrienne Carter (season 3); Denise Tan (overdub)	
Pow Wow	Adventures of Pow Wow	The pre-adolescent Native American boy who discovers animals, hurt or otherwise, and attempts to protect the forest and wildlife from various threats. The animated series that was broadcast on the children's show Captain Kangaroo.	N/A	
Injun Joe	The Adventures of Tom Sawyer	A Japanese anime television series based on Mark Twain's famous novel of the same name.	Eiji Kanie, Kenji Utsumi (Japanese); Tom Wyner (English)	
Apache Chief	The All-New Super Friends Hour	A Native American superhero who Manitou Raven is his variant.	Regis Cordic (debut); Michael Rye; Al Fann (one episode)	
Rusty Smith	American Dad!	He is the Native American half-brother of Stan Smith, brother-in-law of Francine Smith and paternal uncle of Hayley and Steve Smith, who lives in Arizona with his wife Sooleawa'Uha and seldom-speaking son Glen.	Lou Diamond Phillips	
Kai Green	Ben 10	She is a Navajo girl who is one of the first love interests of Ben Tennyson.	Bettina Bush	
Wes Green	Ben 10	The grandfather of Kai Green and a retired Plumber operative.	Miguel Nájera	
Bizou	Bizou	An Aboriginal Canadian princess and central character who explores the world of animals.	Paula Davis	
Marshal BraveStarr	BraveStarr	He is the galactic Native American marshal of New Texas and the main character of the series. He also appeared in an animated film, BraveStarr: The Movie.	Pat Fraley	
Thrasher	Captain Flamingo	He is an Inuk kid who calls Captain Flamingo for help finding his missing electric guitar in "Flamingopalooza".	Noam Zylberman	
Charles Little Bull	The Casagrandes	Charles is a college student of Lakota heritage who begins to tutor Carlota Casagrande at the fictional Great Lakes City Library in the Season 2 episode "Undivided Attention". He is considered the first Lakota character to appear in a major animated program.	Robbie Daymond	
Laughing Bull	Cowboy Bebop	He is an old shaman of Native American descent who lives on Mars.	Takehiro Koyama (Japanese); Michael Gregory (English)	
Upa	Dragon Ball	Also known in English dub as Littlefoot or Little Feather, he is the son of the warrior-chief Bora, whose Native American-based Karinga Tribe serves as the guardians of the Korin Tower in the Sacred Land of Korin. Upa has been a friend to Goku, with whom he had fought the Red Ribbon Army. He and Bora also appeared in the anime film, Dragon Ball: Mystical Adventure.	Mitsuko Horie (child); Masaaki Ōkura (teen); Takeshi Kusao (adult)	
Leonard Cornfeathers	Family Guy	Appearing in the Season 1 episode "The Son Also Draws", Leonard is the boss of the Native American casino called Geronimo's Palace, where he makes up the vision quest when Peter Griffin pretends to be a Native American himself just to get his car back. There are also the American Indian elders who serve as the employees in Geronimo's Palace, including: Sees-You-Coming; Deals-With-His-Wrist; Change-For-a-Buck, voiced by Bill Fagerbakke; Watches-You-Pee	Bobby Slayton	
Great Big Little Panther	Fox's Peter Pan & the Pirates	An animated television series that aired on Fox, based on the Peter Pan story by J. M. Barrie.	Michael Wise	
Hard-to-Hit	Fox's Peter Pan & the Pirates	The younger brother of Tiger Lily and the son of Great Big Little Panther; the prince of the Native American tribe.	Aaron Lohr	
Tiger Lily	Fox's Peter Pan & the Pirates		Cree Summer	
Broken Feather	The Funny Company		Tom Thomas	
Super Chief	The Funny Company	Named after the crack passenger train in the Santa Fe Railroad.	N/A	
Spirit	G.I. Joe	Spirit, the native from the Taos Pueblo Reservation in Taos, New Mexico, appears in the following animated series: G.I. Joe: A Real American Hero (1985); G.I. Joe: A Real American Hero (1989); G.I. Joe: Sigma 6 (2005)	Gregg Berger (1985); Maurice LaMarche (1989); Marc Thompson (2005)	
Coyote	Gargoyles	A Native American trickster spirit. Based on the mythology of the same name.	Gregg Rainwater	
Elisa Maza	Gargoyles	Elisa, the NYPD detective, is half Native American on her father's side.	Salli Richardson	
Natsilane (Nick)	Gargoyles	A Native American young man of the Pacific Northwest. Inspired by the Haida and Tlingit mythological hero of the same name.	Gregg Rainwater	
Peter Maza	Gargoyles	A Native American who was formerly an NYPD officer and is the father of Elisa Maza.	Michael Horse	
Ruffled Feathers	Go Go Gophers	The last two surviving Native American gophers who often foil the plans of Colonel Kit Coyote and Sgt. Okey Homa, the leaders of the coyote U.S. Army fort, to secure the town of Gopher Gulch by wiping them out.	Sandy Becker	
Chief Running Board	Go Go Gophers	The last two surviving Native American gophers who often foil the plans of Colonel Kit Coyote and Sgt. Okey Homa, the leaders of the coyote U.S. Army fort, to secure the town of Gopher Gulch by wiping them out.	George S. Irving	
Chief Jirukoma	How a Realist Hero Rebuilt the Kingdom	Jirukoma and his sister Komain are the tribal leaders of the refugee camp who Kazuya Souma, king of Friedonia, offers them to move into the city of Venetinova and help finish its construction in the Part Two episode "Away from My Hometown for So Many Years". The refugees in this show look reminiscent of the Native American heritage.	Kenta Miyake (Japanese); Ray Hurd (English)	
Komain	How a Realist Hero Rebuilt the Kingdom	Jirukoma and his sister Komain are the tribal leaders of the refugee camp who Kazuya Souma, king of Friedonia, offers them to move into the city of Venetinova and help finish its construction in the Part Two episode "Away from My Hometown for So Many Years". The refugees in this show look reminiscent of the Native American heritage.	Yuuki Hirose (Japanese); Jalitza Delago (English)	
Chief Crazy Coyote	The Huckleberry Hound Show	The regular Indian nemesis of Huckleberry Hound.	Don Messick	
Jesse Cosay	Infinity Train	An Apache teen from Arizona.	Robbie Daymond	
White Feather	Jonny Quest	He is a Native American living in the woods of Quebec, Canada who has the ability to talk to animals, including his pet wolf Grey One, and move around unnoticed in the episode, "Werewolf of the Timberland".	Mike Road	
Sheriff Ohiyesa Smith	Justice League Unlimited	He appeared in a time-travel episode "The Once and Future Thing" as a sheriff of Elkhorn in the 1880s.	Jonathan Joss	
Matthew Carver (Kagagi)	Kagagi	A teenage Native Canadian who transforms into his titular Raven-type superhero alter-ego.	Eric Wilson	
John Redcorn III	King of the Hill	The Native American former "healer" and adulterous lover of Nancy Gribble.	Victor Aaron (season 1); Jonathan Joss (seasons 2–13)	
Joseph John Gribble	King of the Hill	The biological son of John Redcorn who has been raised by the Gribble family, despite his obvious Native American features.	Brittany Murphy (1997–2000); Breckin Meyer (2000–2009)	
Geronimo	Kinnikuman	Geronimo is a human Cherokee warrior who becomes the Justice Choujin in his teenage years. He is the adoptive son of Chief Cheyenne and the older brother of Amy.	Kaneto Shiozawa	
BW	Long Gone Gulch	A 21-year-old sardonic bounty hunter and Native American human who hangs around the saloon. She likes to mess with Rawhide and Snag. According to series creator Zach Bellissimo, the "BW" in her name does not mean anything.	Amber Midthunder	
Nehtan Kon	Molly of Denali	Also often referred to as "Grandpa Nat", he is Molly Mabray's maternal grandfather and Layla's father.	Lorne Cardinal	
Shahnyaa "Molly" Mabray	Molly of Denali	A 10-year-old Alaska Native vlogger of the fictional Qyah village whose parents Walter and Layla Mabray own and run the Denali Trading Post. She is the first Alaska Native protagonist to ever appear in children's animated television program that aired on PBS Kids.	Sovereign Bill	
Tooey Ookami	Molly of Denali	A young boy who is half Alaska Native and half Japanese and one of Molly's best friends.	Sequoia Janvier (season 1); Zane Jasper (season 2)	
Keruyan	Monarch: The Big Bear of Tallac	An Indian man who left his tribe to raise his son Ron like the "white people" in the Sierra Nevada. Based on the novel of the same name by Ernest Thompson Seton.	Jun Hazumi	
Ron	Monarch: The Big Bear of Tallac	A young Indian boy who raised the two bear cub siblings, Jackie and Gill, after their mother was shot and killed accidentally by Keruyan.	Yoshiko Matsuo	
Chief Thunderhooves	My Little Pony: Friendship Is Magic	He is the chieftain of the native buffalo tribe who along with Little Strongheart and the rest of the buffalo puts the frontier ponies in the nearby town of Appleoosa into conflict for planting an apple grove at their running ground, until Twilight Sparkle and her pony friends establish peace between the two groups, in the Season 1 episode "Over a Barrel".	Scott McNeil	
Brave Paw	Paw Paw Bears	He is Princess Paw Paws' closest friend and possible lover who is most courageous and strong-willed of the Paw Paws. His companion is a magical flying horse, Golden Thunder.	Thom Pinto	
Laughing Paw	Paw Paw Bears		Alexandra Stoddart	
Meanos	Paw Paw Bears	The Meanos are a group of villainous Indians who are after the Paw Paws' three large wooden totems, Eagle, Bear, and Tortoise.: Dark Paw, the sorcerer chief of the Meanos; Slippery Paw; Bumble Paw	Stanley Ralph Ross; Frank Welker	
Mighty Paw	Paw Paw Bears	The strongest and biggest of the Paw Paws.	Robert Ridgely	
Princess Paw Paws	Paw Paw Bears	She is the daughter of Wise Paw, who carries the Mystic Moonstone worn around her neck which has the power to bring Totem Eagle, Bear and Tortoise to life. Her companion is a flying horse, Flying Cloud.	Susan Blu	
Trembly Paw	Paw Paw Bears	The coward of the Paw Paws.	Howard Morris	
Wise Paw	Paw Paw Bears	The aging chief of the Paw Paws, the oldest and wisest of the tribe, who serves as tribal advisor.	John Ingle	
Principal Cutler	The Replacements	The Inuk principal of the fictional George Stapler Middle School.	Jeff Bennett	
Grey Fox	The Scooby-Doo Show	He is a greedy, ruthless Chippewa mastermind who operates an owl-like monster called the Willawaw in the Season 3 episode "Watch Out! The Willawaw!" He and his henchmen dressed as the Owl Men attempt to scare away the people, including the Mystery Inc. gang, from his smuggling operation into Canada.	Lennie Weinrib	
Red Herron	The Scooby-Doo Show	He is the Chippewa chief who in the episode "Watch Out! The Willawaw!" suspects about the Willawaw legend. He also has to rescue his friend and Velma Dinkley's uncle, Dave Walton, who has been kidnapped by Grey Fox and the Owl Men after discovering their crimewave. His name is a play on red herring.	John Stephenson	
Indian Witch Doctor	Scooby-Doo, Where Are You!	Appearing in the Season 1 episode "Decoy for a Dognapper", the Indian Witch Doctor was one of the monstrous villains in the series who planned to kidnap all of the dogs, including Scooby-Doo. It is later revealed that he is actually dog trainer Buck Masters in disguise.	Don Messick	
Dr. Paul Williams	Sealab 2020	He is the Chinook oceanographer and the leader of the Sealab research team.	Ross Martin	
Patch Tribe	Shaman King	The Patch Tribe are a group of Native American shamans whose purpose, while overseeing the Shaman Fight tournaments, is to guard the selected Shaman King during their purification and gradual merge with the Great Spirits, in both the original 2001 anime series and its 2021 reboot. The members of the Patch Tribe include: Chieftess Goldva, the elder leader and organizer of the Shaman Fight who is mistaken for a man due to her androgynous appearance and deeper voice. Her guardian spirit is a totem bird called "Big Chief", the first chief of the Patch Tribe.; Silva, the member of the Shaman Fight Selection Committee who oversees the Glacier Plant. He travels from the U.S. to Japan to test Yoh Asakura's worth to be in the Shaman Fight, hinting him on the means to manifest his Over Soul. His spirit allies are the Silver Arms.; Kalim, one of Silva's best friends who oversees the Highland Plant and Horohoro's test in the Shaman Fight along with Team Icemen. His guardian spirit is a black bull named "Black Sickle".; Nichrom, the young priest of the Patch Tribe and overseer of the Cave Plant who inherits his position after his older brother Chrom was killed by the hands of Tao Ren. His guardian spirits are a scorpion called "Yellow Whip" and a locust called "Purple Kick", Chrom's spirit.; Magna, the officiant of the Patch Tribe and overseer of the Volcano Plant who takes Nichrom under his wing when Nichrom himself becomes an official. His guardian spirit is a great horned owl named "Magnescope".; Radim, the overseer of the Lake Plant and official who is selected as a moderator of the tournament. His guardian spirit is an Australian pelican called "Platinum Sword".; Namari, the overseer of the Desert Plant and officiant in charge of the three Gandhara teams. His guardian spirit is a cobra named "Red Rope".; Bron, the official who oversees the Valley Plant and Lyserg Diethel's progress in the Shaman Fight. His guardian spirit is a spider named "Blue Net".; Renim, the overseer of the Jungle Plant who helps Bron in re-educating those who stray from the way of the Patch Tribe. His guardian spirit is a chameleon called "Clear Coat".; Thalim, the officiant and overseer of the Beach Plant who is responsible on Team Kabbalahers amongst other teams. His versatile spirit is the Green Seeds, which has access to the different properties and abilities of every kind of Plant on the planet.; Rutherfor, the priestess of the Patch Tribe who oversees the Space Plant and escorts Hao Asakura to the King's shrine, serving as his last line of defense while he merges with the Great Spirit. Her spirit ally, called "Grey Saucer", created an armored Over Soul for her to wear.; Zinc, the shaman of the Patch Tribe who along with Nichrom fights Silva and Kalim when they attempt to help Yoh Asakura. His guardian spirit is a vulture or a buzzard.	Reiko Suzuki (Goldva); Hikaru Midorikawa (Silva); Kazuhiro Nakata (Kalim); Kentarō Itō (Nichrom); Satoshi Yamaguchi (Magna); Yasuhiro Mamiya (Radim); Shohei Kajikawa (Namari); Jiro Saito (Bron); Akihiro Tajima (Renim); Kōji Okino (Thalim); Hekiru Shiina (Rutherfor); Susumu Chiba (Zinc)	
Bill Yellow Hawk	South Park	He is a gay Native American man who develops his feelings for Randy Marsh after being kissed by him in Season 21 episode "Holiday Special".	N/A	
Chief Running Water	South Park	He is the chief of the Ute tribe who claimed to be the father of Eric Cartman in the Season 1 episode "Cartman's Mom Is a Dirty Slut".	Matt Stone	
Chief Runs-With-Premise	South Park	He is the greedy Indian chief and the owner of Three Feathers Indian Casino who plots to demolish South Park in the Season 7 episode "Red Man's Greed". His son Premise-Running-Thin, who has been very sick, shares a drink with one of the infected Chinese men.	Matt Stone	
Motorcycle Apaches	Speed Racer	A group of the tribal motorcycle gang who attack the convey of trucks in the American West in Episode 46. The leader of the motorcycle Apaches is Geronimo, the son of the chief who admires Speed Racer and his Mach 5 car and attempts to protect his tribe from the uraniumtane.	Jack Grimes; Jack Curtis	
Eddy Skycedar	Spirit Rangers	Three Chumash-Cowlitz siblings who have the power to teleport into a magical spirit dimension at the fictional Xus National Park in California. While in the spirit dimension, the three transform into an anthropomorphic turtle, grizzly bear, and red-tailed hawk respectively.	Talon Proc Alford	
Kodi Skycedar	Spirit Rangers	Three Chumash-Cowlitz siblings who have the power to teleport into a magical spirit dimension at the fictional Xus National Park in California. While in the spirit dimension, the three transform into an anthropomorphic turtle, grizzly bear, and red-tailed hawk respectively.	Wačíŋyeya Iwáš'aka Yracheta	
Summer Skycedar	Spirit Rangers	Three Chumash-Cowlitz siblings who have the power to teleport into a magical spirit dimension at the fictional Xus National Park in California. While in the spirit dimension, the three transform into an anthropomorphic turtle, grizzly bear, and red-tailed hawk respectively.	Isis Celilo Rogers	
Mixtli	Spirit Riding Free	Mixtli is a teenage Tuckapaw boy who lives alone in a forest with his pet brown horse, Crow. He appears in Season 3 Episode 3 "Lucky and the Risky Rescue" and Pony Tales: Season 2 Episode 3 "The Healing Tree".	Bridger Zadina	
Professor Hawk Feathers	SuperMansion	Appeared in Season 1 Episode 5 "Puss in Books".	Wes Studi	
Little Bear	The Thanksgiving That Almost Wasn't	An Indian boy and one of the main characters of the Thanksgiving television special produced by Hanna-Barbera.	Kevin Cooper	
Indian	A Town Called Panic	The toy figurine of a stereotypical Native American chief or elder who is a little more mature than Cowboy but pursues foolhardy quests almost as much as his counterpart. There is also a spinoff feature film of the same name.	Bruce Ellison (original French); Alan Marriott (English dub)	
Brock Samson	The Venture Bros.	He is described as "half-Swedish, quarter-Polish, and quarter-Winnebago" from Nebraska.	Patrick Warburton	
Princess Tinyfeet	The Venture Bros.	A stereotypical Native American girl who bears a striking resemblance to Mia on the Land O'Lakes logo and was also the wife of Sergeant Hatred. She is the daughter of Indian crimefighter Chief Justice.	Suzanne Gilad (briefly)	
Kahhori	What If...?	A young Mohawk woman, living in pre-colonial America, gains the power of the Tesseract and convinces those in Sky World to join her to save her people from ravenous conquistadors, who she drives away with her help. The episode was created in collaboration with the Mohawk Nation, with the episode's dialogue in the Mohawk language.	Devery Jacobs	
J.R.	Wild West C.O.W.-Boys of Moo Mesa	A Native American bison who tends to ramble about the scientific principles of his inventions and occasionally aids the trio of the C.O.W.-Boys whenever the situation needs it.	Michael Horse	
Ellen Crow	Wildfire	An Indian girl who provides moral support on Earth.	Lilly Moon	
Tye Longshadow	Young Justice	Tye is a metahuman with the ability of astral projection, allowing him to project a large energy aura. He is loosely based on Apache Chief.	Gregg Rainwater	

== Radio ==
Native American	Radio title	Notes	Voice actor(s)	Ref(s)
Tonto	The Lone Ranger	1933 WXYZ radio show prior to the television series of the same name.	John Todd	
Little Beaver	Red Ryder	1942 radio series based on the Western comic strip of the same name.	Tommy Cook (1942); Frank Bresee (1942–46); Henry Blair (1944–47); Johnny McGovern (1947–50); Anne Whitfield (1950–51); Sammy Ogg (1950–51)	

== Video games ==
Native American	Game title	Console(s)	Notes	Ref(s)
Desmond Miles	Assassin's Creed	PS3; Xbox 360; Windows	A main protagonist of the series' early games who is a descendant of Ratonhnhaké:ton.	
Kahionhaténion	Assassin's Creed III	PS3; Xbox 360; Wii U; Windows; PS4; Xbox One; Switch	The Kanien'kehá:ka warrior and hunter.	
Kanenʼtó꞉kon	Assassin's Creed III	PS3; Xbox 360; Wii U; Windows; PS4; Xbox One; Switch	He was a close friend of Ratonhnhaké꞉ton.	
Kaniehtí꞉io (Ziio)	Assassin's Creed III	PS3; Xbox 360; Wii U; Windows; PS4; Xbox One; Switch	She was a Kanien'keha:ka clan woman and the mother of Ratonhnhaké:ton.	
Ratonhnhaké:ton/Connor	Assassin's Creed III	PS3; Xbox 360; Wii U; Windows; PS4; Xbox One; Switch	The protagonist who is half English and half Mohawk Indian.	
Teiowí:sonte	Assassin's Creed III	PS3; Xbox 360; Wii U; Windows; PS4; Xbox One; Switch	The Kanien'keha:ka warrior and the brother of Kahionhaténion.	
William Miles	Assassin's Creed III	PS3; Xbox 360; Wii U; Windows; PS4; Xbox One; Switch	Father of Desmond Miles from which he is related to Ratonhnhaké:ton.	
Kesegowaase	Assassin's Creed Rogue	PS3; Xbox 360; Windows; PS4; Xbox One	The minor antagonist who is an Abenaki assassin.	
Humba Wumba	Banjo-Tooie	Nintendo 64; Xbox 360	The Indian woman and one of the major characters of the game.	
Condor Heads	Breakers	Arcade; Neo Geo; Neo-Geo CD	The Native American fighter.	
Colton White	Gun	Windows; PS2; Xbox; GameCube; Xbox 360; PSP	Also known simply as Cole, he is the Apache marksman who has been adopted by well-trained outdoorsman Ned White.	
Fights-At-Dawn	Gun	Windows; PS2; Xbox; GameCube; Xbox 360; PSP	The Blackfoot chief and a proud warrior who is concerned deeply for the future of his tribe and befriends Colton when he was attacked by a cougar.	
Many Wounds	Gun	Windows; PS2; Xbox; GameCube; Xbox 360; PSP	An Apache chief who becomes a trusted ally to Colton to fight against the villainous Tom Magruder.	
Delsin Rowe	Infamous Second Son	PlayStation 4	The member of the fictional Akomish tribe and the protagonist of the game.	
Reggie Rowe	Infamous Second Son	PlayStation 4	He is the brother of Delsin.	
Pakawa	Kasumi Ninja	Atari Jaguar	Chief of the fictional Tu-Wee-Kah Comanche fighting tribe.	
Chief Thunder	Killer Instinct (1994)	Arcade; SNES; Game Boy; Xbox One	The Native American chief who is armed with a pair of tomahawks.	
Eagle	Killer Instinct (2013)	Xbox One; Windows	An Indian warrior and the younger brother of Chief Thunder.	
Nightwolf	Mortal Kombat	Arcade	He is a Native American shaman.	
Nuna	Never Alone (Kisima Inŋitchuŋa)	Linux; Windows; OS X; PS3; PS4; Wii U; Xbox One; iOS; Android; Switch	She is an Iñupiaq girl who along with her Arctic fox companion searches out the source of an eternal blizzard that threatens her village. Based on the traditional Iñupiat mythology Kunuuksaayuka.	
Fareeha Amari (Pharah)	Overwatch	Windows; PS4; Xbox One; Switch	Her father Sam is from unknown First Nations tribe.	
Domasi "Tommy" Tawodi	Prey	Linux; Mac OS X; Windows; Xbox 360; Symbian; Zeebo	A Cherokee mechanic and the main protagonist of the game.	
Enisi	Prey	Linux; Mac OS X; Windows; Xbox 360; Symbian; Zeebo	The grandfather of Tommy.	
Jen	Prey	Linux; Mac OS X; Windows; Xbox 360; Symbian; Zeebo	She is the girlfriend of Tommy.	
Nastas	Red Dead Redemption	PlayStation 3; Xbox 360	A minor character who aids John Marston in stopping the gang of the most Native Americans led by villainous Dutch van der Linde.	
Enepay	Red Dead Redemption	PlayStation 3; Xbox 360	A minor antagonist who rides as a rebel under Dutch van der Linde.	
Charles Smith	Red Dead Redemption 2	PlayStation 4; Xbox One; Windows; Stadia	A supporting character who is half Native American on his mother's side who aids Arthur Morgan and is also a member of the Van der Linde gang.	
Rains Fall	Red Dead Redemption 2	PlayStation 4; Xbox One; Windows; Stadia	Chief of the fictional Wapiti Tribe.	
Eagle Flies	Red Dead Redemption 2	PlayStation 4; Xbox One; Windows; Stadia	Son of Rains Falls who is driven to lead his tribe in rebellion against the U.S. Army over their mistreatment.	
Paytah	Red Dead Redemption 2	PlayStation 4; Xbox One; Windows; Stadia	A minor character who is a friend of Eagle Flies.	
Falling Star	Red Dead Revolver	PlayStation 2; Xbox	She was the mother of Red Harlow and the daughter of Chief Running Moon.	
Red Harlow	Red Dead Revolver	PlayStation 2; Xbox	The main protagonist who is half Native American on his mother's side.	
Shadow Wolf	Red Dead Revolver	PlayStation 2; Xbox	He is the Native American cousin of Red Harlow.	
Natan	Shadow Hearts: From the New World	PlayStation 2	He is the bounty hunting bodyguard of Shania.	
Shania	Shadow Hearts: From the New World	PlayStation 2	She is the Native American priestess and the love interest of Johnny Garland.	
Noembelu	Street Fighter Alpha 3	Arcade; PlayStation; Dreamcast; Sega Saturn; GBA; PSP	She is a Native Mexican woman who has been brainwashed by the evil organization, Shadaloo, to become one of M. Bison's female elite guards called the Dolls.	
Thunder Hawk (T. Hawk)	Street Fighter II	Arcade; SNES; Mega Drive/Genesis; Amiga; Fujitsu FM Towns; PC DOS; Sharp X68000; PlayStation; Sega Saturn	He is the Native Mexican warrior and the member of the fictional Thunderfoot indigenous clan, the son of its chief Arroyo Hawk.	
Chief Scalpem	Sunset Riders	Arcade; Mega Drive/Genesis; SNES	One of the eight bosses of the game.	
Nahova	Ta•o Taido	Arcade		
Michelle Chang	Tekken	Various	She is a young woman of Native American and Chinese descent.	
Julia Chang	Tekken	Various	The adoptive daughter of Michelle.	
Red Bear	Tengai Makyō: Daiyon no Mokushiroku	Sega Saturn; PSP	The American Indian elder who was the legendary monster-hunter and raised protagonist Raijin from an early age. He was ultimately killed in Alaska when he tried to slay "Pure Silver" Blizzard.	
Yūnō	Tengai Makyō: Daiyon no Mokushiroku	Sega Saturn; PSP	The teenage Indian warrior girl who is well-renowned as a member of the "Three Warriors of Seattle" alongside her lover Scar Wolf and her friend Low Dog in Seattle. She bears the sign of the "Flame Hero", among the others.	
Turok	Turok games	various	He is the protagonist of the video game series based on the comic books of the same name.	
Joshua Fireseed	Turok 2: Seeds of Evil	Nintendo 64; Microsoft Windows; Xbox One; Nintendo Switch	One of the main characters of the game.	
Danielle Fireseed	Turok 3: Shadow of Oblivion	Nintendo 64	The sister of Joshua.	

== Mascots and others ==
Native American	Use	Notes	Ref(s)
Chief Noc-A-Homa	Atlanta Braves	He was the original mascot for the Milwaukee and Atlanta Braves from 1966 until by 1986.	
Princess Win-A-Lotta	Atlanta Braves	She was joining Chief Noc-A-Homa in 1983 until the following year.	
Chief Wahoo	Cleveland Indians	The retired logo icon of the MLB franchise, the Cleveland Indians (renamed Cleveland Guardians).	
Osceola	Florida State Seminoles	The current mascot of the athletic teams representing Florida State University. He is frequently portrayed riding his horse, Renegade, and represents the historical figure of Osceola, the Seminole war-chief. There were the previous mascots of the Seminoles years prior, long before Osceola took over: Sammy Seminole; Chief Wampumstompum/Fullabull; Yahola, otherwise known as the "spirit chief"	
Yellow Feather	Great Wolf Resorts	An audio-animatronic figure of a Native American girl for the Great Clock Tower Show at the Great Wolf Lodge resorts.	
Mia	Land O'Lakes	The depiction of a young, kneeling, Native American woman was the logo for the butter packaging from 1928 until she was removed from all their products in April 2020.	
Chief Illiniwek	University of Illinois at Urbana–Champaign	The former symbol and mascot of UIUC from 1926 to 2007.	

== See also ==
- Stereotypes of indigenous peoples of Canada and the United States
- How (greeting)
