= Larry Sellers =

American actor (1949–2021)

- Born: October 2, 1949; Pawhuska, Oklahoma, U.S.
- Died: December 9, 2021 (aged 72)
- Occupations: Television and film actor, stuntman
- Years active: 1985–2021

Larry Sellers (October 2, 1949 – December 9, 2021) was an Osage American actor and stuntman.

== Background ==
Sellers was born in Pawhuska, Oklahoma, where he grew up. After graduating high school, he joined the U.S. Navy.

== Acting career ==
Sellers commonly portrayed Native American characters such as his role as Cloud Dancing on Dr. Quinn, Medicine Woman. For his time on Dr. Quinn, Sellers is credited as the show's Native American consultant. His other roles included the "Naked Indian" spirit from Wayne's World 2. His final film role was the Osage Non-Hon-Zhin-Ga in Killers of the Flower Moon, released after his death.

== Language advocacy ==
Sellers was an Osage language instructor at the Osage Language Department and ceremonial leader.

== Death ==
Sellers died on December 9, 2021, at the age of 72.

== Filmography ==
=== Film ===
Year	Title	Role	Notes
1985	Revolution	Honchwah	
1986	Agent on Ice	Hubbards	Also stunt and stunt coordinator
1987	Assassination	Indian Joe	
1987	Like Father Like Son	Navajo Helper	
1991	Son of the Morning Star		
1993	Fugitive Nights: Danger in the Desert	Vega	
1993	Wayne's World 2	Naked Indian	
1994	Lightning Jack	Comanche Leader	
1995	Skullduggery	Indian	Short film
2006	Sacred Blood	The Baron	Direct-to-DVD
2007	Four Sheets to the Wind	Cufe's Uncle	Uncredited
2013	Four Winds		Short film
2023	Killers of the Flower Moon	Non-Hon-Zhin-Ga	

=== Television ===
Year	Title	Role	Notes
1986	Crime Story	Indian 'Billy Running Bird'	Episode: "Pilot"
1987	The Quick and the Dead	Running Wolf	TV movie
1987	Kenny Rogers as The Gambler, Part III: The Legend Continues	First Indian	TV movie
1989	Life Goes On	Mythic Indian	Episode: "Call of the Wild"
1993–1998	Dr. Quinn, Medicine Woman	Cloud Dancing	77 episodes
1994	Walker, Texas Ranger	Tom Running Wolf	Episode: "Rainbow Warrior"
1995	Hawkeye	Tog-wah	Episode: "The Plague"
1995	Beverly Hills, 90210	The Cheyenne/Sheriff Al Whitefeather	2 episode
1996	Crazy Horse	Spotted Tail	TV movie
1999	Dr. Quinn, Medicine Woman: The Movie	Cloud Dancing	TV movie
2002	The Sopranos	Professor Del Redclay	Episode: "Christopher"
