= Gregg Rainwater =

American actor

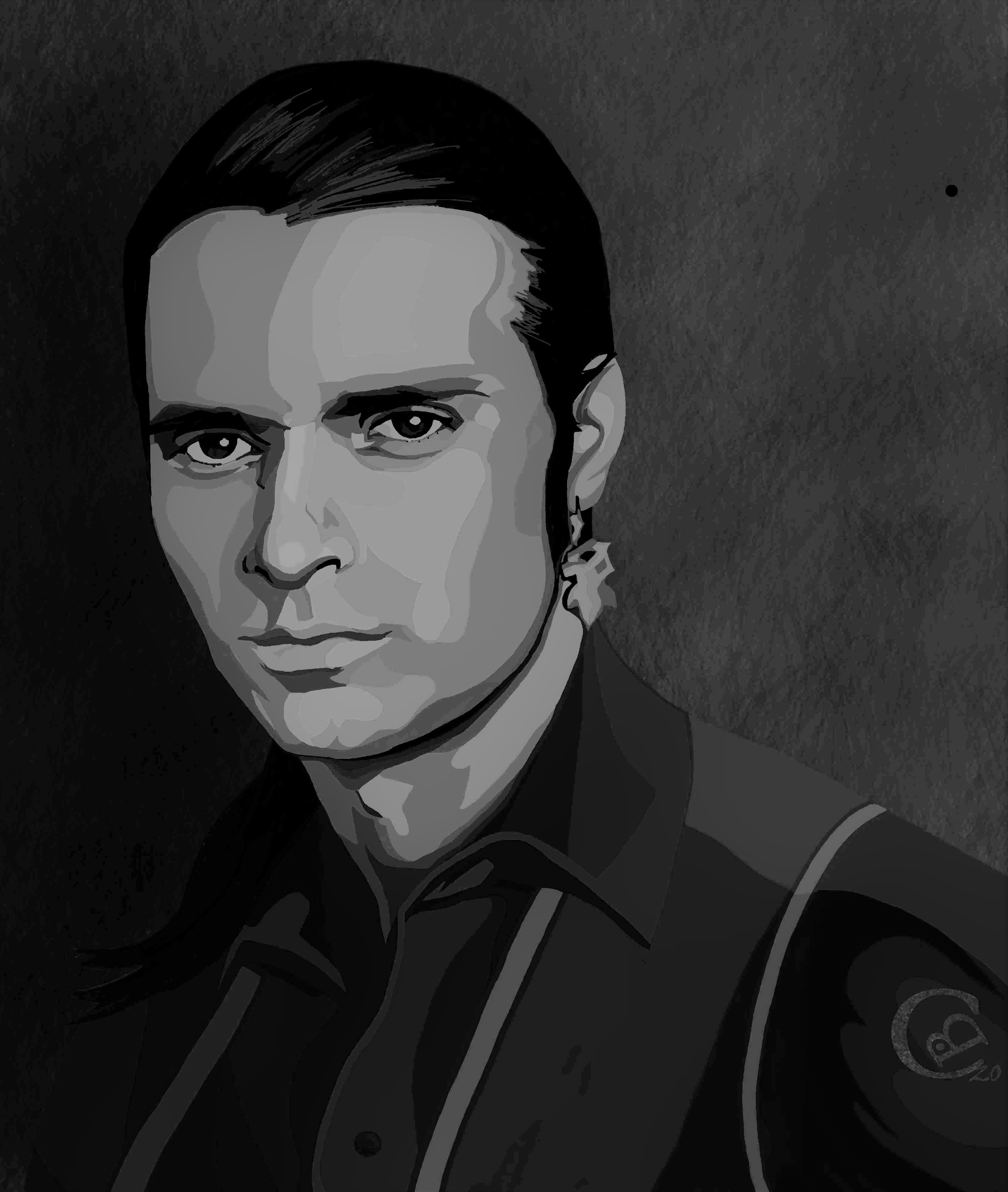
- Born: February 27, 1966 (age 60); Flint, Michigan, USA
- Occupation: Actor

Gregg Rainwater (born February 27, 1966) is an American actor who is best known for his roles as half-Kiowa Buck Cross on The Young Riders (1989–1992) and T. Hawk in Street Fighter (1994).

Rainwater has also guest-starred on Walker, Texas Ranger and Promised Land and worked as a voice actor in such works as Pocahontas II: Journey to a New World, Justice League Unlimited, Gargoyles, and Young Justice. He has also worked three seasons as an art director for America's Got Talent, and in April 2010 worked as Art Director on "American Idol - Idol Gives Back", for which he was nominated for a Primetime Emmy Award. Rainwater is a singer as well, and has toured England with the Warren Youth Chorale.

== Personal life ==
Rainwater describes himself as having Osage, Cherokee, Irish, and Filipino descent. He has said his grandfather was a Native American from Arkansas.

== Filmography ==
Year	Title	Role	Notes
1989–1992	The Young Riders	Running Buck Cross	67 episodes
1994	Walker, Texas Ranger	David Little Eagle Johnson	Episode: "The Legend of Running Bear"
1994	Street Fighter	Sergeant T. Hawk	
1995–1996	Gargoyles	Coyote, Natsilane	Voice, 2 episodes
1997	Promised Land	Arthur Yazzi	Episode: "The Outrage"
1997	Ocean Tribe	Noah	
1997	3×3 Eyes: Legend of the Divine Demon	Jake McDonald	Voice
1998	Pocahontas II: Journey to a New World	Nakoma's husband, additional voices	
1999	How Does Anyone Get Old?	Gene	
1999	Foreign Correspondents	Marcel	Uncredited
1999	Pepper Ann	Bob, Andy	Voice, episode: "Dances with Ignorance"
2000	Max Steel	Jake Nez	Voice, 3 episodes
2004	Justice League Unlimited	Long Shadow	Voice, episode: "Ultimatum"
2012–2013	Young Justice	Tye Longshadow	Voice, 3 episodes

== Audio books ==
Year	Title	Role
2015	Rain of the Ghosts	Alonso Cacique, Billy Zekaris
