= Basil F. Heath =

American actor

Basil F. Heath (March 18, 1917 – January 24, 2011), better-known by his stage name, Chief White Eagle, was an actor, stuntman and television personality whose career spanned several decades beginning with the 1940 film, Northwest Passage. He also appeared in television programming in the Chicago, Illinois, area.

== Biography ==
Basil F. Heath was born on March 18, 1917. Although he claimed to be of Mohawk ancestry, after his death, his wife stated that Heath's parents were actually Andrew Cleve and Amelia (née De Amorim) Heath. Heath attended McGill University in Montreal, Quebec, and Oxford University, in the United Kingdom. After moving to the United States, Heath served as a liaison officer for the United States Office of War Information during World War II, as well as a volunteer member of the United States Army’s 101st Airborne Division during the war.

He began his career as a welder and iron worker in skyscraper construction in Chicago and other cities. He then became a stuntman before transitioning to on-screen film roles. His first film role came in the 1940 movie, Northwest Passage, which starred Spencer Tracy. He appeared in more than thirty films throughout his career, including Red River, and Niagara.

As "Chief White Eagle" he hosted Totem Club on WTTW in Chicago during the 1960s, including a segment called "Indian Stories with Chief White Eagle". The show was one of the first children's programs to debut on WTTW, a PBS affiliate based out of Chicago. He also hosted a radio show, appeared in television and radio commercials and appeared as a guest on television series, Wagon Train. He was known for his appearances in which he wore a plains-style headdress.

Heath married his wife, Roberta “Bobbi Bear” Heath, on June 29, 1977. He resided in Tinley Park, Illinois, from 1975 until 1990. He and his family then moved to Rochester, Indiana, where he lived for the rest of his life.

In 1996, Heath reflected on his acting career and the role of Native Americans in western films saying, "The Indians were always the losers...For years, the movie industry portrayed the Indians in a derogatory manner. Happily, today, Indian films are more credible."

He died at Woodlawn Hospital in Rochester, Indiana, at 2:35 a.m. on January 24, 2011, at the age of 93. He was survived by his wife, Roberta “Bobbi Bear” Heath; daughter, Eunice Madeline Heath Collard; his adopted son, Kenneth "Lone Eagle" Heath; and grandchildren and great-grandchildren. He was predeceased by his daughter, Lauraine Heath, and his two sisters, Sylvia Schroeder and Valerie Peterson.

== Selected filmography ==
- Trails of the Golden West (1931)
- End of the Trail - Chief Grey Beard (1932)
- Stagecoach - Indian Chief (uncredited) (1939)
- Last of the Redmen - Indian (uncredited) (1947)
- Red River - Indian Chief (uncredited) (1948)
- How the West Was Won - Arapajo Chief (uncredited) (1962)
- McLintock! - Running Buffalo (uncredited) (1963)
