= Jim Boyd (musician) =

American singer-songwriter

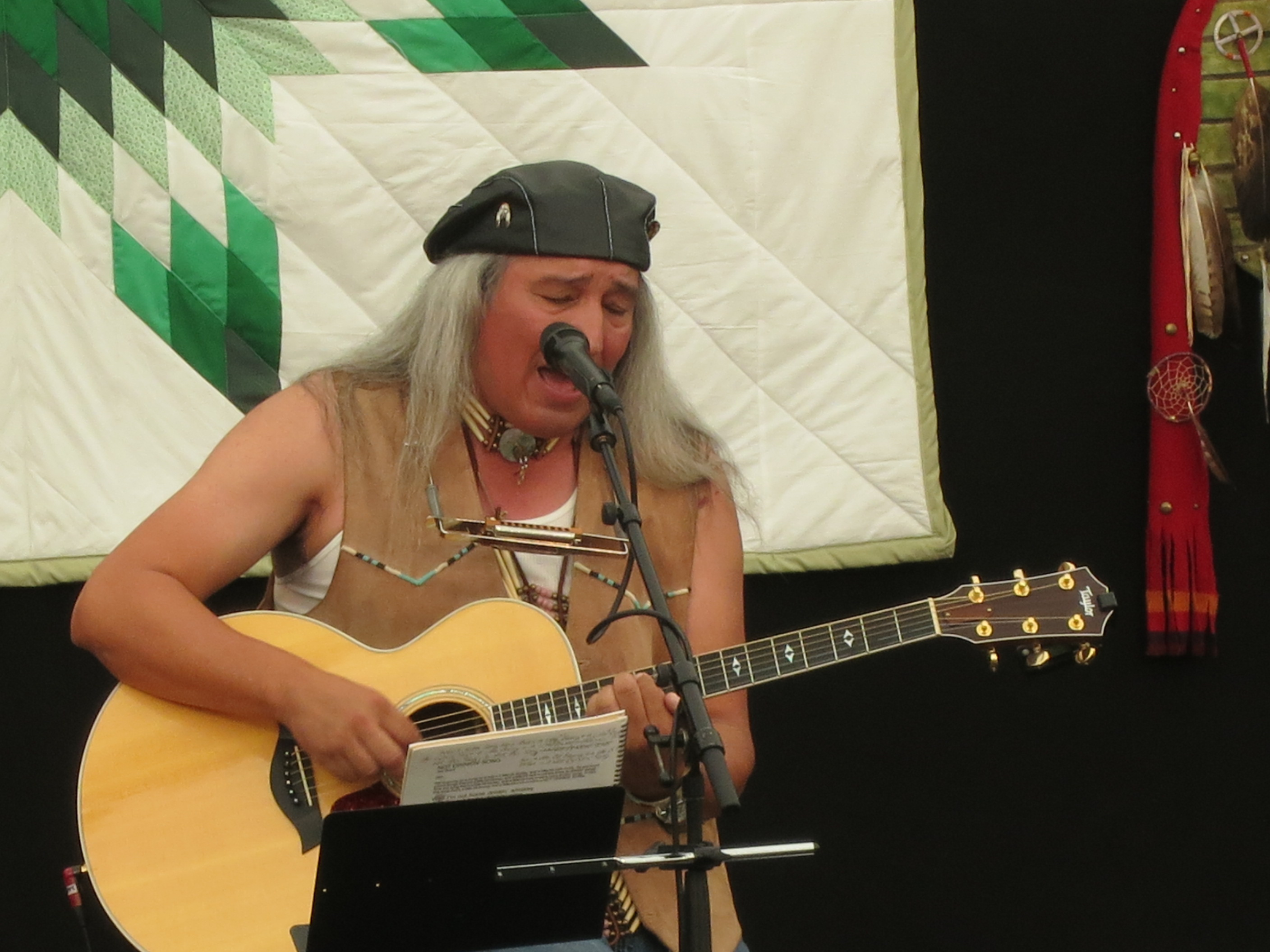
Jim Boyd in concert

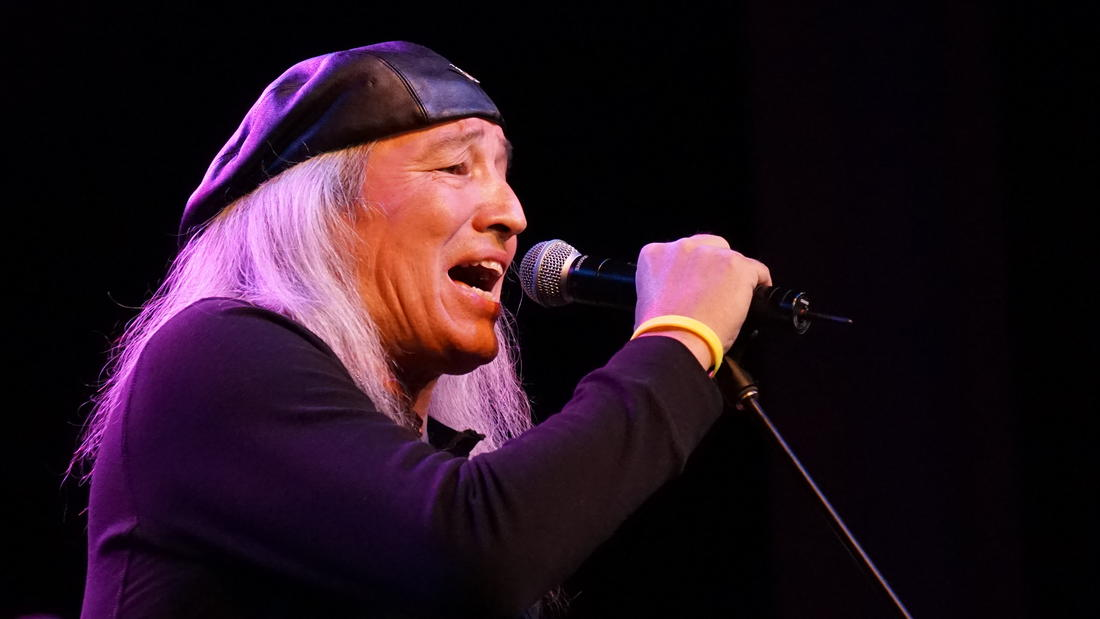
Jim Boyd performing at the Native American Music Awards

Jim Boyd (January 1, 1956 – June 22, 2016) was a Native American singer-songwriter, actor, and member of the Jim Boyd Band on the Colville Indian Reservation in Washington. Boyd performed in several groups, including XIT, Greywolf, and Winterhawk. Boyd performed four songs with lyrics by Sherman Alexie on the soundtrack for the 1998 movie Smoke Signals, and also appeared in Alexie's 2002 film The Business of Fancydancing.

Boyd was a seven-time award winner of the Native American Music Awards and a Lifetime Achievement Award recipient. At the 2nd Annual Native American Music Awards, he was awarded the award for Best Compilation Recording for the Smoke Signals soundtrack; at the 5th Annual Native American Music Awards, he won Record of the Year for his recording, AlterNatives. The next year he was awarded the Best Pop/Rock Recording for Live at the Met; at the 7th Annual Native American Music Awards he received Record of the Year for Going to the Stick Games; he received Songwriter of the Year at the 8th Annual Native American Music Awards for Them Old Guitars; he won Best Short Form Music Video for Inchelium at the 9th Annual Native American Music Awards; and he received the Artist of the Year Award at the 10th Annual Native American Music Awards.

On November 14, 2014, Boyd was presented with a Lifetime Achievement Award for his outstanding contributions in the field of Native American music at the 15th Annual commemoration held at the Seneca Allegany Casino & Hotel in Salamanca, New York.

Boyd lived in Spokane, Washington. He died on June 22, 2016. At the time of his death, he was serving his second term on the Colville Business Council as chairman and was standing for re-election. He was previously the Culture Committee chairman, Vice-Chairman of the Business Council, and Chairman of the Law & Justice Committee.
