= Creeasian =

Cree-Vietnamese artist

- Born: Matthew Wood
- Occupations: Musician, multimedia artist, teacher

Matthew Wood, known professionally as Creeasian, is a Cree-Vietnamese musician, multimedia artist, and teacher. His artistry spans hip-hop, grassdancing, and deejaying, as well as film and theater. In 2021, he served one year as Edmonton's Indigenous Artist in Residence.

== Early life ==
Creeasian has both Cree and Vietnamese ancestry. Hailing from Alberta, Creeasian was "mainly raised" by his late mother, Diane Wood, who brought him up in Indigenous traditions like sweat lodges, round dances, and powwows.

During his teenage years, he also got more into hip-hop and found it to be a form that "brought me back full circle to my heritage, and it allowed me to be Indigenous, to put those Grassdance moves into my breaking."

== Career ==
Creeasian has performed sets at Play the Parks, Sled Island Music and Arts Festival, and the Virtual Pow Wow. He has also supported shows by Snotty Nose Rez Kids and A Tribe Called Red.

During his Edmonton residency in 2021, Creeasian intended to "explore Cree language, sound and storytelling" through public artwork. He also worked on film and theater projects with Dreamspeakers and the Film and Video Arts Society of Alberta.

Creeasian also runs the Sample Cafe, an educational nonprofit teaching music production, and is the founder of CypherWild YEG, a block party initiative in Edmonton.
