= Cynthia Geary =

American actress (born 1965)

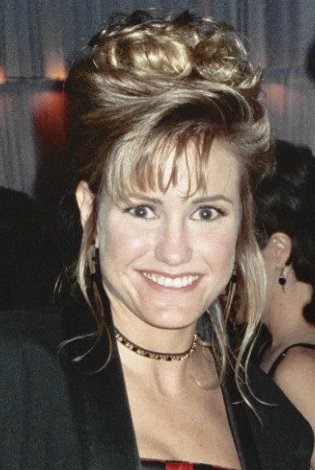
- Geary in 1993
- Born: March 21, 1965 (age 61); Jackson, Mississippi, U.S.
- Education: University of Mississippi
- Occupation: Actress
- Years active: 1982–present
- Spouse: Robert Coron (m. 1993; div. 2018)
- Children: 2

Cynthia Geary (born March 21, 1965) is an American actress. She is best known for her role as Shelly Tambo on the television series Northern Exposure (1990–1995), which earned her two Primetime Emmy Award nominations.

== Early life and career ==
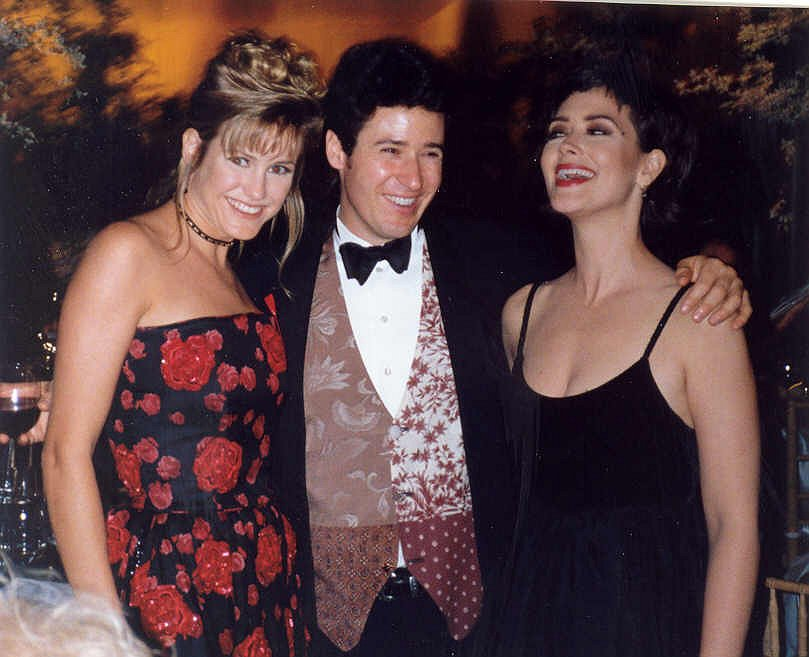
Cynthia Geary, Rob Morrow and Janine Turner at the 45th Primetime Emmy Awards Governor's Ball, September 1993

Cynthia Geary was born and raised in Jackson, Mississippi, the youngest of four children born to John Hart Geary and Shirley Hester (the latter a voice and music teacher who encouraged her daughter to study voice, piano and ballet), Geary attended Jackson Preparatory School and the University of Mississippi, where she earned a Bachelor of Arts degree in vocal performance.

Her acting career began with a series of national commercials, including spots for Coca-Cola and General Motors. She soon had numerous guest starring roles on a variety of television programs, made-for-television movies and independent films, including a small part in Smoke Signals, a film based on the short stories of Native American author Sherman Alexie. Geary played the mother of the Olsen twins in their 1992 made-for-TV movie To Grandmother's House We Go, appeared in the 1997 movie When Time Expires, and is the female lead in 8 Seconds. She received Primetime Emmy nominations—two years in a row (1992, 1993)--for Best Supporting Actress, based on her role in Northern Exposure (1990-1995), an ensemble comedy set in rural Alaska. She voiced the character of Katia Anderson in the second game of the Professor Layton video game series, Professor Layton and the Diabolical/Pandora's Box.

Beginning in 2022, she starred for 2 seasons in the American Pureflix television series Going Home. In 2024, she recurs in the Netflix series Penelope as the title character's mother. She also filmed the independent movie Inheritance.

== Personal life ==
Geary married real estate broker Robert Coron in 1994. They divorced in 2018. They have two daughters.

== Filmography ==
=== Film ===
Year	Title	Role	Notes
1982	Young Doctors in Love	Girl with broken nose	Uncredited
1988	Dangerous Curves	Pageant Girl	
1990	Rich Girl	Sorority Girl #1	
1994	8 Seconds	Kellie Frost	
1997	When Time Expires	June Kelly	
1998	Smoke Signals	Cathy the Gymnast	
1998	The Killing Grounds	Janice Harper	
1998	Break Up	Emergency Operator	
2002	The Business of Fancydancing	Teresa	
2002	Mulletville	Jiffy	
2006	Expiration Date	Funeral Home Representative	
2009	Crimes of the Past	Agent Cotton	
2012	Switchmas	Libby Wilson	
2013	Nothing Against Life	Barbara Anker	
2014	Muffins	Woman 1	Short film
2015	Signs Everywhere	Wife	Short film
2016	Apotheosis	Eve	Short film
2023	Due Justice	Dr. Delaney	

=== Television ===
Year	Title	Role	Notes
1990–1995	Northern Exposure	Shelly Marie Tambo	Regular role, 110 episodes Nominated—Primetime Emmy Award for Outstanding Supporting Actress in a Drama Series (1992–93); Nominated—Screen Actors Guild Award for Outstanding Performance by an Ensemble in a Comedy Series
1990	The New Adam-12	Marine Bride	Episode: "Immunity"
1991	Us	Crystal	Television movie
1992	To Grandmother's House We Go	Rhonda Thompson	Television movie
1995	The Awakening	Sara	Television movie
1998	You're the One	Lindsay Metcalf	3 episodes
1998	The Outer Limits	Teryl Bouton	Episode: "Mary 25"
1998	Love Boat: The Next Wave	The Twins	Episode: "It Takes Two to Tango"
1998	Fantasy Island	Pamela Louis	Episode: "Dying to Dance"
1999	Dead Man's Gun	Dr. Megan Jane Price	Episode: "The Oath"
2012	Bigfoot	Sueanne	Television movie
2022-	Going Home	Charley Copeland	Regular role, Television series
