= The Lone Ranger and Tonto Fistfight in Heaven =

Book by Sherman Alexie

- First edition
- Author: Sherman Alexie
- Language: English
- Genre: Short stories
- Publisher: Perennial/Atlantic Monthly Press
- Publication date: 1993
- Publication place: United States
- Media type: Print (hardcover)
- Pages: 240 pp
- ISBN: 978-0-06-097624-8
- OCLC: 30437035

The Lone Ranger and Tonto Fistfight in Heaven is a 1993 collection of interconnected short stories by Sherman Alexie. The characters and stories in the book, particularly "This Is What It Means to Say Phoenix, Arizona", provided the basis of Alexie's screenplay for the film Smoke Signals.

The collection was originally released in 1993; it was reissued in 2005, with two new stories, by Grove Atlantic Press.

The Lone Ranger and Tonto Fistfight in Heaven, published in 1993 by Atlantic Monthly Press, was Sherman Alexie's breakthrough book. Composed of twenty-two interconnected stories with recurring characters, the work is often described by critics as a short-story collection, though some argue that it has novel-like features similar to Louise Erdrich's Love Medicine. The book's central characters, Victor Joseph and Thomas Builds-the-Fire, are two young Native American men living on the Spokane Indian Reservation, and the stories describe their relationships, desires, and histories with family members and others who live on the reservation. Alexie fuses surreal imagery, flashbacks, dream sequences, diary entries, and extended poetic passages with his storytelling to create tales that resemble prose poems more than conventional narratives.

The book's title is derived from one of the collection's stories, which details the experience of a Native American who leaves the reservation to live in Seattle with his white girlfriend and then moves back. The Lone Ranger and Tonto are symbols for white and Native American identity, respectively. The names are taken from a popular radio show which first aired in 1933, later leading to a series of books and then a television show in the 1950s in which a white man, the Lone Ranger, teams up with an Indian, Tonto, to battle evil in the old west. Alexie, who claims the title came to him from a dream, studs his stories with other references to popular culture to underscore the ways in which representations of Native Americans have played a part in constructing the image they, and others, now have of them. The book's popularity, in part, stems from James R. Kincaid's effusive praise of Alexie's collection of poetry and stories, The Business of Fancydancing (1992), in The New York Times Book Review. With Kincaid's review, Alexie, who had published with small presses, was thrust into the national spotlight. He deftly depicts the struggles of Native Americans to live in a world that remains hostile to their very survival, and he does so in an honest and artful manner. The Lone Ranger and Tonto Fistfight in Heaven earned a PEN-Hemingway nomination for best first book of fiction.

== Stories ==
"Every Little Hurricane"
Victor remembers the hardships of his childhood in the Spokane Reservation, particularly on his ninth year's New Year's Eve party at his parents' home.

"A Drug Called Tradition"
Victor remembers the drug-influenced bouts he and his friends had shared in their wild youths, and the romantic dreams about the Indians' "good old past", but soberly realizes that the dreams of either the past or the future are not what life is about.

"Because My Father Always Said He Was the Only Indian Who Saw Jimi Hendrix Play The Star Spangled Banner at Woodstock"
Victor reminisces about the few good memories he had of his father before he deserted his family.

"Crazy Horse Dreams"
Victor fails to meet a woman's image of the ideal Indian hero.

"The Only Traffic Signal on the Reservation Doesn't Flash Red Anymore"
Victor and Adrian discuss the rise and fall of their reservation basketball heroes and the dreams that they carried for their tribemates.

"Amusements"
Victor remembers a trip to the carnival with his friends Sadie and Dirty Joe, and their attempts to indulge in white man's pleasures and thus to cast aside their Indian identity.

"This Is What It Means to Say Phoenix, Arizona"
After Victor's father has died, Victor travels to Phoenix to collect his father's remains with the help of Thomas Builds-the-Fire. During their journey, Victor learns to his immense surprise that he and Thomas, as different as they are, have actually a lot more in common than he could have imagined.

"The Fun House"
A woman, frustrated by her husband and son, swims in a creek near her house and remembers meeting her husband and the birth of her son.

"All I Wanted to Do Was Dance"
Victor recounts several memories on the reservation.

"The Trial of Thomas Builds-the-Fire"
Because of his tendency to tell uncomfortable truths about the doings of the local Bureau of Indian Affairs and corrupt tribesmen, Thomas is brought before a court, where his compulsive story-telling earn him both a ridiculous verdict and the audience he has long sought.

"Distances"
An outlook on what the Indians would behave like if the white man had been eradicated from their ancient lands by some cataclysm and they would return to their traditions of old.

"Jesus Christ's Half-Brother Is Alive and Well on the Spokane Indian Reservation"
The narrator gives account, year by year, of raising Rosemary MorningDove and Frank Many Horses' son James.

"A Train Is an Order of Occurrence Designed to Lead to Some Result"
Samuel Builds-the-Fire, Thomas's grandfather, loses his job on his birthday, reminisces about his storytelling past, and finally, consumed by despair, lays his head in the path of an oncoming train.

"A Good Story"
A story within a story. The narrator, Junior, tells a story to his mother about a man named Uncle Moses telling a story to a young boy named Arnold.

"The First Annual All-Indian Horseshoe Pitch and Barbecue"
Gives account of several different events taking place on The First Annual All-Indian Horseshoe Pitch and Barbecue.

"Imagining the Reservation"
A collection of reflections on the importance of imagination for Indian survival.

"The Approximate Size of My Favorite Tumor"
James Many Horses learns he is dying of cancer and reflects on the history of his marriage to his wife, Norma, who at first does not understand his humorous attitude in the face of his looming demise.

"Indian Education"
Grade by grade Victor remembers his education.

"The Lone Ranger and Tonto Fistfight in Heaven"
Caught up in his daily frustration, the unnamed first-person narrator remembers the part of his life when he was living with a white woman and living a life outside the reservation and his Indian self.

"Family Portrait"
Narrator, Junior, discusses several themes of portraits, perspective and memory. What we say versus what we mean. How perspective shapes memory and significance.

"Somebody Kept Saying Powwow"
An ode to Norma. Narrated by Junior.

"Witnesses, Secret and Not"
The narrator and his father travel to Spokane to give an interview with a detective about a lost friend.

"Flight"
(added in 2005 reissue)

"Junior Polatkin's Wild West Show"
(added in 2005 reissue)

== Awards ==
- Hemingway Foundation/PEN Award: Best First Book of Fiction Citation Winner
- Lila Wallace-Reader's Digest Writers' Award
- Washington State Governor's Writers Award
- The Best American Short Stories 1994 includes "This Is What It Means to Say Phoenix, Arizona"

== See also ==
- Native American Renaissance
- Native American Studies
- Smoke Signals
- Reservation Blues
