= Bustle (disambiguation) =

A bustle is a type of framework used to expand the fullness or support the drapery of the back of a woman's dress, popular during the mid-to-late 19th century.

Bustle also refers to:

- Bustle (regalia), a traditional part of a Native American man's regalia worn during a dance exhibition or wachipi or pow wow
- Bustle (magazine), an online women's magazine

== See also ==
- Bustle rack – a way of storing gear on tanks
