= Grass dance =

Style of Native American dance

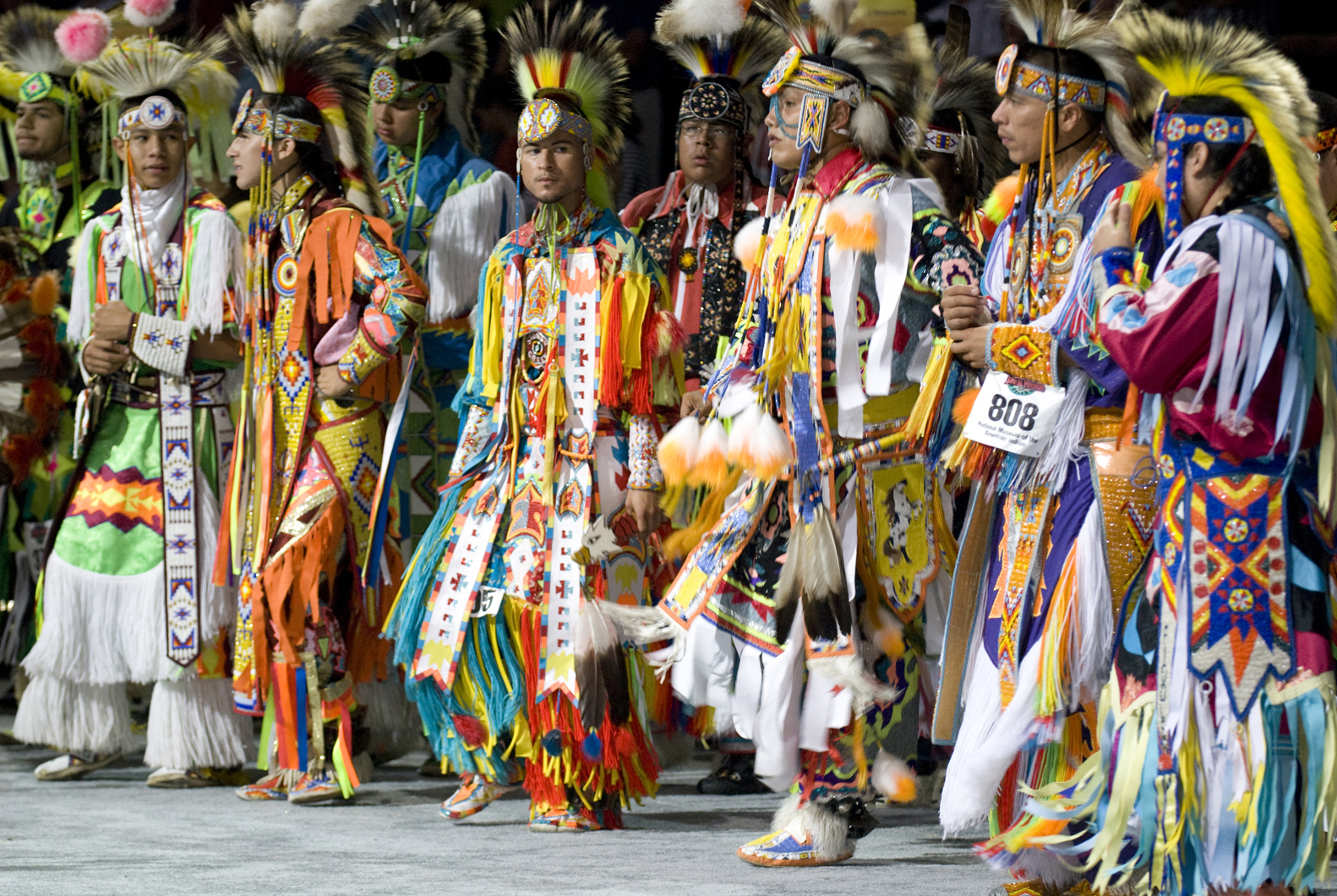
Grass dancers at the 2007 National Pow Wow

The grass dance or Omaha dance is a style of modern Native American men's pow wow dancing originating in the warrior societies on the Northern Great Plains. Unlike most forms of pow wow dancing, the grass dance regalia generally has no feathers besides the occasional roach feather. The regalia consists of brightly colored fringe made of either yarn, broadcloth, or ribbon.

== Origins ==
The original creators of the grass dance and the purpose of the dance are widely contested. Sources attribute possible origins to the Omaha, Pawnee, Anishnabe people, Ponca, Dakota, or Ho-Chunk tribes. While the specific tribe of origin is unknown, it is generally accepted as a Northern Plains dance that was used by warrior societies.

There are several stories behind the origins of the grass dance. One is that a medicine man told a handicapped boy to seek inspiration in the prairie. There he observed the swaying of the grass and received a vision of himself dancing the same style as the grass. When he shared this vision with his village, the use of his legs was returned to him and he performed the first grass dance.

Other origins attribute the grass dance to scouts blessing and flattening the grass for a ceremony, Dance or battle. The dancers would also then tie braided grass into their belts. Tying grass to the belt is believed to have led to the yarn and ribbons common today.

== Description ==
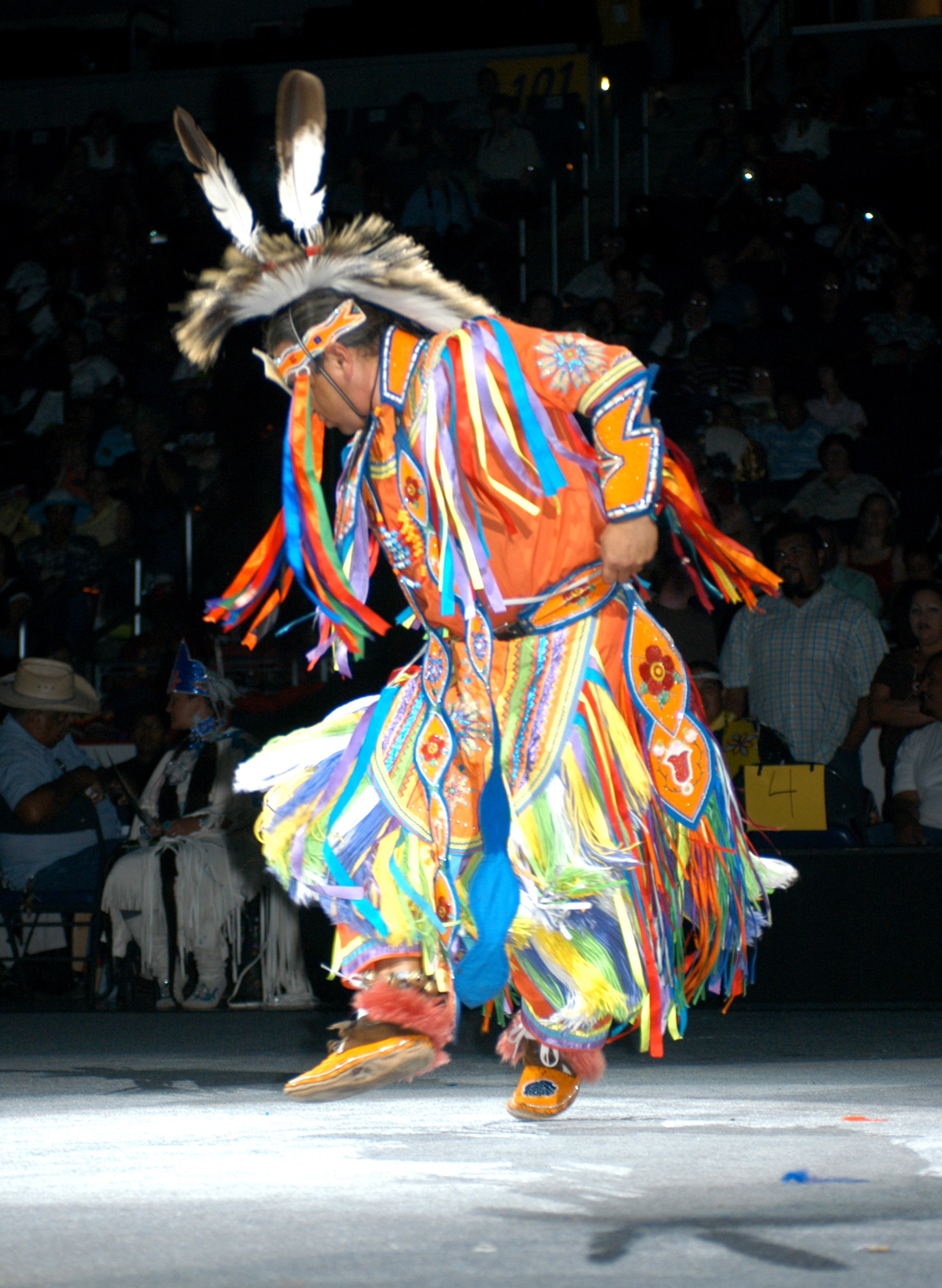
Grass dancer at the 2005 National Pow Wow.

The grass dance is a fast-paced dance consisting of sweeping motions and symmetry. It is generally faster than Northern Tradition or Straight style dancing, but not as fast as a Fancy dance. Like with most pow wow dances, the dancer brings his foot down to tap or step on the drum beat. Whatever the grass dancer does on one side of his body, he must also do that on the other side to create symmetry and mimic waving grass. Wide sweeping motions and tapping are also used to imitate laying down the grass. Other movements show a warrior stalking the enemy or game through tall grass. One dance steps typical of this involves one foot being firmly planted on the ground while the rest of the body moves around it. This is said to show a warrior still fighting when one foot has been staked down.

The main difference between grass dance regalia and the regalia of the other pow wow styles is that there are very few if any feathers compared to bustles of most men's dances. The regalia of the grass dancer instead consists of brightly colored fringe made of yarn or ribbon. While most dances involve making the bustle move, the grass dancer is instead intent on the swaying of the fringe. The dancer wears a roach headdress with either one to two feathers or two fluff antennae. A fully or partially beaded set consists of an "H-Harness" (two long suspenders that hang to below the knees and a belt), cuffs, headband, and side tabs. Grass dancers normally carry feather fans, mirror board, scarves, dream catchers, hoops, or dance sticks.
