= Ten Little Indians (short story collection) =

2004 short story collection by Sherman Alexie

First edition (publ. Grove Press)

Ten Little Indians is a 2004 short story collection by Sherman Alexie. The collection contains nine stories all of which focus on the Spokane tribe of Native Americans in Washington state.

== Stories ==
- The Search Engine
- Lawyer's League
- Can I Get a Witness?
- Do Not Go Gentle
- Flight Patterns
- The Life and Times of Estelle Walks Above
- Do You Know Where I Am?
- What You Pawn I Will Redeem
- Whatever Happened to Frank Snake Church

== Reviews ==
- Bergen-Aurand, Anne (2003). "Ten Little Indians (review)". Rain Taxi.
- Crispin, Jessica (July 18, 2003). "Sherman Alexie (review)". The Austin Chronicle.
- Grinnell, Jim (2004). "Ten Little Indians (review)" (PDF). The Bloomsbury Review.
- Harris, Michael (June 15, 2003). "A satisfying serving of everyday magic, on wry (review)". Los Angeles Times.
- Jaggi, Maya (January 21, 2004). "Stateless in Seattle (review)". The Guardian.
- Kipen, David (June 29, 2003). "Way off the reservation / The Indians in Alexie's fiction are out for redemption (review)". San Francisco Chronicle.
- "Ten Little Indians (review)". Kirkus Reviews. April 15, 2003.
- Maslin, Janet (May 26, 2003). "Where the Men Are Manly And the Indians Bemused (review)". The New York Times.
- Urquhart, James (January 5, 2004). "Ten Little Indians by Sherman Alexie (review)". Independent.
- Weinberger, Eric (June 15, 2003). "Off the Reservation (review)". The New York Times.
