= Reservation Blues =

1995 novel by Sherman Alexie

- First edition cover
- Author: Sherman Alexie
- Language: English
- Publication date: 1995
- Publication place: United States
- Media type: Print (Hardcover)
- Pages: 306
- ISBN: 978-0-87113-594-0

Reservation Blues is a 1995 novel by American writer Sherman Alexie, a citizen of the Spokane Tribe and descendant of the Coeur d'Alene Tribe.

== Plot summary ==
The novel follows the story of the rise and fall of Coyote Springs, a rock and blues band of Spokane Indians from the Spokane Reservation. In 1995, Thomas Builds-The-Fire, Junior Polatkin, and Victor Joseph, who also appear in Sherman Alexie's earlier short story collection The Lone Ranger and Tonto Fistfight in Heaven, meet American blues musician Robert Johnson. Johnson had sold his soul to the devil in 1931 and claims to have faked his death seven years later. The three Spokane men start a band: Thomas Builds-The-Fire on bass and lead vocals, Junior Polatkin on drums, and Victor Joseph using Johnson's enchanted guitar; they are later joined by Chess and Checkers Warm Water, sisters from the Flathead Indian Reservation in Montana.

== Reception ==
Reviewing for The New York Times, Frederick Busch wrote "there is not enough structure to carry the dreams and tales that Mr. Alexie needs to portray and that we need to read. His talent may be for the short form. But the talent is real, and it is very large, and I will gratefully read whatever he writes, in whatever form." Verlyn Klinkenborg, writing for the Los Angeles Times noted "Alexie has been called a lyrical writer, but to call him that is to miss how deadpan he really is, how much his humor depends on saying what hurts in a matter-of-fact voice."

=== Awards ===
Reservation Blues was awarded an American Book Award (by the Before Columbus Foundation) and the Murray Morgan Prize.
