= The Business of Fancydancing =

- DVD cover
- Directed by: Sherman Alexie
- Written by: Sherman Alexie
- Produced by: Larry Estes; Scott Rosenfelt
- Starring: Evan Adams; Michelle St. John; Gene Tagaban; Swil Kanim; Rebecca Carroll
- Cinematography: Holly Taylor
- Edited by: Holly Taylor
- Music by: Brent Michael Davids
- Distributed by: Outrider Pictures
- Release date: 2002
- Running time: 103 min.
- Country: United States
- Language: English
- Box office: $188,887

The Business of Fancydancing is a 2002 film written and directed by Sherman Alexie. It is loosely based on his 1992 book of the same name, a collection of stories and poems.

== Plot ==
The film explores the tension between two Spokane men who grew up together on the Spokane Reservation in eastern Washington state: Seymour Polatkin (Evan Adams) and Aristotle (Gene Tagaban). Seymour's internal conflict between his Indian heritage and his life as an urban gay man with a white boyfriend plays out in multiple cultures and relationships over his college and early adult years. His literary success as a famed American Indian poet, resulting in accolades from non-Indians, contrasts with a lack of approval from those he grew up with back on the reservation. The protagonist struggles with discomfort and alienation in both worlds.

Seymour returns to the reservation for the funeral of his friend Mouse (Swil Kanim), a violinist, and Seymour's internal conflict becomes external as his childhood friends and relatives on the reservation question his motivation for writing Indian-themed poems and selling them to the mainstream public. The film examines several issues that contemporary American Indians face, including cultural assimilation (both on the reservation and in urban areas), difficult stereotypes, and substance abuse.

== Cast ==
- Evan Adams as Seymour Polatkin
- Michelle St. John as Agnes Roth
- Gene Tagaban as Aristotle Joseph
- Swil Kanim as Mouse
- Rebecca Carroll as The Interviewer
- Cynthia Geary as Teresa
- Leo Rossi as Mr. Williams
- Kevin Phillip as Steven
- Elaine Miles as Kim
- Arthur Tulee as Junior One
- Jim Boyd as Junior Two
- Jennifer Elizabeth Kreisberg (billed as Jennifer Kreisberg) as Salmon Girl
- Ron Otis as White Motorist
- William Joseph Elk III as Tavern Father

== Notes ==
There is also a book with the title The Business of Fancydancing: Stories and Poems (1992) which was well received, selling over 10,000 copies.

In the DVD commentary, Alexie refers to Michelle St. John's character, 'Agnes Roth', a mixed-race (Spokane/Jewish) woman who moves to the reservation to teach in the school, as "the moral center of the film". Agnes is also an ex-lover of Polatkin's, with the two of them still maintaining a deep friendship.

The film's incidental music was composed by Mohican composer Brent Michael Davids. The violin solos were composed and performed by Swil Kanim, and a number of the actors sing. The film also features Alexie's poetry, and the author's mother served as a language consultant.

The film was made in an experimental and largely non-hierarchical manner, with a predominantly female crew; many scenes were improvised, with biographical details from the lives of the actors as well as the writer/director. This is discussed in detail on the DVD commentary and the behind the scenes documentary included in the DVD release, where Alexie comments that he wanted to make a film that not only discussed his politics, but put them into practice in the making of the film.

== See also ==
- Fancy dance
- List of American films of 2002
- Sherman Alexie
- Smoke Signals
