= Elaine Miles =

Native American actress from Oregon

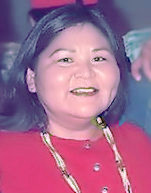
- Miles in 2001
- Born: April 7, 1960 (age 66); Pendleton, Oregon, U.S.
- Occupation: Actress
- Years active: 1990–present
- Children: 1

Elaine Miles (born April 7, 1960) is a Native American actress best known for her role as Marilyn Whirlwind in the television series Northern Exposure. She is an enrolled citizen of the Confederated Tribes of the Umatilla Indian Reservation.

== Early life ==
Elaine Miles was born in Pendleton, Oregon. She is a citizen of the Confederated Tribes of the Umatilla Indian Reservation with Cayuse/Nez Perce ancestry. She lived on the Umatilla Indian Reservation in Eastern Oregon until age three. Her family then moved to Renton, Washington, where her father was a Boeing machinist.

She learned skills and Indigenous art techniques in her youth, such as storytelling, beading, pottery and weaving, and she is a prize-winning powwow dancer.

== Career ==
Miles was offered the role of Marilyn Whirlwind when she was spotted in the waiting room at an audition. This came as a surprise as she had not come with any intent to audition—she was only there to give her mother, Armenia Miles, a ride.

In 1995, Miles was nominated for a Screen Actors Guild Award as part of the Northern Exposure cast in the category, Outstanding Performance by an Ensemble in a Comedy Series.

Since Northern Exposure, Miles has done tours with her dancing and stand-up comedy, has emceed at numerous powwows, and had roles in independent films such as Smoke Signals, Skins and The Business of Fancydancing. With fellow comedian Drew LaCapa (Apache), she has made an exercise video ("RezRobics") addressing diabetes rates among Native Americans. The video mixes powwow dancing, martial arts, and aerobics moves with nutritional advice. In contrast to the usual FBI warning, the creators encourage people to copy the video freely and distribute it among friends and relatives in Indian Country.

== Detention ==
In November 2025, Miles alleged that while waiting for a bus with her son and uncle in Redmond, Washington, she was detained by ICE federal agents who claimed her tribal identification card was "fake". The agents left after she attempted to call the tribal enrollment office. Tricia McLaughlin, the Department of Homeland Security Assistant Secretary, denied that Miles's tribal ID was considered fake.

== Filmography ==
Year	Title	Role	Notes
1990–1995	Northern Exposure	Marilyn Whirlwind	TV series, 110 episodes
1994	Bill Nye, the Science Guy	self	documentary, TV series, 2 episodes
1995	Mad Love	Housekeeper	feature film
1996	The Rez	Mad Etta	TV series, 18 episodes
1996	Pandora's Clock	Housekeeper	TV mini-series, 2 of 2 episodes
1998	Scattering Dad		TV movie
1998	Smoke Signals	Lucy	feature film
2002	The Business of Fancydancing	Kim	feature film
2002	Skins	Rondella Roubaix	feature film
2003	Images of Indians: How Hollywood Stereotyped the Native American	self, archive footage	documentary, TV movie
2007	Tortilla Heaven	Caridad	feature film
2008	Fry Bread Babes	self	documentary, short film
2009	Wyvern	Deputy Barnes	TV movie
2012	Universal VIP	N'ah	short film
2012	By the Salish Sea	Salish Woman	voice, short film
2014	Four Quarters	Mrs. Burke	feature film
2015	Fishing Naked	Louise 'Grandma' Ottertale	feature film
2019	Juanita	Mountain	feature film
2023	The Last of Us	Florence	Episode: "Kin"
