= To Grandmother's House We Go =

1992 Christmas television film directed by Jeff Franklin

- DVD cover
- Genre: Adventure; Comedy; Family
- Written by: Jeff Franklin; Boyd Hale
- Directed by: Jeff Franklin
- Starring: Mary-Kate Olsen; Ashley Olsen
- Composer: Richard Bellis
- Country of origin: United States
- Original language: English

Production
- Executive producers: Allen S. Epstein; Jeff Franklin; Jim Green
- Producer: Mark Bacino
- Production locations: Vancouver, Canada
- Cinematography: Richard Leiterman
- Editor: Bill Petty
- Running time: 96 minutes
- Production companies: Jeff Franklin Productions; Green/Epstein Productions; Lorimar Television

Original release
- Network: ABC
- Release: December 6, 1992

To Grandmother's House We Go is a 1992 American made-for-television Christmas film directed by Jeff Franklin and starring Mary-Kate and Ashley Olsen. The film's title comes from a part of one of the first lines of Lydia Maria Child's Thanksgiving song "Over the River and Through the Wood". It premiered on ABC on December 6, 1992 as a star vehicle for the Olsens, who were starring in Franklin's Full House at the time, and marked their first appearance as separate characters.

== Plot ==
5-year-old twins Sarah and Julie are sweet but naughty, to the frustration of their single mother, Rhonda. After overhearing her say she needs a break from them, they decide to run away to great-grandmother's house in Edgemont for Christmas.

The girls sneak onto a city bus, but learn that it only goes downtown, and that Edgemont is three hours away. After getting off the bus downtown, Sarah and Julie spot Eddie, a delivery man who has a crush on their mom and a love for cowboys. They sneak into the back of his truck for a ride, but are quickly discovered. Although Eddie generally dislikes children, he warms up to the charming girls over time, eventually buying a lottery ticket with the girls' birthdate for the numbers.

Meanwhile, their babysitter has noticed the girls are missing and informs Rhonda, who rushes home and calls the police. Eddie calls and explains that he has the girls, promising to bring them back at the end of the day. Eddie drives the girls home, but the truck is stolen with the girls inside before they can be reunited with their mother.

When the thieves, Harvey and Shirley, discover the girls, they decide they can make some money by holding them for ransom. They convince the girls they are taking them to their grandmother's house, so they will cooperate. Shirley calls Rhonda and asks for $10,000 in cash. She says they will make the trade at the ice rink in Edgemont, and that Rhonda is to wear a red hat. Meanwhile, Harvey has begun to like the girls.

Eddie and Rhonda reluctantly raise the ransom money by pawning the contents of packages which Eddie is supposed to be delivering. Staff at the pawnshops become suspicious and alert the police. Believing they are known criminals Harvey and Shirley, Detective Gremp writes out a warrant for their arrest.

Everyone makes it to the skating rink in Edgemont, although tensions are rising between both couples. When Harvey reveals that they are not going to their grandmother's house, the twins run off. They encounter the park's Santa Claus, who has two horses and carriage made up to look like reindeers and Santa's sleigh. The twins race off in the carriage, still trying to reach their grandmother's house. The horses gallop towards a steep ravine, and Eddie is forced to use his cowboy skills to rescue the girls. Unbeknownst to Eddie and the girls, they have actually stopped right outside the home of the girls' great-grandmother, Mimi.

Just as everything settles down, Detective Gremp and one of his officials arrives to arrest Eddie and Rhonda, still believing they are the thieves. Although Shirley tries to take the opportunity to flee, Harvey feels bad and confesses everything, and they are arrested.

Gremp agrees to bring Eddie, Rhonda and the girls back to the city with him, so Eddie can be back in time to be able to have a chance at winning the lottery with the ticket he bought. He promises to split what he wins between Rhonda and the girls, and has the girls spin the prize wheel for him. He ends up winning the jackpot. Afterward, they give all the people their parcels back, and everybody is happy spending Christmas together.

== Cast ==
- Ashley Olsen as Julie Thompson
- Mary-Kate Olsen as Sarah Thompson
- Cynthia Geary as Rhonda Thompson, Sarah and Julie's divorced mother
- J. Eddie Peck as Eddie Popko, a package delivery man who has a crush on Rhonda
- Jerry Van Dyke as Harvey, one of the FPD Bandits
- Rhea Perlman as Shirley, one of the FPD Bandits
- Stuart Margolin as Det. Gremp
- Florence Paterson as Great Grandma Mimi
- Venus Terzo as Stacey, the babysitter
- Andrew Wheeler as Policeman
- Rick Poltaruk as Santa
- Walter Marsh as Crotchety Man
- Bob Saget as Win-O-Lotto Lottery Host
- Lori Loughlin as Win-O-Lotto Lottery Hostess
- Lorena Gale as Waitress

Andrea Barber and Candace Cameron cameo as audience members.

== Production ==
To Grandmother's House We Go was filmed in Vancouver, British Columbia, Canada. The production company visited Vancouver in March 1992 to scout locations for the film. Filming was set to begin in May 1992. While filming, the twins had Adria Later as their on-set acting and dialogue coach. To Grandmother's House We Go marked the first time the Olsens had to memorize dialogue, on Full House they would just be fed the lines.

The carnival scenes were filmed in Edgemont Village, a neighborhood in North Vancouver, British Columbia, Canada. It debuted in the United States on December 6, 1992.

== See also ==
- List of Christmas films
