= Indian Killer =

1996 novel by Sherman Alexie

- First edition
- Author: Sherman Alexie
- Language: English
- Publisher: Atlantic Monthly Press
- Publication date: September 1996
- Publication place: United States
- Media type: Print, e-book
- Pages: 420 pp
- ISBN: 0-87113-652-X

Indian Killer is a novel written by Sherman Alexie, featuring a serial killer in the city of Seattle, Washington, who scalps white men. Because of this technique, he is called the "Indian Killer" and rising fear provokes anti-Native American violence and racial hostility.

== Plot ==
A serial killer terrorizes Seattle, hunting and scalping white men. The crimes of the so-called 'Indian Killer' triggers a wave of violence and racial hatred against the city’s Native American population.

John Smith, born Indian and raised by whites, desperately yearns for his lost heritage and seeks his elusive true identity; he also battles the severe mental illness that has plagued him since childhood. He meets Marie, an Indian activist outraged by people like Jack Wilson, a mystery writer who claims to be part Indian. As bigoted radio personality Truck Schultz incites whites to seek revenge, tensions mount and Smith fights to slake the anger that engulfs him.

== Reception ==
Publishers Weekly wrote, "this novel offers abundant evidence of a most promising talent extending its range." The editorial review on Amazon.com said, "Alexie's new novel is a departure in tone from his lyrical and funny earlier work" and that "Alexie layers the story with complications and ancillary characters".

The New York Times wrote, "It's difficult not to make Indian Killer sound unrelievedly grim. It is leavened repeatedly, however, by flashes of sardonic wit, the humor that Indians use to assuage pain”.

Sherman Alexie has said Indian Killer is "a feel-good novel about interracial murder".

== Film version ==
In the 1990s, Alexie planned to direct a film version of Indian Killer, but the film was never made.

== Characters ==
=== Major characters ===
- John Smith
- Marie Polatkin
- Jack Wilson
- Clarence Mather
- Truck Schultz

=== Minor characters ===
- Reggie Polatkin
- Mark Jones
- The Foreman
- Aaron Rogers
- David Rogers
- Olivia Smith
- Daniel Smith
- Erik Clancy
