= Colonization Road (film) =

- Directed by: Michelle St. John
- Written by: Ryan McMahon; Michelle St. John; Jordan O'Connor
- Produced by: Shane Belcourt; Brendan Brady; Jordan O'Connor; Michelle St. John
- Starring: Ryan McMahon
- Cinematography: Shane Belcourt
- Edited by: John Reed Hryszkiewicz; Jordan O'Connor; Darryl Whetung
- Music by: Jordan O'Connor
- Release date: October 23, 2016 (imagineNATIVE)
- Running time: 49 minutes
- Country: Canada

Colonization Road is a Canadian documentary film, directed by Michelle St. John and released in 2016. Hosted by comedian and activist Ryan McMahon and starting in his own hometown of Fort Frances, Ontario, the film explores the impact of Ontario's historic colonization road system, which formed the basis of the province's contemporary highway system, on First Nations people. Some towns and cities in the province still to this day have a street named Colonization Road, and the film led some of them to debate changing their road's name.

The film had a theatrical premiere in October 2016 at the imagineNATIVE Film + Media Arts Festival, before airing on CBC Television's documentary series Firsthand on January 26, 2017. At the 6th Canadian Screen Awards in 2018, it received a nomination for the Donald Brittain Award for Best Social or Political Documentary Program.
