= Flight (novel) =

2007 novel by Sherman Alexie

- First edition
- Author: Sherman Alexie
- Cover artist: Charles Rue Woods
- Language: English
- Genre: Historical Fiction
- Publisher: Grove Press
- Publication date: March 28, 2007
- Publication place: United States
- Media type: Print (hardback & paperback)
- Pages: 181
- ISBN: 0-8021-7037-4
- OCLC: 77333764
- Dewey Decimal: 813/.54 22
- LC Class: PS3551.L35774 F57 2007

Flight is a 2007 novel written by Sherman Alexie. It is written in the first-person, from the viewpoint of a Native American teenager who calls himself Zits. Zits is a foster child, having spent the majority of his life moving from one negative or abusive family experience to another. After running away from his most recent foster home, he is detained by police and put into jail. While in his cell, he meets a new friend, Justice, who introduces Zits to a new way of thinking. A new ideology of making white people pay for their historic treatment of Native Americans. Justice provides the weapons, sending Zits on a mass shooting in a downtown Seattle bank. Shot in the back of the head by security, Zits is suddenly transported to the past and thrust into the body of a stranger; this is the first of many similar incidents. The story confronts Zits' feelings of vulnerability as a misunderstood teenager, an orphan, and as a biracial person with Native American ancestry and how forgiveness across multiple generations is an inside job.

== Plot summary ==
Flight begins with Zits waking up in a new foster home. Not liking his new family, he shoves his foster mom against the wall and runs out the door. Eventually, Officer Dave catches up with him and takes him to jail. While in jail Zits meets Justice, a young white boy who takes Zits under his wing. When Zits is released from jail he finds Justice and they begin their training on how to shoot people. Once Justice believes Zits is ready to commit a real crime, he sends him off to a bank. After opening fire in the lobby, Zits perceives he has been shot in the head, ultimately sending him back in time.

During his flashback, Zits transforms into many different historical characters. The first character he transforms into is FBI Agent Hank Storm. While in Hank's body Zits witnesses a meeting with two Indians involved with IRON. He watches his partner kill an innocent Indian and is forced to shoot the corpse in the chest.

The next character he becomes is a mute Indian boy. He is thrown back into the time of General Custer's last stand. He gets to witness this historical battle and at the end is told by his father to slash a fallen soldier's throat as revenge for his own muteness.

While trying to figure out what to do, Zits is taken into yet another character, Gus. Gus is known as "Indian Tracker" and has to lead the cavalry to an Indian camp. Gus is trained to hunt and track down Indians. Trying to take over Gus's actions, Zits forces himself to not attack the Indians. He helps Bow Boy and Small Saint escape from the advancing cavalry.

Next, Zits becomes Jimmy, a pilot who teaches Abbad to fly a plane. He witnesses Jimmy's affair on his wife, and Abbad using the knowledge to carry out a terrorist attack, and Jimmy's suicide.

Finally, Zits ends up like his own father. While in his father's body, he begins to understand why his father left his mother. He also begins to understand that his father does love him and that by leaving he was doing the best for his son.

When Zits reinhabits his own body, he is standing in the bank staring at a small boy. Realizing that his crime could affect many more than just him, he walks out and takes himself to Officer Dave. Knowing he has to help this boy, Officer Dave brings Zits to his brother's house where Zits is offered to stay with them. Zits finally realizes that he can trust these people and for once in his life finally feels at home.

== Characters ==
Zits (Michael), the main character, is fifteen-years-old. For the past nine years of his life, he has been bounced around from negligent family members to remiss foster homes. His Irish-American mother died from breast cancer when he was six years old. Zits’ Native American father left the family when Zits was born. Zits describes himself as "a blank sky, a human solar eclipse," not belonging to anyone and no one belonging to him. After staying with his Aunt and her sexually abusive boyfriend for two years after his mother’s death, Zits runs away, starts drinking, smokes crack, steals a car, and finds himself repeatedly in juvenile detention.

Transformation #1: Hank Storm (FBI Agent) is a short, stocky, attractive, federal agent during the 1975 Indigenous Rights Now! (IRON) movement in Red River, Idaho. Zits is mortified that he is one of the FBI agents who joined with HAMMER, IRON’s opposition. As Hank Storm, Zits learns that Elk and Horse (IRON’s two figureheads) are in cahoots with the FBI and HAMMER. Elk and Horse bring Hank and his partner a member of IRON, Junior, to interrogate. When Hank’s partner, Art, is unable to attain information from Junior, Art shoots and kills him. Hank is forced to shoot Junior as well after he is already dead in order to have his hand in the murder.

Transformation #2: Native American Boy, The Indian boy lives at the camp at Little Big Horn on the eve of Custer's attack. He cannot speak because of damage to his voice box, caused by previous violence. He has a father who loves him very much; this is first time Zits feels love and affection from another person. His father talks to a Native American with peeling skin and lightning bolts painted on his body; Zits realizes this is Crazy Horse, the Oglala war leader. He witnesses the attack and the brutality the Indians inflict on the white man. He is then told to cut the throat of a young white soldier but hesitates wanting to give the boy mercy.

Transformation #3: Native American Tracker, Gus, the Indian tracker, is an old man leading the US Army against Native Americans sometime during the middle of the 19th century. He is arthritic and has trouble moving, and he also has a deep-seated hatred for Native Americans, because as a younger man he came across a white settlement where men, women, and children were killed by Native Americans. However, during the massacre of the Indian village which he helped initiate, he sees one of the young soldiers, whom he calls Small Saint, running off and saving a little Indian boy, someone he starts to refer to as Bow Boy. He is supposed to turn them over but instead helps them get away because the young man joined the military to help people.

Transformation #4: Pilot (Jimmy), Jimmy is a middle-aged white pilot and flying instructor. He has been married to Linda for twenty years, although he is having a thirteen-month affair with Helda. His best friend of fifteen years is Abbad, an Ethiopian Muslim and an immigrant, whom he taught how to fly. After Abbad hijacks and crashes a plane into downtown Chicago, Jimmy feels a number of emotions, mostly betrayal. When Linda sees Jimmy with Helda, Jimmy takes his plane and crashes it into a lake, committing suicide.

Transformation #5: Zits' Father, Zits' father is a homeless Native American on the streets of Tacoma. As his father, Zits learns that his father endured physical and emotional abuse as a child; after failing to kill an animal on an unsuccessful hunt, Zits' Grandfather forces his son to repeat the lines "I ain't worth shit" over and over again. Haunted by this memory outside the room where Zits is being born, Zits' father runs away and abandons his son. He carries a photo of five-year-old Zits with him at all times.

Justice is an intelligent, good-looking white kid of seventeen that Zits meets in jail. He displays an interest in Native American history and in the recurring violence in American culture. Justice gives Zits a paintball gun and a real gun and convinces Zits to shoot up a bank in after effort to start a contemporary Ghost Dance. With no real record of Justice being in the prison system, it is unclear whether or not Justice is a doppelgänger/opposite of Zits.

Officer Dave is a city cop in Seattle, WA. He has arrested Zits a number of times and he has always showed compassion for him. He is Robert's brother and played a huge part in Zits' adoption.

Robert is Zits's adoptive father and Officer Dave's brother. He works as a firefighter and takes him in along with his wife Mary. Initially, Zits is reluctant to accept their generosity but he warms up to them when he realizes their compassion for him is genuine. At the end of the book, he even reveals his real name to Mary.

Mary, Dave's sister-in-law, wants to be a mother. She and her husband Robert take Zits in and later adopt him. She is trying her hardest to make Zits feel at home and finally safe.

== Themes ==
Adolescence

Zits progresses through a change in adolescence in Flight. He was a troubled youth constantly getting into trouble. However, after a course of events he begins to change. By the end he is finally ready to accept who he is. He is no longer Zits, misfit boy, he is Michael. And now he finally has a real family. "But I'm beginning to think I've been given a chance. I'm beginning to think I might get unlonely. I'm beginning to think I might have an almost real family...Michael. My real name is Michael. Please call me Michael." Pages 180-181

Violence

"I get into arguments and fistfights with everybody. I get so angry that I go blind and deaf and mute." Page 8. Zits starts off as a very angry and violent individual. He's violent because he's been bounced from one place to another and he takes out his anger on anyone around him. He also is a witness to violence once he begins his "flights." By experiencing the events, which he is unable to change anything, he realizes that the violence had dire consequences. And by realizing how violence affects those around him he realizes that the way he's living is wrong and he's got to change something. Always trying to start things with people has always been fun for him like running away from the police.

Morality

In Flight, the main character, Zits learns the importance of the choices made and the effect they have on self and others. His "flights" and brief experiences through various men in history, allow Zits to experience firsthand the effects of violence, hatred, anger, etc. "I like to start fire. And I’m ashamed that I’m a fire starter. I’m ashamed of everything, and I’m ashamed of being ashamed" (page 8). This shame reveals that in the center of this young Indian boy, change from his lifestyle of destruction, mischief, and hatred is desired and possible. Through these experiences, he learns empathy as he gains the perspectives of others. After returning from his "flights" he stands in a bank with the choice to pull out his gun and begin firing or walk away from the consequences and guilt he would forever face. While processing his unexpected and bizarre adventures, he decisively ponders, "I used to hate the rain. But now I want it to pour. I want it to storm. I want to be clean" (159). He begins to make changes in his life that dramatically change his morality for the good.

Native American

He notices the racism and stigma attached to being a Native American. He also realizes minorities affect views on life, depending on your background. Zits realizes that everyone has different views and ideals that are specific to an ethnic group. Also, just because you belong to a particular ethnic group doesn't mean you know everything either. Zits learned a great deal about his own people when he realized that his own history lied to him. There is always more than one side to a story. "My father was an Indian. From this or that tribe. From this or that reservation. I never knew him..." "I'm Irish and Indian, which would be the coolest blend in the world if my parents were around to teach me how to be Irish and Indian. But they're not here and haven't been for years. So, I'm not really Irish or Indian. I'm a blank sky, a human solar eclipse."

== Critical reception ==
A reviewer for Publishers Weekly wrote: "while the plot is wisp-thin, one quickly surrenders to Zits's voice, which elegantly mixes free-floating young adult cynicism with a charged, idiosyncratic view of American history. Alexie plunges the book into bracing depths."

== Writing style ==
The novel is written from a first-person perspective, in a conversational tone. The author uses humor and abrupt confrontation. For example, in Chapter Seven the narrator says, "I don't mean to be disrespectful, but it smells like the Devil dropped a shit right here in the middle of the camp" (61).

== Historical references ==
The story of Flight refers to historical events in the relations between Native Americans and European Americans with strong emphasis placed on race relations. These vary from the ambiguous mention of a time or place to a specific Indian reservation. The author did not always refer to real events, but sets up parallels that point to historical events.

The character of Hank Storm is an FBI agent in the 1970s, who becomes involved at the Red River reservation, where there is tension between Native Americans who want to embrace traditional ways and FBI agents. Historically there was a major conflict and stand-off between agents of the United States Government and Lakota at the Pine Ridge Indian Reservation. The American Indian Movement (AIM) was an activist group at the time, encouraging Native Americans to draw strength from their own traditions, and emphasizing their rights and sovereignty.

Next Zits is transported back to the day of the Battle of Little Big Horn. This historical battle marked one of the last of the Indian wars, and the one in which Native Americans inflicted the highest rate of casualties against United States forces. The armed engagement lasted from June 25–26 of 1876 and was an overwhelming victory for Lakota and Northern Cheyenne fighters led by Sitting Bull; General Custer led his men to utter defeat.

Zits enters another volatile situation with Gus, a nineteenth-century Indian tracker. In the mid-to-late nineteenth century, the westward expansion of pioneers created a powder keg in the form of crowded Native American tribes and nervous white settlers. This erupted in a series of battles and massacres in numerous states. Flight refers to a retaliatory massacre on the Colorado River. This could refer to the Sand Creek massacre conducted by US forces. It caused outrage and disgust among white Easterners. After Sand Creek, military- sanctioned retaliatory massacres declined and eventually stopped.

Flight also refers to the September 11, 2001 attacks, the first on United States soil since Pearl Harbor in 1941. Members of Al-Qaeda highjacked four planes on suicide attacks, driving them into major buildings, and killing thousands of Americans. As a result of the attack, many Americans became more fearful and suspicious of Muslims. When Zits entered the body of the pilot, Jimmy, he recollects Jimmy's memories of his Muslim friend Abbad. Abbad shares that he suspected Jimmy feared him as a possible terrorist when he expressed interest in learning to fly. He also mentions employers who rejected him prior to Jimmy, because he was Muslim. Jimmy's worst fears, mostly unspoken, are realized when Abbad crashes his plane into a Chicago building.
