= Michelle St. John =

Canadian actor, singer and director

Michelle St. John is a Canadian actress, singer, producer and director who has been involved in creative projects in theatre, film, television and music since the 1980s. She is from the Wampanog Nation. Her directorial debut, Colonization Road, is a 2016 feature-length documentary that premiered at the imagineNATIVE Film and Media Arts Festival.

== Early life ==
St. John is the daughter of musician Wayne St. John and a Jewish mother.

== Career ==
St. John began her career in film as an actress. One of her first roles was as the protagonist in the 1989 CBC film Where the Spirit Lives, for which she won a Gemini Award for Best Actress - Dramatic Program.

She has worked on many television series, including Northern Exposure and By Way of the Stars and she voiced the character of Nakoma in Disney's 1995 animated film Pocahontas.

In 1998, she had a cameo as Velma in Chris Eyre's award-winning Smoke Signals. St. John has produced several short films and theatre productions with Marie Clements. She has collaborated with Shane Belcourt as co-producer on two Heritage Minutes, Chanie Wenjack and Naskumituwin (Treaty) and the independent feature film Red Rover.

In 2016, She came across the inspiration for Colonization Road, which she wrote, produced, and directed, while touring with Turtle Gals in Fort Frances, Ontario.

The World Premiere of Colonization Road was on October 23, 2016, at imagineNATIVE Film and Media Arts Festival, and it was nominated for a 2017 Canadian Screen Award in Donald Brittain Social Political Documentary category. It also received a Golden Sheaf Awards for Best History Documentary.

== Filmography ==
=== Film ===
Year	Title	Role	Notes
1990	Straight Line	Secretary	
1995	Pocahontas	Nakoma (voice)	
1996	Coyote Summer	Rachel	
1998	Smoke Signals	Velma	
1998	Pocahontas II: Journey to a New World	Nakoma (voice)	Video
2002	The Business of Fancydancing	Agnes Roth	
2010	Keeping Quiet	Maureen	Short
2010	Jesus Indian		Short
2010	Every Emotion Costs	Juniper	
2014	Rez Carz	(voice)	Short

=== Television ===
Year	Title	Role	Notes
1986	9B	Emma Kostynuik	TV film
1987	CBS Schoolbreak Special	Maggie	Episode: "The Day They Came to Arrest the Book"
1987	Beverly Hills Teens	Shanelle (voice)	Episode: "Dream Date"
1988	T. and T.	Secretary	Episode: "Straight Line: Part 4"
1988	9B	Emma Kostynuik	Main role
1989	Where the Spirit Lives	Komi / Amelia	TV film
1990	E.N.G.	Merrily Swanson	Episode: "A Long Way from Hopeful"
1991	Conspiracy of Silence	Helen Betty Osborne	TV miniseries
1992	Lost in the Barrens: The Curse of the Viking Grave	Angeline	TV film
1992	Under the Umbrella Tree	Marie Blackbird	Episode: "Everybody's Garden"
1992–93	By Way of the Stars	White Feather	TV miniseries
1993	Liar, Liar: Between Father and Daughter	Janice Wilson	TV film
1993	Northern Exposure	Debbie	Episode: "Love's Labour Mislaid"
1993	Geronimo		TV film
1993	Spirit Rider	Camilla St. Claire	TV film
1995	Side Effects	Iris	Episode: "Lucky Numbers"
1995	Murphy Brown	Volunteer	Episode: "Murphy's Law"
1996	The Adventures of Dudley the Dragon	Catherine	Episode: "Mama Crabby Tree"
1998	White Lies	TV Newsperson 1	TV film
2002	Tipi Tales	Great-grandmother (voice)	TV series
2004	This Is Wonderland	Naomi King	Episode: "1.7"

== Other work ==
Year	Title	Project	Notes
2010	Jesus Indian	Short	Producer
2012	The Language of Love	Documentary short	Producer
2015	Hadwin's Judgement	Documentary	Production coordinator
2016	Urban Native Girl	TV series	Associate producer, researcher, writer, production manager
2016	Heritage Minutes	Episodes: "Naskumituwin (Treaty)", "Chanie Wenjack"	Co-producer
2016	Colonization Road	Documentary	Producer, writer, director, camera operator
2017	CBC Docs POV	Episode: "The Crimes of Shelly Chartier"	Researcher
2017	The Road Forward	Documentary	Performer: "1965"
2018	Red Rover	Feature	Associate producer, production manager
2019	Merchants of the Wild	TV series documentary	Associate producer, location manager

== Awards ==
- 1990 - Gemini Award: Best Actress - Dramatic Program (Where the Spirit Lives)
- 1992 - Gemini Award: Best Guest Performance in a Series by an Actor or Actress (E.N.G. Season 2, Episode 11)
- 2003 - FAITA Award: Outstanding Performance by an Actress in a Film (The Business of Fancydancing)
- 2011 - American Indian Movie Award: Best Actress (Every Emotion Costs)
