= War Dances =

2009 collection of short stories and poems by Sherman Alexie

- First edition (publ. Grove Press)
- Author: Sherman Alexie
- Language: English
- Publication date: 2009

War Dances is a 2009 collection of short stories and poems by Sherman Alexie. It received the 2010 PEN/Faulkner Award for Fiction.

== Contents ==
War Dances collects twenty-three short pieces, alternating between poems and short works of fiction. The poems are as follows:

- "The Limited"
- "Go, Ghost, Go"
- "After Building the Lego Star Wars Ultimate Death Star"
- "The Theology of Reptiles"
- "Ode to Small-town Sweethearts"
- "Another Proclamation"
- "Home of the Braves"
- "On Airplanes"
- "Ode for Pay Phones"
- "Looking Glass"
- "Food Chain"

The short fiction pieces—which vary between short stories, vignettes, flash fiction, imagined dialogue, et al.—are as follows:

- Breaking and Entering
- Bird-watching at Night
- War Dances
- Catechism
- The Senator's Son
- Invisible Dog on a Leash
- The Ballad of Paul Nonetheless
- Big Bang Theory
- Roman Catholic Haiku
- Salt

== Other Publications ==
The titular short story, "War Dances," was also published in the New Yorker in 2009.

== Reception ==
In the press release announcing War Dances as the winner of the PEN/Faulker prize, Judge Al Young said, "War Dances taps every vein and nerve, every tissue, every issue that quickens the current blood-pulse: parenthood, divorce, broken links, sex, gender and racial conflict, substance abuse, medical neglect, 9/11, Official Narrative vs. What Really Happened, settler religion vs. native spirituality; marketing, shopping, and war, war, war. All the heartbreaking ways we don't live now - this is the caring, eye-opening beauty of this rollicking, bittersweet gem of a book."

SUNY-New Palz assigned War Dances as its 2011 College’s Common Summer Reading Program, paired with another work by Alexie, The Absolutely True Diary of a Part-Time Indian.
