= Evan Adams =

Actor, playwright, medical doctor

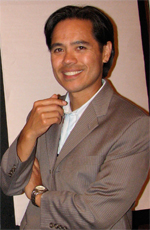
- Born: Evan Tlesla Adams; November 15, 1966 (age 59); Sliammon First Nation, British Columbia, Canada
- Education: University of Calgary
- Occupations: Actor, playwright, Doctor
- Years active: 1986–present
- Website: www.drevanadams.ca

Evan Tlesla Adams (born November 15, 1966) is an Indigenous Canadian actor, playwright, and physician. A Coast Salish from the Tla'amin First Nation near Powell River, British Columbia, he is best known internationally for his roles in the films of Sherman Alexie, as Thomas Builds-the-Fire in the 1998 film Smoke Signals and Seymour Polatkin in the 2002 film The Business of Fancydancing.

== Career ==
=== Entertainment ===
He won an Independent Spirit Award in 1999 for Best Debut Performance for his role in Smoke Signals, and a Los Angeles Outfest award in 2002 for his role in Fancy dancing.

In Canada, Adams has acted primarily in television, including roles in The Beachcombers, "Lost in the Barrens" Da Vinci's Inquest, Neon Rider, These Arms of Mine, Da Vinci's City Hall, The L Word, and Wolf Canyon, and stage roles in Lear and Dry Lips Oughta Move to Kapuskasing. He appeared in the 1990 made-for-TV movie "Lost in the Barrens". He also appeared in the documentary film Just Watch Me: Trudeau and the '70s Generation, speaking about his own experience as a young, gay, First Nations man growing up in Canada during the Pierre Trudeau era.

His plays, including Dreams of Sheep, Snapshots, Dirty Dog River and Janice's Christmas, have been produced across Canada and internationally.

He appears in the 2017 films Indian Horse and Kayak to Klemtu, and the 2020 film Indian Road Trip.

In 2023, he made a guest appearance as Larry, the Indian Health Service psychologist, on the series Reservation Dogs. He also played adult Tim Wallach in the television miniseries Bones of Crows.

=== Medical ===
Adams has also worked extensively with First Nations health programs in Canada, including HIV/AIDS education and alcohol and drug abuse treatment. In 2002, Adams completed a medical degree at the University of Calgary. He completed his residency at St. Paul's Hospital/UBC (as chief resident), and also earned a Masters of Public Health degree from Johns Hopkins University. In April 2007, Adams was appointed the first-ever Aboriginal Health Physician Advisor for the province of British Columbia. In April 2012, Adams was made Deputy Provincial Health Officer for British Columbia by Dr. Perry Kendall. On December 1, 2014, Adams became the Chief Medical Officer of the First Nations Health Authority in British Columbia.
