= Alexander Kuo =

American writer (1939–2025)

Alexander Kuo (January 19, 1939 – June 11, 2025) was an American teacher, poet, fiction writer, and essayist. He was a Professor of English at Washington State University, and retired in 2012. He has taught in numerous academic institutions in China, including Beijing and Changchun universities. In 2002 he won an American Book Award for his Lipstick and Other Stories of the Before Columbus Foundation.

== Early life and education ==
Alexander Kuo was born in Boston, Massachusetts, where his father Zing-Yang Kuo, a visiting Chinese scientist, was doing research at the Carnegie Nutrition Laboratory. His mother, Lin Qui Fang, was also a scientist. His parents returned to China in 1939, when he was 9 months old. He lived in Chongqing and Shanghai until 1947, when his family moved to Hong Kong. In 1956 he came to the United States to continue his education. He received his B.A. from Knox College in Illinois in 1961, where he studied with Sam Moon and Gogisgi. He earned an M.F.A. from the University of Iowa, where he studied in the Iowa Writer's Workshop with Donald Justice and Philip Roth.

The book Erased, by his fourth wife Joan Burbick, is a near-fictional novel outlining Alex Kuo's early childhood and mother Lin Qui.

== Career ==
Kuo was a professor of English at Washington State University (WSU), which lists him as an example of their "world class faculty." He is the former chair of the Department of Comparative American Cultures (now called Comparative Ethnic Studies). In 2001, WSU named him as their first Writer-in-Residence.

Kuo has been a mentor to Sherman Alexie, a notable Native American writer.

Kuo died on June 11, 2025, at the age of 86.

== Honors ==
- Kuo has won multiple National Endowment for the Arts grants.
- He has held numerous teaching fellowships in China, including a 1989 fellowship at Beijing University, Senior Fulbright Scholar at Changchun University in 1991-92, and a Lingnan Fellow in Hong Kong in 1997-98.
- He has held positions at numerous universities in China including Peking University, Beijing Forestry University, Jilin University, and Hong Kong Baptist University.
- In 2002-03, Kuo was Writer-in-Residence with the Mercy Corps.
- 2003-2004, he received a Rockefeller Foundation grant for a Bellagio residency in Italy.
- 2002, Lipstick and Other Stories won the American Book Award of the Before Columbus Foundation.

== Writing ==
Reviewer Robert H. Abel said in 2001 that Kuo's writing makes demands on the reader in a way comparable to Franz Kafka or Jorge Luis Borges.

== Works ==
=== Poetry ===
- The Window Tree (1974)
- New Letters from Hiroshima, and Other Poems (1974)
- Changing the River (1986)
- This Fierce Geography (1998)
- A Chinaman’s Chance: New and Selected Poems 1960-2010 (2011)
- Meeting Words at the Gate (Bilingual English/Chinese, 2015)

=== Fiction ===
- Chinese Opera (novel, 1998)
- Lipstick and Other Stories (short stories, 2001)
- Panda Diaries (novel, 2006)
- White Jade and Other Stories (short stories, 2008)
- The Man Who Dammed the Yangtze: A Mathematical Novel (novel, 2011)
- shanghai.shanghai.shanghai (novel, 2015)
- Mao’s Kisses: A Novel of June 4, 1989 (novel, 2019)

=== Nonfiction ===
- My Private China, (2013)
