= Switchmas =

2012 holiday comedy movie

- Film poster
- Directed by: Sue Corcoran
- Written by: Douglas Horn; Angie Louise; Sue Corcoran
- Produced by: Jane Charles; Sue Corcoran; Jennifer Reibman
- Starring: Elliott Gould; David DeLuise
- Cinematography: Mark Simon
- Edited by: Cindy Sangster
- Music by: Bruce Monroe
- Production company: Von Piglet Productions
- Release date: November 1, 2012
- Running time: 100 minutes
- Country: United States
- Language: English

Switchmas (earlier titles Ira Finkelstein's Christmas and All I Want Is Christmas) is an American musical comedy film directed by Sue Corcoran. It tells the story of a Christmas-obsessed Jewish boy on his way to sunny Florida who figures out how to get the Christmas of his dreams by trading airline tickets and places with another boy on his way to snowy Christmastown, Washington. This film also features CGI scenes depicting the boy's Christmas dreams.

It stars Elliott Gould and David DeLuise and is directed and produced by Sue Corcoran.

It was originally filmed in Leavenworth, Washington, under the title Ira Finkelstein's Christmas. At a local screening in 2012 it had the title All I Want Is Christmas.

The film was included in the 2012 Seattle International Film Festival.

== Plot ==
In Hollywood, Ira J. Finkelstein (Elijah Nelson) wishes he could celebrate Christmas, but his parents do not want to celebrate because they are Jewish. Ira's father, Max (David DeLuise), a filmmaker, says he's making a low-budget, holiday sci-fi movie and that he wants demanding and empty-headed Jennifer Cameo (Julianne Christie) to be the lead role. Ira's mother, Rosie (Angela DiMarco), a caterer, gets to plan a Christmas party. Ira's parents tell him that he is going to visit his grandparents, Sam (Elliott Gould) and Ruth Finkelstein (Meg Savlov) in Florida for Hanukkah and that he'll have fun with them. Ira further contends that he wants to go somewhere where it snows so that he can experience an authentic Christmas.

Ira's flight lands at the Chicago O'Hare International Airport and he is excited to see snow for the first time in real life. At an indoor kids' area he reluctantly goes over to the play area where he meets a Christian boy named Mikey Amato (Justin Howell). Mikey tells Ira that he is from Chicago and is visiting his aunt, uncle, and cousins in Washington, relatives that he hardly knows; he only knows their names and what they look like by a postcard his mom, Julie (Tracy Hyland), gave him. He also thinks it's awesome how Jews get eight nights of presents for Hanukkah. Ira tells him that he'd rather go to a place like Washington to experience Christmas. They agree to switch places, donning each other's hats, coats, and ID tags as well as Ira’s glasses but the two boys barely pull it off due to Ira's bad eye prescription... with no airport security guard suspecting anything different about them. Ira and Mikey exchange phone numbers while Mikey gives Ira the postcard of his cousins.

Ira arrives at the Seattle–Tacoma International Airport and is greeted by Mikey's relatives, Libby (Cynthia Geary) and Walt (Tony Doupe) Wilson and their three children, Jessica (Jenna Levin), Clare (Shayne Hodgins), and Kyle (Jack Fleischmann). Meanwhile, Mikey arrives in Florida and is affectionately greeted by Ira's grandparents. Neither set of relatives suspects anything is wrong since Mikey and Ira look alike, nor have they seen them since they were both much younger.

The Wilsons take their "cousin" to Christmastown, Washington, where they live. Ira is excited because the town is "just like in the movies". He is also inspired to make and direct a play called Christmas Is For Everyone. Jessica and her friend Spike sing and play guitar on the street for money, and Clare can sing but doesn't want to do it in public. She writes a song for the play, and Jessica and Spike agree to perform in the play. Clare and Ira round up kids from town to audition.

Jack, a bully, sics his dog Killer on Ira, who climbs a tree to escape the dog. Eventually, Ira realizes he misses his family. After Jack's father threatens to send Killer to the pound, Clare and Ira rescue Killer, renamed Mistletoe, and put him in the play.

Mikey suffers a broken arm, and when Ira's parents are called, they drop everything to rush to his side... discovering that he and Ira had switched places; Jennifer was becoming too difficult to work with and wasn't talented anyway. The truth eventually comes out to everyone but Ira's family go to Washington to surprise him on the night of the play. Mikey's family also finds out the truth, and Mikey is pleased to see his mother, who came to surprise him as well. As the play comes to an end, Ira's parents reconcile with him and tell him that they're very proud of what he's done. Soon everyone gathers for the final song:, "Christmas Is For Everyone", and they embrace each other as they learn the true meaning of family and the holidays.

== Cast ==
- Elliott Gould as Sam Finkelstein
- David DeLuise as Max Finkelstein
- Elijah Nelson as Ira J. Finkelstein
- Justin Howell as Mikey Amato
- Cynthia Geary as Libby Wilson
- Angela DiMarco as Rosie Finkelstein
- Shaye Hodgins as Clare
- Julianne Christie as Jennifer Cameo
- Jenna Levin as Jessica Wilson
- Meg Savlov as Ruth Finkelstein
- Tony Doupe as Walt Wilson
- Jack Fleischmann as Kyle
- Lance Rosen as Sol
- Ashton Herrild as Jack The Jerk
- Tracy Hyland as Julie

== See also ==
- List of Christmas films
