= Sherman Alexie =

Native American author and filmmaker (born 1966)

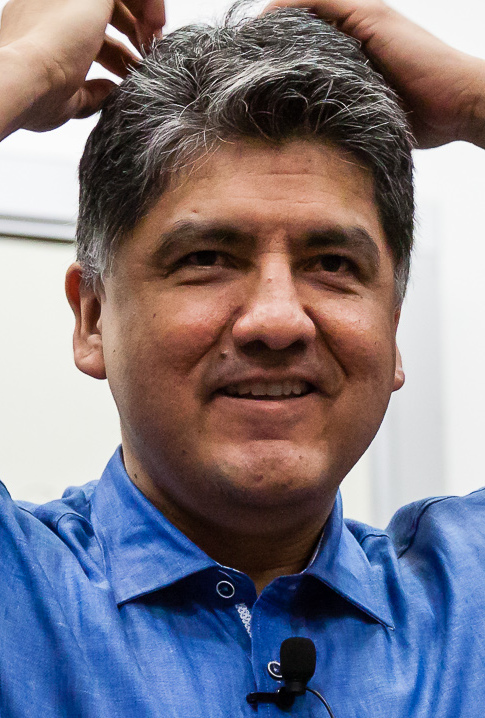
- Alexie in 2016
- Born: October 7, 1966 (age 60); Spokane, Washington, U.S.
- Occupations: Author; poet; screenwriter; filmmaker
- Writing career
- Genres: Native American literature, humor, documentary fiction
- Notable works: • The Absolutely True Diary of a Part-Time Indian • Smoke Signals • Reservation Blues • The Lone Ranger and Tonto Fistfight in Heaven • You Don't Have to Say You Love Me: A Memoir • War Dances
- Notable awards: American Book Award; 1996 National Book Award; 2007 PEN/Faulkner; 2010
- Movement: Indigenous Nationalism
- Website: fallsapart.com

Sherman Joseph Alexie Jr. (born October 7, 1966) is a Spokane novelist, short story writer, poet, screenwriter, and filmmaker. His writings draw on his experiences as an Indigenous American with ancestry from several tribes. Alexie grew up on the Spokane Indian Reservation and now lives in Seattle, Washington.

His best-known book is the semi-autobiographical young adult novel, The Absolutely True Diary of a Part-Time Indian (2007), which won the 2007 U.S. National Book Award for Young People's Literature and the Odyssey Award as best 2008 audiobook for young people (read by Alexie). Alexie also wrote The Lone Ranger and Tonto Fistfight in Heaven (1993), a collection of short stories, which was adapted as the film Smoke Signals (1998), for which he also wrote the screenplay. Alexie's first novel, Reservation Blues, received a 1996 American Book Award. His 2009 collection of short stories and poems, War Dances, won the 2010 PEN/Faulkner Award for Fiction.

== Early life ==
Sherman Joseph Alexie Jr. was born on October 7, 1966, at Sacred Heart Hospital in Spokane, Washington. He is a citizen of the Spokane Tribe of the Spokane Reservation and grew up on the Spokane Indian Reservation. Alexie's father, Sherman Sr., was a citizen of the Coeur D'Alene Tribe, and his mother, Lillian Agnes Cox, was of Spokane, Colville, Choctaw, and European American ancestry. One of his paternal great-grandfathers was of Russian descent.

Alexie was born with hydrocephalus, a condition that occurs when there is an abnormally large amount of cerebral fluid in the brain's ventricular system. He had to have brain surgery at the age of six months and was at high risk of death or mental disabilities if he survived. Alexie's surgery was successful; he did not experience mental damage but had other side effects.

His parents were alcoholics, though his mother achieved sobriety while his father often left the house on drinking binges for days at a time. To support her six children, Alexie's mother, Lillian, sewed quilts, served as a clerk at the Wellpinit Trading Post, and worked other jobs as well.

Alexie has described his life at the reservation school as challenging, as he was constantly teased by other kids and endured abuse he described as "torture" from white nuns who taught there. They called Alexie "The Globe" because his head was larger than usual, due to his hydrocephalus as an infant. Until age seven, Alexie had seizures and bedwetting; he had to take strong drugs to control them. Because of his health problems, Alexie was excluded from many of the activities that are rites of passage for young Indian males. Alexie excelled academically, reading everything available, including auto repair manuals.

== Education ==
In order to improve his education, Alexie decided to leave the reservation and attend high school, where he was the only Native American student, 22 miles (35 km) from the reservation in Reardan, Washington. Alexie excelled at his studies and became a star player on the basketball team, the Reardan High School Indians. He was elected class president and was a member of the debate team.

Alexie's successes in high school won him a scholarship in 1985 to Gonzaga University, a Jesuit university in Spokane. Originally, Alexie enrolled in the pre-medical program with hopes of becoming a doctor, but found that he was squeamish during dissection in his anatomy classes. Alexie switched to law, but found that was not suitable either. He felt enormous pressure to succeed in college, and consequently, Alexie began drinking heavily to cope with his anxiety. Unhappy with law, Alexie found comfort in literature classes.

In 1987, Alexie dropped out of Gonzaga and enrolled in Washington State University (WSU), where he took a creative writing course taught by Alex Kuo, a respected poet of Chinese-American background. Alexie was at a low point in his life, and Kuo served as a mentor to him. Kuo gave Alexie an anthology entitled Songs of This Earth on Turtle's Back, by Joseph Bruchac. Alexie was inspired by reading works of poetry written by Native Americans.

== Sexual harassment allegations ==
On February 28, 2018, Alexie published a statement regarding accusations of sexual harassment against him by several women, to which Alexie responded: "Over the years, I have done things that have harmed other people", and apologized, while also admitting to having had an affair with author Litsa Dremousis, one of the accusers, whose specific charges he repudiated. Dremousis said that "she'd had an affair with Alexie, but had remained friends with him until the stories about his sexual behavior surfaced". She claimed that numerous women had spoken to her about Alexie's behavior. Dremousis' response initially appeared on her Facebook page and was subsequently reprinted in The Stranger on March 1, 2018. The allegations against Alexie were detailed in an NPR story five days later.

The fallout from these accusations includes the Institute of American Indian Arts renaming its Sherman Alexie Scholarship as the MFA Alumni Scholarship. The blog Native Americans in Children's Literature has deleted or modified all references to Alexie. In February 2018, it was reported that the American Library Association, which had just awarded Alexie its Carnegie Medal for You Don't Have to Say You Love Me: A Memoir, was reconsidering, and in March it was confirmed that Alexie had declined the award and was postponing the publication of a paperback version of the memoir. The American Indian Library Association rescinded its 2008 Best Young Adult Book Award from Alexie for The Absolutely True Diary of a Part-Time Indian, "to send an unequivocal message that Alexie's actions are unacceptable."

== Career ==
In 1992, Alexie published his first collection of poetry, The Business of Fancydancing: Stories and Poems through Hanging Loose Press. With that success, Alexie stopped drinking and quit school just three credits short of a degree. However, in 1995, he was awarded an honorary bachelor's degree from Washington State University.

In 2005, Alexie became a founding board member of Longhouse Media, a non-profit organization that is committed to teaching filmmaking skills to Native American youth and using media for cultural expression and social change. Alexie has long supported youth programs and initiatives dedicated to supporting at-risk Native youth.

=== Literary works ===
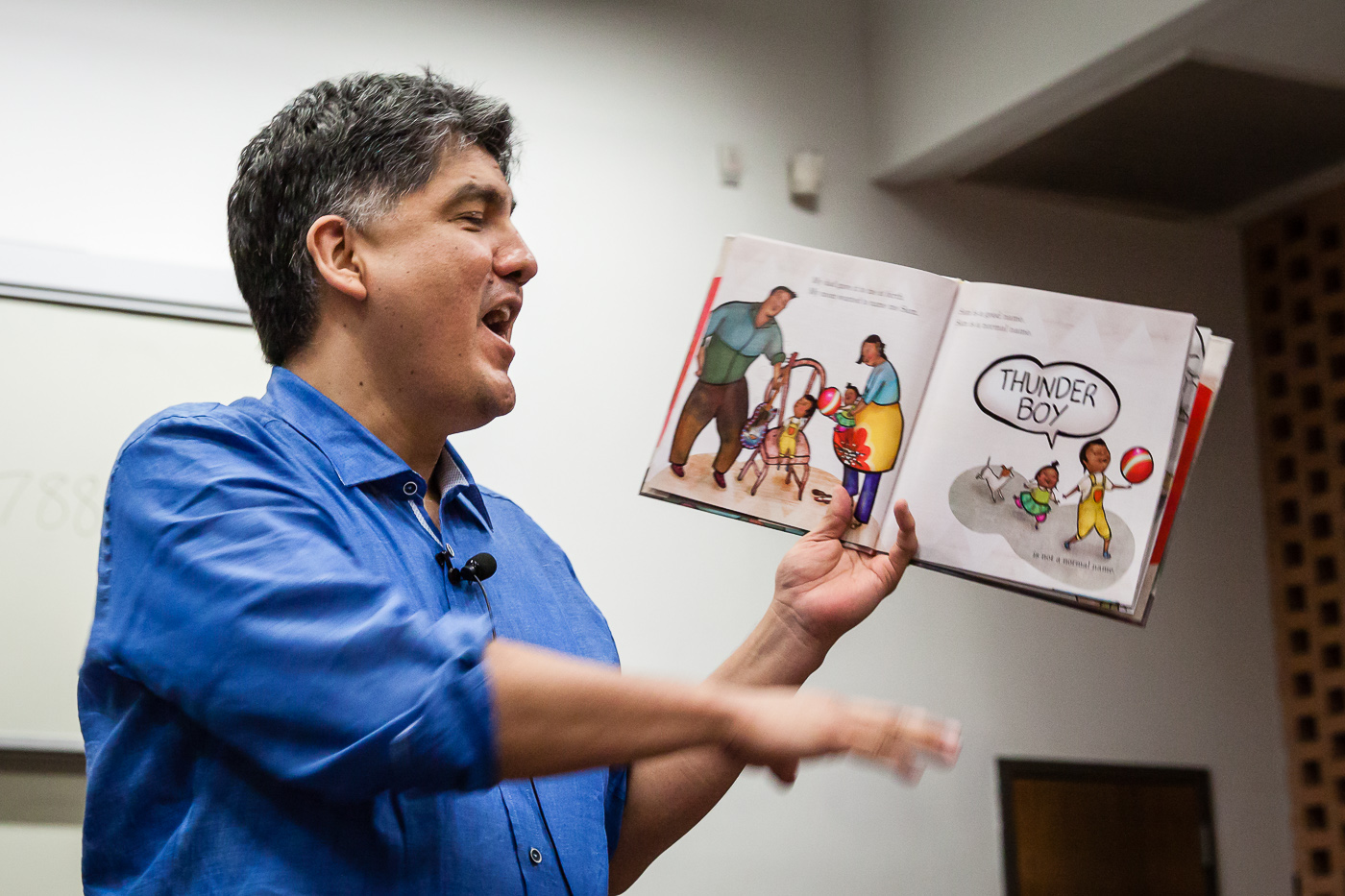
Alexie reading at the launch of RED INK: International Journal of Indigenous Literature, Art, and Humanities at Arizona State University in 2016

Alexie's stories have been included in several short story anthologies, including The Best American Short Stories 2004, edited by Lorrie Moore; and Pushcart Prize XXIX of the Small Presses. Additionally, a number of his pieces have been published in various literary magazines and journals, as well as online publications.

=== Themes ===
Alexie's poetry, short stories, and novels explore themes of despair, poverty, violence, and alcoholism in the lives of Native American people, both on and off the reservation. They are lightened by wit and humor. According to Sarah A. Quirk from the Dictionary of Library Biography, Alexie asks three questions across all of his works: "What does it mean to live as an Indian in this time? What does it mean to be an Indian man? Finally, what does it mean to live on an Indian reservation?" The protagonists in most of his literary works exhibit a constant struggle with themselves and their own sense of powerlessness in white American society.

=== Poetry ===
Within a year of graduating from college, Alexie received the Washington State Arts Commission Poetry Fellowship and the National Endowment for the Arts Poetry Fellowship. His career began with the publishing of his first two collections of poetry in 1992, entitled, I Would Steal Horses and The Business of Fancydancing. In these poems, Alexie uses humor to express the struggles of contemporary Indians on reservations. Common themes include alcoholism, poverty, and racism. Although he uses humor to express his feelings, the underlying message is very serious. Alexie was awarded The Chad Walsh Poetry Prize by the Beloit Poetry Journal in 1995.

The Business of Fancydancing: Stories and Poems (1992) was well received, selling over 10,000 copies. Alexie refers to his writing as "fancydancing," a flashy, colorful style of competitive powwow dancing. Whereas older forms of Indian dance may be ceremonial and kept private among tribal members, the fancy dance style was created for public entertainment. Alexie compares the mental, emotional, and spiritual outlet that he finds in his writings to the vivid self-expression of the dancers. Leslie Ullman commented on The Business of Fancydancing in the Kenyon Review, writing that Alexie "weaves a curiously soft-blended tapestry of humor, humility, pride and metaphysical provocation out of the hard realities...: the tin-shack lives, the alcohol dreams, the bad luck and burlesque disasters, and the self-destructive courage of his characters."

Alexie's other collections of poetry include:

- The Business of Fancydancing: Stories and Poems (1992)
- Old Shirts and New Skins (1993)
- First Indian on the Moon (1993)
- Seven Mourning Songs For the Cedar Flute I Have Yet to Learn to Play (1994)
- Water Flowing Home (1996)
- The Summer of Black Widows (1996)
- The Man Who Loves Salmon (1998)
- One Stick Song (2000)
- Face (2009), Hanging Loose Press (April 15, 2009) hardcover, 160 pages, ISBN 978-1-931236-71-3

=== Short stories ===
Alexie published his first prose work, entitled The Lone Ranger and Tonto Fistfight in Heaven, in 1993. The book consists of a series of short stories that are interconnected. Several prominent characters are explored, and they have been featured in later works by Alexie. According to Sarah A. Quirk, The Lone Ranger and Tonto Fistfight in Heaven can be considered a bildungsroman with dual protagonists, "Victor Joseph and Thomas Builds-the-Fire, moving from relative innocence to a mature level on experience."

Ten Little Indians (2004) is a collection of "nine extraordinary short stories set in and around the Seattle area, featuring Spokane Indians from all walks of urban life," according to Christine C. Menefee of the School Library Journal. In this collection, Alexie "challenges stereotypes that whites have of Native Americans and at the same time shows the Native American characters coming to terms with their own identities."

War Dances is a collection of short stories, poems, and short works. It won the 2010 PEN/Faulkner Award for Fiction. The collection, however, received mixed reviews.

Other short stories by Alexie include:

- Superman and Me (1997)
- The Toughest Indian in the World (2000) (collection of short stories)
- "What You Pawn I Will Redeem" (2003), published in The New Yorker
- Blasphemy: New and Selected Stories (2012)
- "Because My Father Always Said He Was the Only Indian Who Saw Jimi Hendrix Play 'The Star−Spangled Banner' at Woodstock"

=== Novels ===
In his first novel, Reservation Blues (1995), Alexie revisits some of the characters from The Lone Ranger and Tonto Fistfight in Heaven. Thomas Builds-the-Fire, Victor Joseph, and Junior Polatkin, who have grown up together on the Spokane Indian reservation, were teenagers in the short story collection. In Reservation Blues, they are now adult men in their thirties. Some of them are now musicians and in a band together. Verlyn Klinkenborg of the Los Angeles Times wrote in a 1995 review of Reservation Blues: "you can feel Alexie's purposely divided attention, his alertness to a divided audience, Native American and Anglo." Klinkenborg says that Alexie is "willing to risk didacticism whenever he stops to explain the particulars of the Spokane and, more broadly, the Native American experience to his readers."

Indian Killer (1996) is a murder mystery set among Native American adults in contemporary Seattle, where the characters struggle with urban life, mental health, and the knowledge that there is a serial killer on the loose. Characters deal with the racism in the university system, as well as in the community at large, where Indians are subjected to being lectured about their own culture by white professors who are actually ignorant of Indian cultures.

Alexie's young adult novel, The Absolutely True Diary of a Part-Time Indian (2007), is a coming-of-age story that began as a memoir of his life and family on the Spokane Indian reservation. The novel focuses on a fourteen-year-old Indian named Arnold Spirit. The novel is semi-autobiographical, including many events and elements of Alexie's life. For example, Arnold was born with hydrocephalus and was teased a lot as a child. The story also portrays events after Arnold's transfer to Reardan High School, which Alexie attended. The novel received great reviews and continues to be a top seller. Bruce Barcott from the New York Times Book Review observed, "Working in the voice of a 14-year-old forces Alexie to strip everything down to action and emotion, so that reading becomes more like listening to your smart, funny best friend recount his day while waiting after school for a ride home."

Flight (2007) also features an adolescent protagonist. The narrator, who calls himself "Zits," is a 15-year-old orphan of mixed Native and European ancestry who has bounced around the foster system in Seattle. The novel explores experiences of the past, as Zits experiences short windows into others' lives after he believes himself to be shot while committing a crime.

=== Memoir ===
Alexie's memoir, You Don't Have to Say You Love Me, was released by Hachette in June 2017. Claudia Rowe of The Seattle Times wrote in June 2017 that the memoir "pulls readers so deeply into the author's youth on the Spokane Indian Reservation that most will forget all about facile comparisons and simply surrender to Alexie's unmistakable patois of humor and profanity, history and pathos." Alexie cancelled his book tour in support of You Don't Have to Say You Love Me in July 2017 due to the emotional toll that promoting the book was taking. Two months later, Alexie decided to resume the tour, with some significant changes. As he related to Laurie Hertzel of The Star Tribune, "I'm not performing the book," he said. "I'm getting interviewed. That's a whole different thing." Alexie went on to add that he would not be answering any questions that he did not want to answer. "I'll put my armor back on," Alexie said.

=== Films ===
In 1998, Alexie's film Smoke Signals gained considerable attention. He based the screenplay on his short story collection, The Lone Ranger and Tonto Fistfight in Heaven, and characters and events from a number of Alexie's works make appearances in the film. The film was directed by Chris Eyre, (Cheyenne-Arapaho) with a predominantly Native American production team and cast. The film is a road movie and buddy film, featuring two young Indians, Victor Joseph (Adam Beach) and Thomas Builds the Fire (Evan Adams), who leave the reservation on a road trip to retrieve the body of Victor's dead father (Gary Farmer). During their journey, the characters' childhood is explored via flashbacks. The film took top honors at the Sundance Film Festival. It received an 86% and "fresh" rating from the online film database Rotten Tomatoes.

The Business of Fancydancing, written and directed by Alexie in 2002, explores themes of Indian identity, gay identity, cultural involvement vs blood quantum, living on the reservation or off it, and other issues related to what makes someone a "real Indian." The title refers to the protagonist's choice to leave the reservation and make his living performing for predominantly-white audiences. Evan Adams, who plays Thomas Builds the Fire in "Smoke Signals", again stars, now as an urban gay man with a white partner. The death of a peer brings the protagonist home to the reservation, where he reunites with his friends from his childhood and youth. The film is unique in that Alexie hired an almost completely female crew to produce the film. Many of the actors improvised their dialogue, based on real events in their lives. It received a 57 percent and "rotten" rating from the online film database Rotten Tomatoes.

Other film projects include:

- Sonicsgate (participant, 2009)

== Bibliography ==
=== Poetry ===
Collections

- The Business of Fancydancing: Stories and Poems (1992)
- Old Shirts and New Skins (1993)
- First Indian on the Moon (1993)
- Seven Mourning Songs For the Cedar Flute I Have Yet to Learn to Play (1994)
- Water Flowing Home (1996)
- The Summer of Black Widows (1996)
- The Man Who Loves Salmon (1998)
- One Stick Song (2000)
- Face (2009), Hanging Loose Press (April 15, 2009) hardcover, 160 pages, ISBN 978-1-931236-71-3
- Hymn (2017)

List of poems

Title	Year	First published	Reprinted/collected	Notes
10-4	2011	Alexie, Sherman (February 23, 2011). "10-4". Narrative Magazine (Fall 2011). Archived from the original on February 28, 2019.		
Double Wit	2011	Alexie, Sherman (February 23, 2011). "Double Wit". Narrative Magazine (Fall 2011). Archived from the original on February 28, 2019.		
Sasquatch Exposes the American Caste System	2011	Alexie, Sherman (February 23, 2011). "Sasquatch Exposes the American Caste System". Narrative Magazine (Fall 2011). Archived from the original on February 28, 2019.		
16D	2011	Alexie, Sherman (February 24, 2011). "16D". Narrative Magazine (Poems of the Week: 2010–2011).		
In'din Curse	2012	Alexie, Sherman (March 29, 2011). "In'din Curse". Narrative Magazine (Winter 2012).		
Autopsy	2017	Alexie, Sherman (January 31, 2017). "Autopsy". Early Bird Books.		
Hymn	2017	Alexie, Sherman (August 16, 2017). "Hymn". Early Bird Books.		

=== Memoirs ===
- You Don't Have to Say You Love Me (2017), Hachette Book Group, ISBN 9780316396776.

=== Novels ===
- Reservation Blues (1995)
- Indian Killer (1996)
- The Absolutely True Diary of a Part-Time Indian (2007)
- Flight (2007)

=== Short fiction ===
Collections

- The Lone Ranger and Tonto Fistfight in Heaven (1993)
- The Toughest Indian in the World (2000)
- Ten Little Indians (2004)
- War Dances (2009)
- Blasphemy: New and Selected Stories (2012)

List of short stories

Title	Year	First published	Reprinted/collected	Notes
Superman and Me	1997	Alexie, Sherman (April 19, 1998). "Superman and Me". The Los Angeles Times.		
What You Pawn I Will Redeem	2003	Alexie, Sherman (April 21, 2003). "What You Pawn I Will Redeem". The New Yorker.	Best American Short Stories 2004	
The Human Comedy	2010	Alexie, Sherman (February 2010). "The Human Comedy". Narrative Magazine (Fall 2010).		A six-word story.
Idolatry	2011	Alexie, Sherman (February 3, 2010). "Idolatry". Narrative Magazine (Spring 2011).		
A Strange Day in July	2011		The Chronicles of Harris Burdick: Fourteen Amazing Authors Tell the Tales	
Murder-Suicide	2012	Alexie, Sherman (April 8, 2011). "Murder-Suicide". Narrative Magazine (Winter 2012).		A six-word story.
Happy Trails	2013	Alexie, Sherman (June 10–17, 2013). "Happy Trails". The New Yorker. Vol. 89, no. 17. pp. 64–65.		
The Human Comedy Part II	2016	Alexie, Sherman (September 22, 2015). "The Human Comedy Party II". Narrative Magazine (Winter 2016).		A six-word story.
Clean, Cleaner, Cleanest	2017	Alexie, Sherman (April 21, 2003). "Clean, Cleaner, Cleanest". The New Yorker.		
A Vacuum Is a Space Entirely Devoid of Matter	2017	Alexie, Sherman (July 11, 2017). "A Vacuum Is a Space Entirely Devoid of Matter". Narrative Magazine (Fall 2017).		

=== Children's books ===
- Thunder Boy, Jr. (2016), illustrated by Yuyi Morales

=== Critical studies and reviews of Alexie's work ===
Indian killer

- Abele, Elizabeth (Fall 2023). "From Alexie's Indian Killer to Johnson's Longmire series: expanding the landscape of the American Indian detective novel". Clues: A Journal of Detection. 41 (2): 31–42.

== Personal life ==
Alexie is married to Diane Tomhave, a citizen of the Three Affiliated Tribes of the Fort Berthold Reservation of Hidatsa, Ho-Chunk and Potawatomi heritage. They live in Seattle with their two sons.

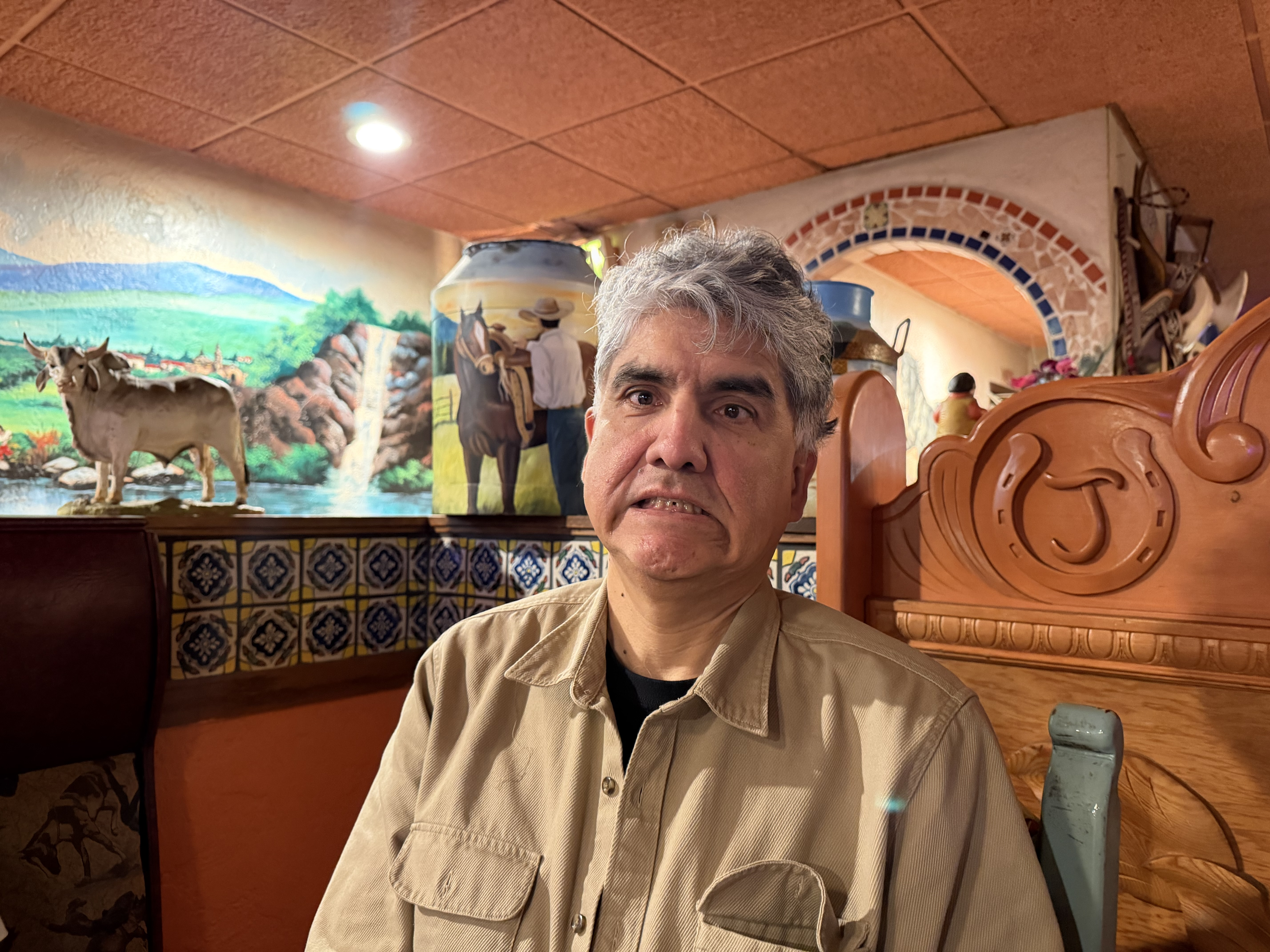
Sherman Alexie, taken by Parker Alexie

== Arizona HB 2281 ==
In 2012, Arizona's HB 2281 removed Alexie's works, along with those of others, from Arizona school curriculum. Alexie's response:

Let's get one thing out of the way: Mexican immigration is an oxymoron. Mexicans are indigenous. So, in a strange way, I'm pleased that the racist folks of Arizona have officially declared, in banning me alongside Urrea, Baca, and Castillo, that their anti-immigration laws are also anti-Indian. I'm also strangely pleased that the folks of Arizona have officially announced their fear of an educated underclass. You give those brown kids some books about brown folks and what happens? Those brown kids change the world. In the effort to vanish our books, Arizona has actually given them enormous power. Arizona has made our books sacred documents now.

== Style ==
Alexie's influences for his literary works do not rely solely on traditional Indian forms. He "blends elements of popular culture, Indian spirituality, and the drudgery of poverty-ridden reservation life to create his characters and the world they inhabit," according to Quirk. Alexie's work often includes humor as well. According to Quirk, he does this as a "means of cultural survival for American Indians—survival in the face of the larger American culture's stereotypes of American Indians and their concomitant distillation of individual tribal characteristics into one pan-Indian consciousness."

== Awards and honors ==
1992

- National Endowment for the Arts Poetry Fellowship

1993

- Alexi short stories
- PEN/Hemingway Award for Best First Book of Fiction for the story collection The Lone Ranger and Tonto Fistfight in Heaven

1994

- Lila Wallace-Reader's Digest Writers' Award

1996

- American Book Award (Before Columbus Foundation) for Reservation Blues
- Granta Magazine: Twenty Best American Novelists Under the Age of 40
- New York Times Notable Book for Indian Killer
- People Magazine: Best of Pages

1999

- The New Yorker: 20 Writers for the 21st Century

2001

- PEN/Malamud Award

2007

- National Book Award, Young People's Literature, for The Absolutely True Diary of a Part-Time Indian

2009

- American Library Association Odyssey Award as the year's "best audiobook for children or young adults", read by Alexie (Frederick, MD: Recorded Books, LLC, 2008, ISBN 1-4361-2490-5)

2010

- PEN/Faulkner Award for War Dances
- Native Writers' Circle of the Americas Lifetime Achievement Award
- Puterbaugh Award ", the first American Puterbaugh fellow
- California Young Reader Medal for The Absolutely True Diary of a Part-Time Indian

2013

- The John Dos Passos Prize for Literature

== See also ==
- List of writers from peoples indigenous to the Americas
- Louise Erdrich
- Native American Renaissance
- Native American studies
- There There (novel)

== External links and further reading ==
- Western American Literature Journal: Sherman Alexie
- Official website
- Sherman Alexie at the Internet Speculative Fiction Database
- Sherman Alexie at IMDb
- Voice of the New Tribes article by Duncan Campbell in "The Guardian" January 3, 2003
- Sherman Alexie's poem "Punch" in Gulf Coast: A Journal of Literature and Fine Arts (24.1).
- Berglund, Jeff and Jan Roush, eds. Sherman Alexie: A Collection of Critical Essays, (2010) ISBN 978-1-60781-008-7.
- Sherman Alexie at the Library of Congress, with 26 library catalog records
- Appearances on C-SPAN
- Sherman Alexie's heartbreaking reason for pausing his book tour - via KUOW News and Information

Interviews

- "Sherman Alexie" by Robert Capriccioso, Identity Theory, published March 23, 2003
- "Sherman Alexie" by Joelle Fraser, Iowa Review, copyright 2001
- "Northwest Passages: Sherman Alexie" by Emily Harris, Think Out Loud, Oregon Public Broadcasting, broadcast October 8, 2009
- "Interview With Sherman Alexie" as 2007 National Book Award winner, by Rita Williams-Garcia
- "No More Playing Dead for American Indian Filmmaker Sherman Alexie" by Rita Kempley, The Washington Post, July 3, 1998
- "Sherman Alexie on Living Outside Cultural Borders" by Bill Moyers, broadcast April 12, 2013 – with "Dig Deeper" on Alexie's life, work, and influence
