= Smoke Signals (film) =

1998 film by Chris Eyre

- Theatrical release poster
- Directed by: Chris Eyre
- Screenplay by: Sherman Alexie
- Based on: The Lone Ranger and Tonto Fistfight in Heaven by Sherman Alexie
- Produced by: Larry Estes; Scott Rosenfelt
- Starring: Adam Beach; Evan Adams; Irene Bedard; Gary Farmer; Tantoo Cardinal
- Cinematography: Brian Capener
- Edited by: Brian Berdan
- Music by: B.C. Smith
- Production company: ShadowCatcher Entertainment
- Distributed by: Miramax Films
- Release date: July 3, 1998
- Running time: 89 minutes
- Countries: United States; Canada
- Language: English
- Budget: $2 million (est.)
- Box office: $6.7 million

Smoke Signals is a 1998 coming-of-age comedy-drama film directed by Chris Eyre from a screenplay by Sherman Alexie, based on Alexie's short story collection The Lone Ranger and Tonto Fistfight in Heaven (1993). The film won several awards and accolades, and was well received at numerous film festivals.

In 2018, the film was selected by the Library of Congress for preservation in the United States National Film Registry for being "culturally, historically, or aesthetically significant."

== Plot ==
Hot-tempered basketball player Victor Joseph and eccentric storyteller Thomas Builds-the-Fire live on the Coeur d'Alene Indian Reservation in Plummer, Idaho. The two men are brought together through Victor's father, Arnold, who rescued Thomas as an infant from a house fire that killed his parents in 1976. Because of this, Thomas considers him a hero. On the other hand, Victor, who endures Arnold's alcoholism, domestic violence, and eventual child abandonment, regards his father with both deep love and bitter resentment. Thomas and Victor grow up together as neighbors and acquaintances, fighting with each other and simultaneously forming a close, albeit uneasy, friendship.

When Arnold dies in Phoenix, Arizona, where he has stayed after leaving Victor and his mother Arlene, Victor and Thomas go on an adventure to retrieve his ashes. The trip is the means for Victor and Thomas to explore their identities. Neither of them loses sight of his identity as an "Indian", but their perspectives differ. Victor is more stoic and Thomas is more traditional (and romantic to the point of watching the feature film Dances with Wolves countless times). Their dichotomy is portrayed all through the film; it results in Victor being irritated with Thomas, and Thomas being fascinated with Victor.

Once they reach Phoenix, Victor has to confront his conflicted feelings about his father, as well as his own identity. He has to grapple with a new account of Thomas's parents' death, as told by Arnold's friend Suzy Song, who reveals that Arnold had drunkenly set off fireworks and accidentally started the fire that killed Thomas' parents. The road trip by the young men leads to Thomas reconciling with the memory of his hero Arnold, as he understands more of his path to alcoholism and related abuse and abandonment. Victor also gains a better understanding of Thomas and his reverence for Arnold. Victor and Thomas eventually throw Arnold's ashes into a river as a form of acceptance.

== Cast ==
- Adam Beach as Victor Joseph
  - Cody Lightning as young Victor Joseph
- Evan Adams as Thomas Builds-the-Fire
  - Simon Baker as young Thomas Builds-the-Fire
- Irene Bedard as Suzy Song
- Gary Farmer as Arnold Joseph
- Tantoo Cardinal as Arlene Joseph
- John Trudell as Randy Peone
- Michael Greyeyes as Junior Polatkin
- Michelle St. John as Velma
- Elaine Miles as Lucy
- Cynthia Geary as Cathy the gymnast
- Perrey Reeves as Holly
- Molly Cheek as Penny Cicero
- Robert Miano as Burt Cicero
- Tom Skerritt as police chief

== Production ==
While it was not the first film created by native filmmakers in the United States, Smoke Signals is recognized as being the first feature-length film written, directed, and produced by Native Americans to reach a wide audience both in the US and abroad. This film is also notable for its authenticity with regard to its cast of Native American actors and actresses, and because it was filmed on location on the Coeur d'Alene Indian Reservation in Idaho. Filming occurred during mid-1997.

== Reception ==
=== Critical response ===
Smoke Signals was well received by mainstream critics. On Rotten Tomatoes, the film holds an approval rating of 90% based on 93 reviews, with an average rating of 7.6/10. The website's critics consensus reads: "Smoke Signals tells a familiar story from an underrepresented point of view, proving that a fresh perspective can help subvert long-established expectations." On Metacritic, the film has a weighted average score of 76 out of 100, based on 17 critics, indicating "generally favorable reviews".

Peter Stack of the San Francisco Chronicle gave the film a rave review, calling it, "unpretentious, funny and soulful ... Well-acted, well-written, with spare, beautiful imagery." Kevin Thomas of the Los Angeles Times described Smoke Signals as "a warm film of friendship and reconciliation, and whenever it refers to historic injustices or contemporary issues in Native American culture, it does so with wry, glancing humor. Smoke Signals is indeed poignant, but above all it's pretty funny." Marc Savlov of The Austin Chronicle called the film "poignant and slyly humorous" and "alight with oddball nuances and wry observations," saying further, "the cast is uniformly excellent in their roles, and Eyre's persistent use of long, trailing shots reinforces the story's elegiac tone. Simple and elegant, Smoke Signals is a delicious, heady debut that lingers long after the tale is told."

Susan Tavernetti of the Palo Alto Weekly, gave the film a mixed review, saying that "although sometimes the attempt to break down stereotypes seems stilted and forced, more often the result is humorous." She also said, "Chris Eyre's direction establishes an uneven tone, allowing some actors to deliver performances bordering on broad caricature while others play their roles straight." She praised the opening and closing sequences which "beautifully combine poetic voice-overs with visual lyricism."

=== Accolades ===
- 1998 – American Indian Film Festival: Best film
- 1998 – Christopher Award
- 1998 – First Americans in the Arts: Outstanding Achievement in Writing (Sherman Alexie), Outstanding Performance by an Actor in a Film (Evan Adams), Outstanding Achievement in Directing (Chris Eyre)
- 1998 – Gotham Awards: Nominations: Open Palm Award
- 1998 – National Board of Review: Special Recognition For Excellence In Filmmaking
- 1998 – San Diego World Film Festival: Best American Independent Feature; Best Screenplay (Sherman Alexie); Best Actor (Adam Beach); Best Director (Chris Eyre)
- 1998 – Sundance Film Festival: Filmmaker's Trophy (Chris Eyre); Audience Award. Nominations: Grand Jury Prize
- 1998 – Taos Talking Picture Festival: Taos Land Grant Award (Chris Eyre)
- 1998 – Tokyo International Film Festival: Best Artistic Contribution (Chris Eyre) (tie)
- 1999 – Florida Film Critics Circle Awards: Best Newcomer (Chris Eyre/Sherman Alexie)
- 1999 – Independent Spirit Awards: Best Debut Performance (Evan Adams). Nominations: Best Supporting Male nomination (Gary Farmer), Best First Screenplay nomination (Sherman Alexie)
- 1999 – Young Artist Awards: Nominations: Best Performance in a Feature Film-Supporting Young Actor (Cody Lightning)
- 2018 – National Film Registry

== Legacy ==
In 2023 Cody Lightning, who had portrayed the young Victor in the original film, released the mockumentary comedy film Hey, Viktor!, in which a fictionalized version of himself formulates a plan to revive his fading career by creating his own self-funded sequel to Smoke Signals.

== Home media and rights ==
Smoke Signals was released on VHS by Miramax Home Entertainment on January 12, 1999, with the DVD release following on September 28, 1999. On January 26, 1999, the film also received a U.S. LaserDisc release.

In 2010, Miramax was sold by The Walt Disney Company (their owners since 1993), with the studio being taken over by private equity firm Filmyard Holdings that same year. Filmyard sublicensed the home video rights for several Miramax titles to Echo Bridge Entertainment. On June 14, 2011, Echo Bridge reissued Smoke Signals on DVD.

Filmyard Holdings sold Miramax to Qatari company beIN Media Group during March 2016. beIN had control of the film during its 2018 induction into the United States National Film Registry, despite beIN being a Qatari-state owned company. In April 2020, ViacomCBS (now known as Paramount Skydance) acquired the rights to Miramax's library, after buying a 49% stake in Miramax; the majority 51% stake still belongs to beIN. Smoke Signals was one of the 700 titles Paramount acquired in the deal, and since April 2020 it has been distributed by Paramount Pictures. The film was later made available on Paramount's streaming service Paramount+.

== See also ==
- Powwow Highway
