= Fancy dance =

Style of dance practiced by Indigenous Peoples of North America

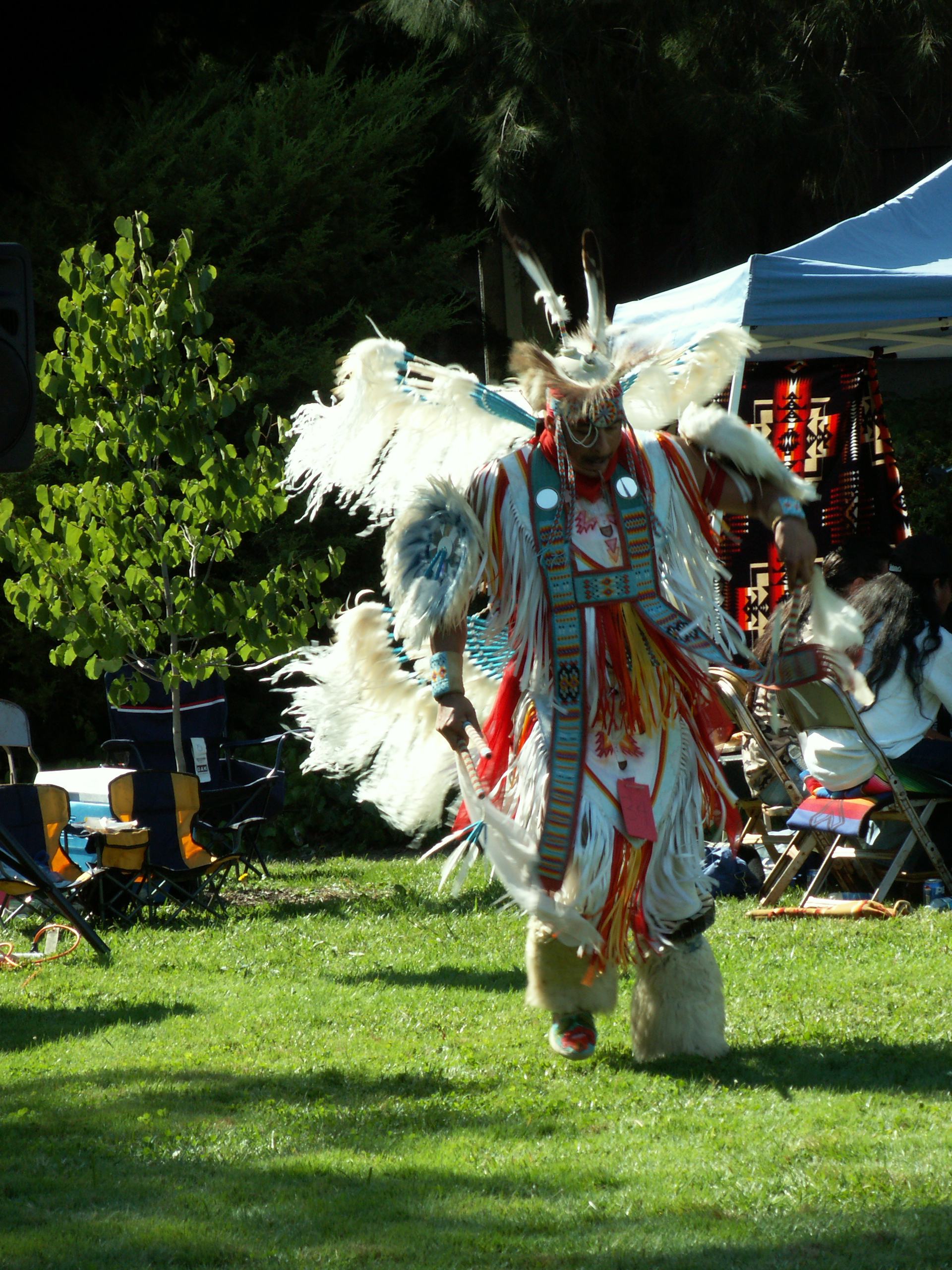
A Northern style Men's Fancy Dancer at the West Valley Powwow in Saratoga, CA, 2005

Fancy dance, Pan-Indian dancing, Fancy Feather or Fancy War Dance is a style of dance some believe was originally created by members of the Ponca tribe in the 1920s and 1930s, in an attempt to preserve their culture and religion. It is loosely based on the war dance. Fancy dance was considered appropriate to be performed for visitors to reservations and at "Wild West" shows. But today, fancy dancers can be seen at many powwows across the nation and even the world.

== History ==
Native American dances, the practices of medicine men, and religious ceremonies were banned by White authorities with the introduction of The Code of Indian Offenses in 1883. As in many oppressed cultures, the ceremonies simply went underground to avoid detection by the authorities. Tribes created new dances that could legally be danced in public. Kiowa and Comanche created new styles of dance regalia in the 1930s that included long-johns with bells attached to the knee up to the waist, two small arm bustles with white fluff, two bustles with white down, beadwork harnesses, and some feathers, and the roach being tall and usually with fluffs. This regalia would be incorporated into the fancy dance.

The fancy dance was developed after 1928, when the Ponca Tribe built their own dance arena in White Eagle, Oklahoma. Two young Ponca boys are specifically credited with developing the fast-paced dance that the audiences loved. One of the boys was the grandfather of Parrish Williams, a Ponca roadman. The Wild West shows popularized the dance. Gus McDonald (Ponca) was the first World Champion Fancy War Dancer.

The intertribal powwow circuit was established in the early 20th century, spreading across the Southern Plains. The Kiowa held contest powwows as early as 1918. Among Kiowa, fancy dancing was incorporated into the O-ho-mah Society. Contest powwows became an important source of income during the Great Depression. Professional fancy dancers of the 1930s included Chester Lefthand (Arapaho), Stephen Mopope (Kiowa), Dennis Rough Face (Ponca), and George "Woogie" Watchetaker (Comanche). In the 1940s, Elmer Sugar Brown added back flips to his fancy dancing and Gus McDonald added both cartwheels and splits.

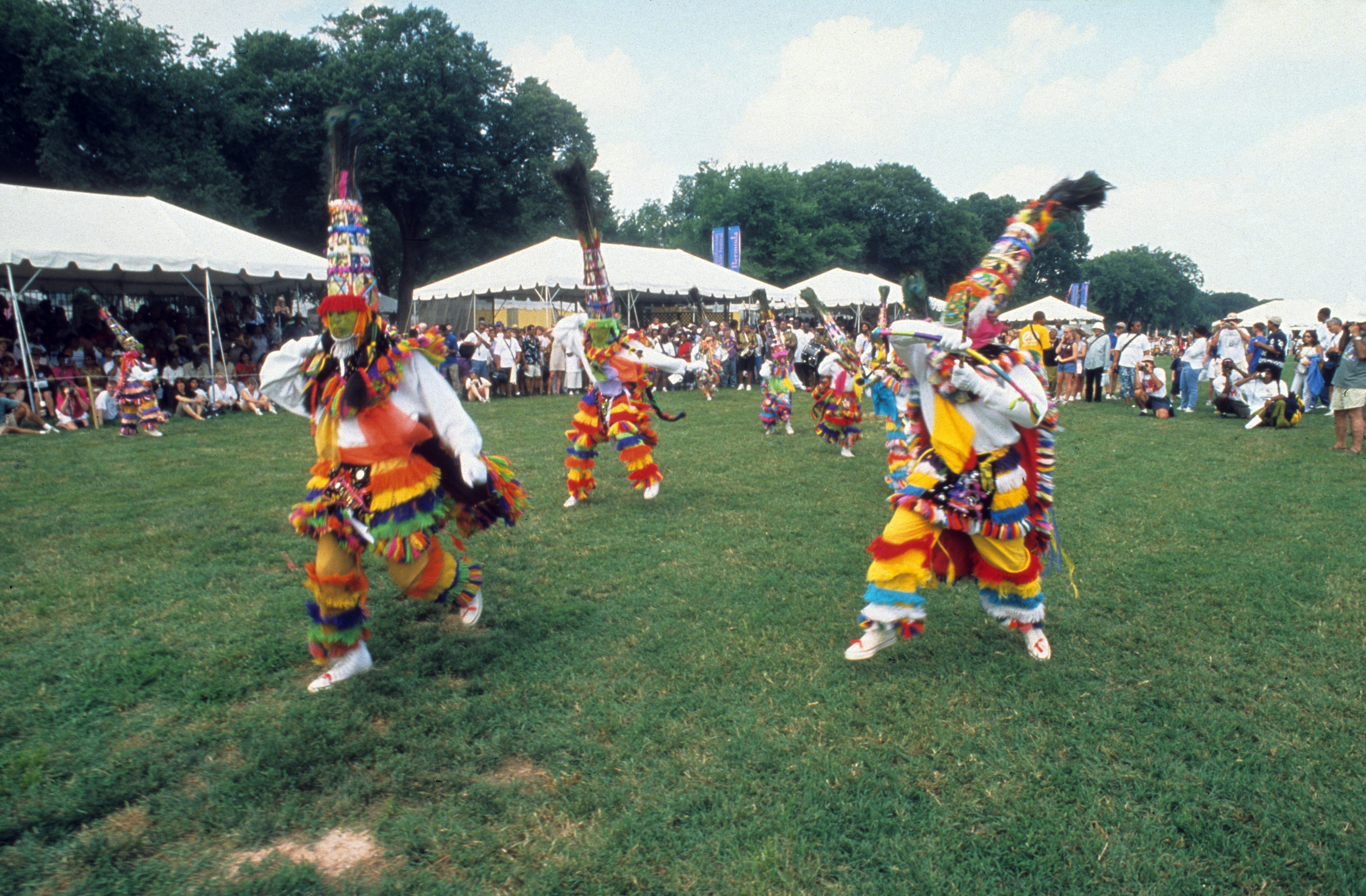
Gombey dancers at the Smithsonian Folklife Festival in 2001.

In the late 1930s, women began fancy dancing, wearing the same regalia as men. By the 1940s, women's fancy dancing was well established. Shalah Rowlen (Sac and Fox) fancy danced with her sisters, wearing bustles, in the early 1940s. Women's fancy dancing declined in the 1950s, but in the 1960s and 1970s, the dance came back as the women's fancy shawl dance.

Despite its name, derived from an African language, the Gombey dancers of Bermuda appear to owe more to Algonquian traditions, thanks to hundreds of Native Americans sent to Bermuda as slaves during the Seventeenth Century. Their modern costume is completely reliant on materials that would have been difficult or impossible to obtain in Bermuda during the Seventeenth and Eighteenth Centuries, including the tailfeathers of the Asian peacock that adorn the head dress. Feathers of native birds perhaps once were used to adorn a simpler, but still colourful costume. Their dance was clearly once a war dance, with the troupe member called The Bowman or Lead Indian carrying a bow and arrow and often going slightly ahead of the troupe to scout the way on long marches, and the Warriors carrying tomahawks, which they place on their shoulders and use during cockfights when they face off against each other, and the steps were recognised by Wampanoag dancers after the Wampanoag and Pequots began a series of Reconnection festivals with Bermudians in 2000.

== Description ==
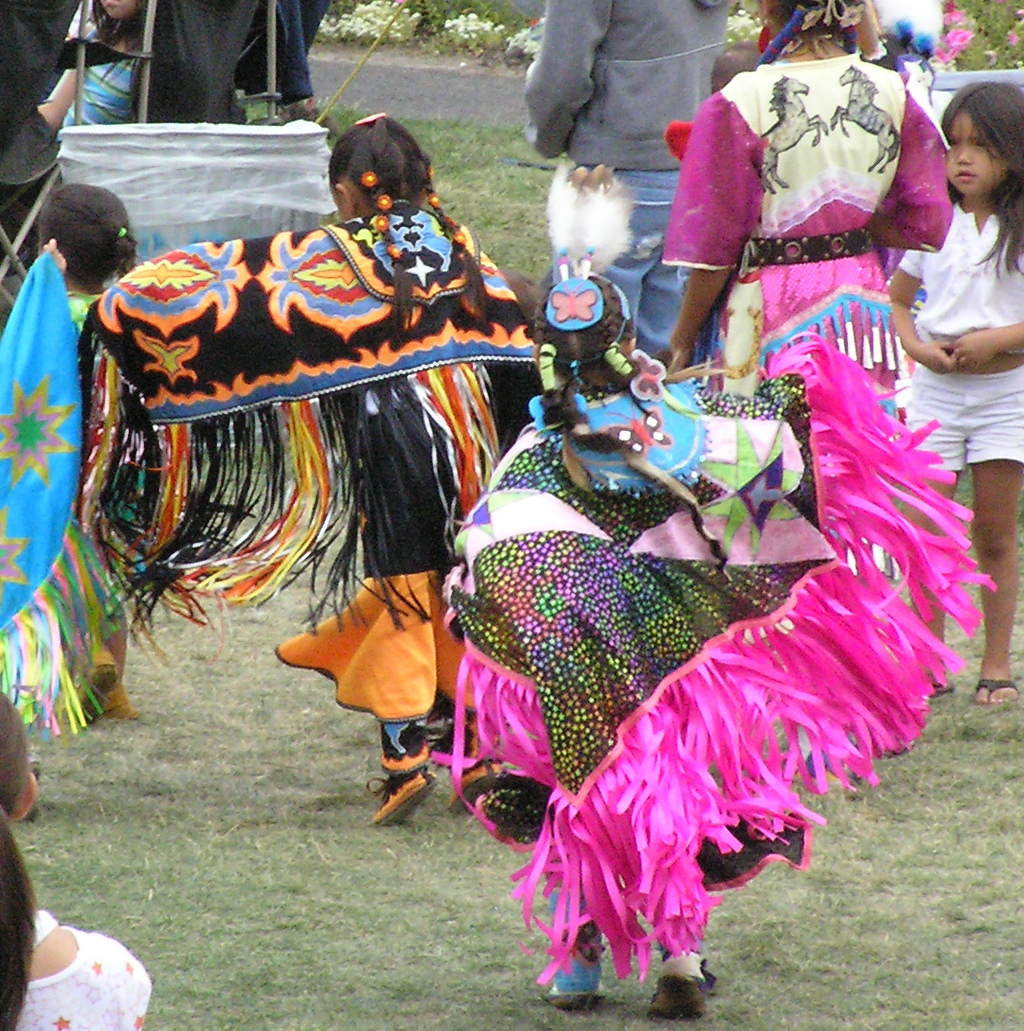
Young girls fancy shawl dancing at Spokane Powwow

Men's fancy dance is flashy, colorful and highly energetic. It requires strength and stamina and is usually performed by younger men and boys. The drum can play a medium war beat, a ruffle, crow hop, and a fast beat. It is always expected that a fancy dancer should do a pose at each end of the beat. Some might do splits or stop in mid-air. Male fancy dancers typically wear brightly colored regalia. Twin feather bustles are one of the hallmarks of modern fancy dance regalia, along with a beaded bodice, leggings or breech cloth and side tabs (most popular), bells just below the knees, Icelandic sheep hair or also known as "Goats", moccasins, a roach with two feathers (Most wear a roach rocker which rocks the feathers with the dancer's movements), beaded cuffs, beaded headband, and other feathered or beaded accouterments. The regalia often has a fringe of many colors. The old style regalia is making a comeback.

The women's fancy shawl dance represents the opening of a cocoon when the butterfly emerges. The shawl is usually the most extravagant piece. The fringed shawls are colorful and flashy, often featuring embroidery or ribbon work. The fringe on the shawl have a movement that coincides with the dancer. The dancers usually wear beaded or appliqued designs, and beaded hairpieces. Chokers, earrings, bracelets, and eagle plumes are usually worn as well. Elaborate moccasins and leggings complete the regalia. The practice of women's fancy shawl dance is far more recent than that of Men's Fancy Dance. It was not until fancy dance had existed for several decades that women began to participate.

== Competition ==
The men's fancy dance is one of the most popular contemporary powwow dances. Thus living up to its name, the fancy dance is a highly athletic dance with lots of movement. As the dancer dances, his regalia moves with the dancer to create the tone of the following of motion. The medium war, ruffle, crow hop, and fast beats are usually mixed together and are usually called mix-up songs or confusion songs. The Fancy Dancer must dance according to the beat and must strike a "pose" whenever the drum beat stops. Singers can try to trick the dances with unexpected final beats.

The popularity of fancy dance - sometimes as a competitive sport - has spread, and is now practiced by many Native American tribes.

== See also ==
- Bustle
- Native American music
- The Business of Fancydancing
