= Bustle (regalia) =

Part of men's powwow regalia

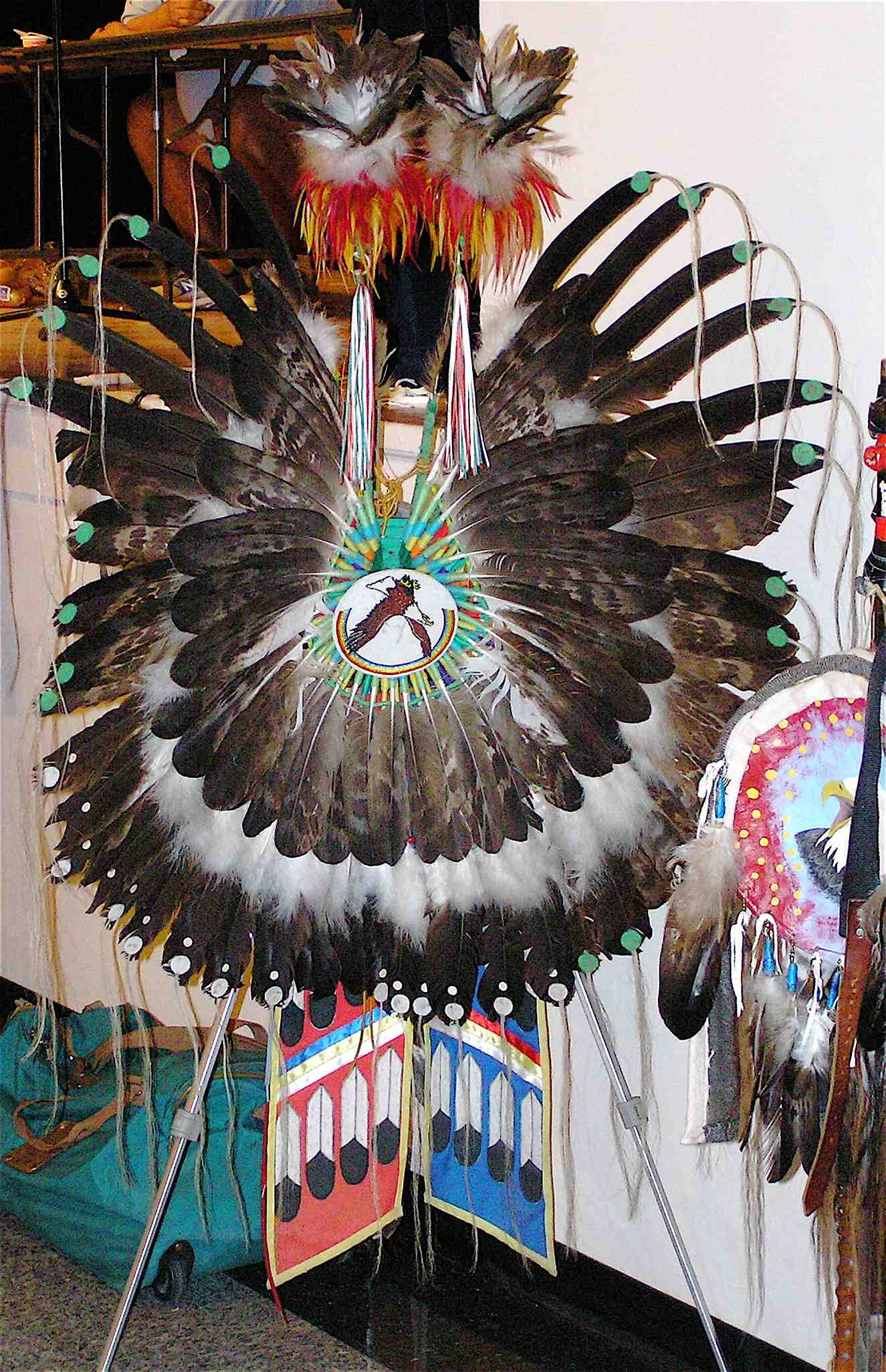

The Native American bustle is a traditional part of a man's regalia worn during a dance exhibition or wachipi (pow wow) and originates from the Plains region of the United States. In its modern form, the men's bustle is typically made of a string of eagle or hawk feathers attached to a backboard. Eagle and hawk feathers are sacred religious objects to Native American people and the possession of eagle and hawk feathers are protected by the eagle feather law (50 CFR 22).

There are several types of bustles, the modern one being in the shape of a U and the other, traditional bustle or "old-style" bustle, being circular. The dancer's style generally dictates the type and number of bustles worn. A typical traditional dancer wears a single bustle while fancy dancers generally wear two bustles, one attached to a belt above the buttocks and another attached to a harness on the back.
