= Carl Moon =

American photographer, artist and writer

Carl E. Moon
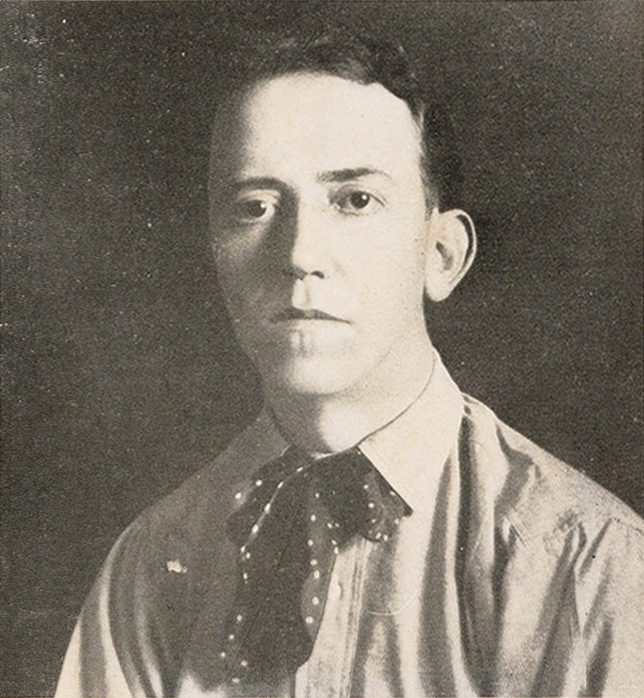
- Born: Karl Everton Moon; October 5, 1878; Wilmington, Ohio, U.S.
- Died: June 24, 1948 (aged 80); San Francisco, California, U.S.
- Occupations: Photographer, painter, illustrator, writer
- Spouse(s): Bessie Wilson (unknown–1903); Grace Purdie Moon (1884–1947)

Carl Everton Moon (October 5, 1878 – June 24, 1948) was an American photographer, book and magazine illustrator, painter and writer focused on Native American subjects. He has been called "the imitator of Edward Curtis" and "the last of the great early photographers to go west".

== Early life and early career ==
Carl Everton Moon (or Karl, as he spelled his name prior to anti-German sentiment during World War I) was born in Wilmington, Ohio, on October 5, 1878. After serving two years in the Ohio National Guard, he became a photographer's apprentice. He studied the trade for six years in Ohio and West Virginia. In 1903, he set up his own studio in Albuquerque, New Mexico. The move was precipitated by the fact his first wife Bessie Wilson had contracted tuberculosis. At the time, a hot, dry climate was thought to be an effective cure. In addition, as a boy, Moon had determined to head West after reading James Fenimore Cooper's adventure stories.

When I was twenty-three, I did just as I said I would do, but instead of hunting Indians with a gun and bowie knife, as the storybook heroes always did, I was to hunt my Indians with a camera, paintbrushes and a writing pad.

— Carl Moon, Indian Legends in Rhyme, 2000 Edition, Afterword by Tom Driebe

Bessie died shortly after their arrival in Albuquerque. Moon began his work with the Indians alone.

From 1903 to 1907, he made photographs and oil paintings of Pueblo peoples in the area. As a painter, he studied with visiting artists Thomas Moran, Frank Sauerwein and Louis Akin. Moon's studio was close to several Native American villages; many of the inhabitants came into town to sell beadwork, buckskin leather goods, pottery and silver jewelry. He slowly gained their trust. The Indians began coming to Moon's studio and, in turn, he visited them in their communities, sometimes spending weeks at a time. Using the heavy, clumsy cameras of the period, he started making photographic "art studies" as he called them.

From 1905 to 1906, Moon had a short-lived partnership with Albuquerque businessman Thomas F. Keleher in the Moon-Keleher Studio. When the partnership dissolved, Moon continued his work, photographing chosen portrait subjects in a posed, romantic style. He published and exhibited many of the photographs nationally, including a show at the Museum of Natural History in New York. As a result of a meeting with publisher James Adams Thayer, Moon's photos appeared on the covers of Ridgway Magazine, The Literary Digest, Century, The Burr McIntosh Monthly and The New York Times. The photographs and paintings soon came to the notice of President Theodore Roosevelt who invited Moon to show them at the White House.

== The Fred Harvey Company ==
In 1907, Moon left Albuquerque for the photographic studio Fred Harvey had established at El Tovar Hotel on the south rim of the Grand Canyon. He was commissioned by the Fred Harvey Company to take pictures of Native American communities throughout the Southwest: Arizona, New Mexico and Oklahoma. The photos would become the Fred Harvey Collection of Southwest Indian Pictures. They were used in marketing materials by the Fred Harvey Company and the Santa Fe Railroad, for which Moon was the official photographer. Harvey operated a chain of successful gift shops, restaurants and hotels, known as Harvey Houses, along the rail lines of the Southwest. The Harvey Company used Moon's photographs (often without credit) on their postcards, and in brochures and publications for the tourist industry. Harvey Co. had partnered with the railroad in 1876 to generate tourism in the region.

The majority of photos represent Hopi, Navajo and Taos Pueblo peoples, but there are also images of Osage, Apache, Zuni and other Southwestern peoples. There are numerous formal portraits, as well as posed, romanticized scenes depicting storytelling, hunting, weaving, pottery making and playing instruments. Candid images show people in their daily activities and dance ceremonies.

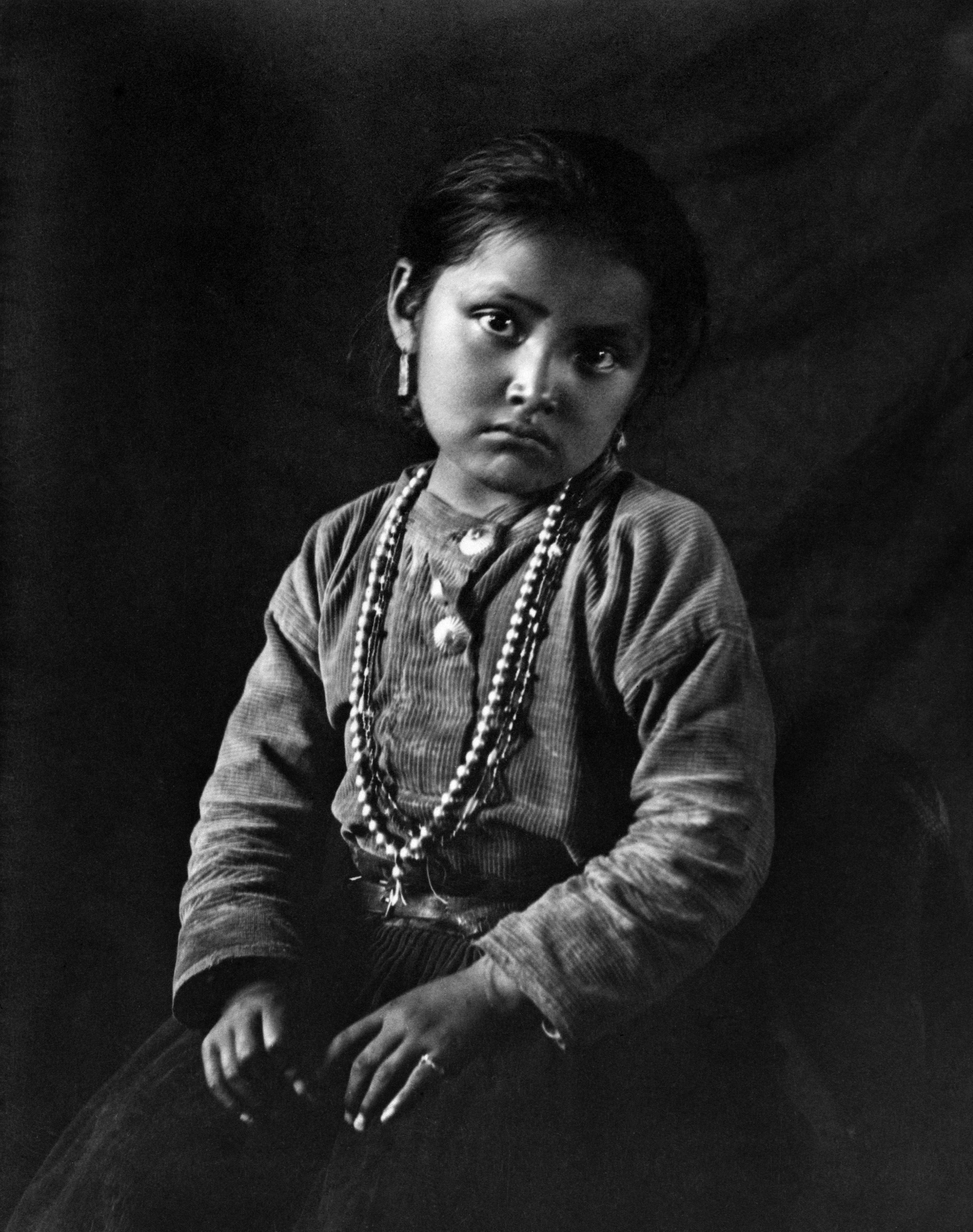
Karl Moon, Little Maid of the Desert, 1914

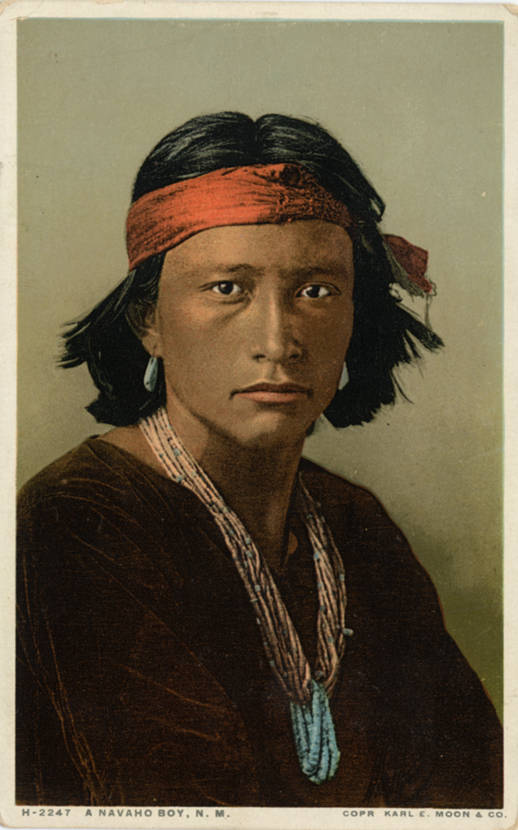
A Navaho Boy, N.M., Karl E. Moon & Co., Fred Harvey series (Phostint postcard, front)

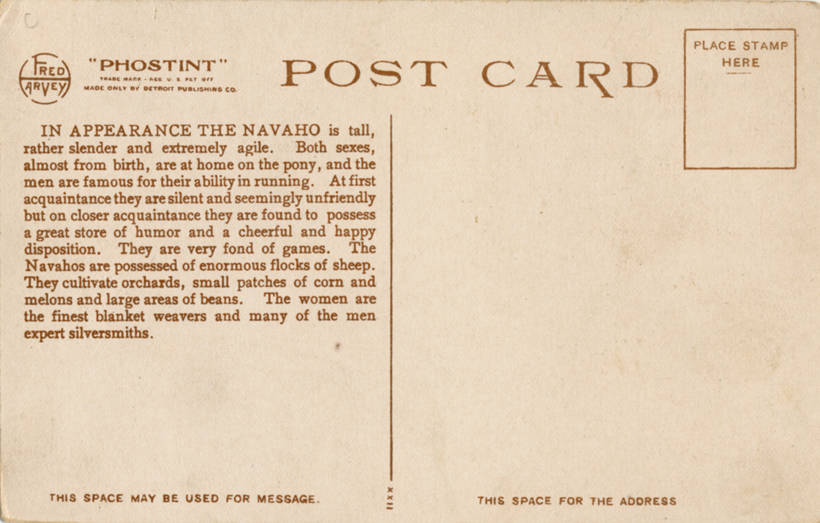
A Navaho Boy, N.M., Karl E. Moon & Co., Fred Harvey series (Phostint postcard, back)

Color postcards featuring Moon's images were printed by the Detroit Publishing Co. (DPC) via the Phostint process in which black and white photos were "colorized". Each color was printed separately; anywhere from eight to twenty different colors were required per card. Harvey ordered hundreds of thousands of DPC Phostints to sell in his hotel gift shops alongside the Native American jewelry, blankets and baskets he commissioned from local artisans.

During the same time frame, Moon also sold photos to major companies such as Stetson Hats and Wells Fargo for use in advertisements, calendars and logos.

In addition to his photographic duties at The Harvey Co., Moon served as the director of art. In this position, he assisted Harvey and the American Museum of Natural History in acquiring paintings of Indians.

He also collected Indian prints for the Library of Congress and the Montclair Museum.

== Later career ==
On June 5, 1911, Moon married American children's author Grace Purdie in St. Joseph, Missouri. After their marriage, they lived together at El Tovar studio. She shared his interest in the tribes of the American Southwest. The couple traveled together throughout the region, including Hopiland, Taos Pueblo and the Navajo Nation, carrying little gear and relying on trading posts for food. During these forays, they observed the customs and culture of the indigenous people.

In 1914, Moon resigned from The Fred Harvey Co. The couple moved to Pasadena, California. From 1917 until his death in 1948, they collaborated on nearly two dozen children's books with Native American themes. He co-wrote and illustrated. The first book Indian Legends in Rhyme was inspired by Grace Moon's letters to her future husband, written in verse.

In order of publication the books are:

- Indian Legends in Rhyme (1917)
- Lost Indian Magic (1918)
- Wongo and the Wise Old Crow (1923)
- Chi-Wee, The Adventures of a Little Indian Girl (1925)
- Chi-Wee and Loki of the Desert (1926)
- Nadita-(Little Nothing) (1927)
- The Flaming Arrow (1927)
- The Runaway Papoose (1928)
- The Magic Trail (1929)
- The Missing Kachina (1930)
- The Arrow of Tee-May (1931)
- Painted Moccasin (1931)
- The Book of Nah-Wee (1932)
- Far-Away Desert (1932)
- Tah-Kee The Boy from Nowhere (1932)
- Shanty Ann (1935)
- Singing Sands (1936)
- White Indian (1937)
- Solita (1938)
- Daughter of Thunder (1942)
- One Little Indian (1950)

Runaway Papoose won a Newbery Medal in 1929.

Moon continued to make photographs and paintings at the Pasadena studio. He painted 24 Indian studies for Henry E. Huntington, four for the Otto Vollbehr collection in Charlottenburg, Germany, and 26 oil paintings of Southwest Indians for the Smithsonian Institution. In 1924, Moon began work on Indians of the Southwest, a four-volume atlas-folio set containing one hundred of his best photographs. It was finally published in 1936, but only ten copies were ever printed.

Moon died at the home of his daughter in 1948.

== Legacy ==
Critics have noted that "despite most white settlers insensitive attitude towards Native Americans, Moon's photos and paintings evince a deep empathy towards his subjects".

In 1914, Moon wrote an article for Leslie's Illustrated Weekly Newspaper, in which he explained his photographic objective and approach.

Many men have, with camera and brush, attempted to picture the American Indian...Among those who have made a serious study of their work there are two classes; the men who use the picturesque Red Man and his surroundings as models and materials for their art; and those who give the ethnological value of their work first consideration and use their knowledge of art as a medium for carefully making dependable pictorial records. My work, and the intent that is back of it, place me in the latter class.

— Carl Moon, Photographing the Vanishing Red Man

And later in the same article:

I am frequently asked how I get my pictures...There are difficulties in approaching the Indian which may be overcome only by time and diplomacy. I would say that unlimited patience and tact...are the essential qualifications of the Indian artist. One must get the Indian’s point of view before he can hope to understand him, and he must understand him if he is to truthfully portray him.

In a joint biography of the Moons, In Search of the Wild Indians: Photographs & Life Works by Carl and Grace Moon, author Tom Dreibe offers the highest praise for the artist, "Perhaps if his travels had led him West ten years earlier, he may have been considered the greatest Indian photographer of all time".

=== Collections ===
Moon's artwork is in the collections of Hubbell Trading Post, Huntington Library, Montclair Art Museum, Southwest Museum of the American Indian, Library of Congress, American Museum of Natural History, The Getty Museum, the Smithsonian American Art Museum and the Metropolitan Museum of Art, among others.

The Huntington Library holds the largest collection, the 24 oil paintings made specifically for Henry Huntington and 293 photographic prints purchased by the collector.
