= 7th Avenue West Incline Railway =

Seventh Avenue West Incline
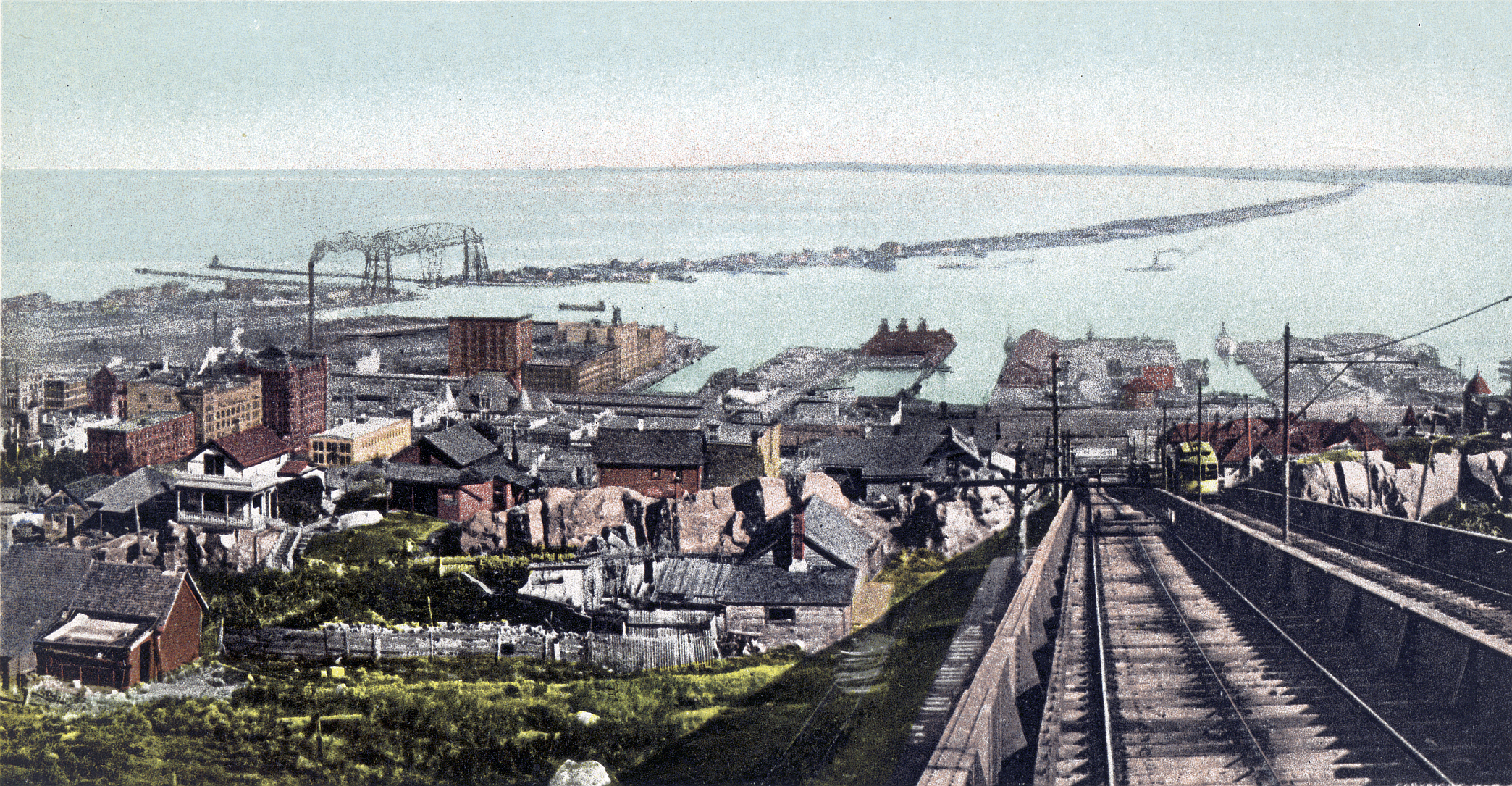
- Detroit Publishing Company postcard view from the incline, c. 1907

Overview
- Locale: Duluth, Minnesota, United States

Service
- Operator(s): Duluth Street Railway Company

History
- Opened: 1891
- Closed: September 4, 1939

Technical
- Line length: .5 miles (0.80 km)

The Seventh Avenue West Incline ran in Duluth, Minnesota, from 1891 until 1939, when the tracks were sold for scrap for the war effort.

== History ==
The incline railway was opened on Seventh Avenue West because the hillside was too steep for a regular rail line. It was built by the Duluth Street Railway Company which had received a charter from the state in 1881 to build a streetcar line for Duluth.

The incline climbed 509 feet in slightly over half a mile, with a grade ranging from 15 to 25%. Two forty-one by fifteen-foot cars counterbalanced each other with one ascending while the other descended. The cars were built to accommodate up to 250 standing passengers, and was powered by a stationary steam engine at the top. A trip one-way took 16 minutes.

Early ridership did not live up to expectations. Still, the railway company opened the Beacon Hill pavilion at the top of the incline on July 4, 1892. The pavilion, also known as the Hilltop Amusement Hall and the Incline Pavilion), had a restaurant and theatre, and hosted events such as hot air balloon launches, some of which attracted up to 5,000 people.

On May 28, 1901, a fire broke out in the powerhouse engine room and burned the pavilion, melting the cable and releasing a flaming car down the incline. No one was hurt in the incident. Service resumed on January 1, 1902, now with only a single vehicle balanced by a counterweight, and with electric motors instead of a steam engine. However, in 1911, the railway updated the Incline with two new cars, raised and lowered by an electric hoist.

In 1925, the Incline carried an average of 2,170 weekday passengers, travelling downhill in the morning and uphill in the afternoon. The railway was never profitable, but was the last remnant of the streetcar system to be replaced by buses. The last day of operation was September 4, 1939.

Today, a stairway remains. In 2025, it was designated as the "Duluth Incline Stairway Trail", a local recreational hiking trail with four interpretive signs about the railway. Several streetcars and the old headquarters still exist in Duluth.

== Statistics ==
- Length: .5 miles (0.80 km)
- Elevation: 500 feet (150 m)
- Time: 15 minutes (bottom to top)
- Fare: $0.15
  ($5.00 in 2024 dollars)

== See also ==
- Duluth Belt Line Railway
- List of funicular railways
