= The Runaway Papoose =

1928 children's novel by Grace Moon

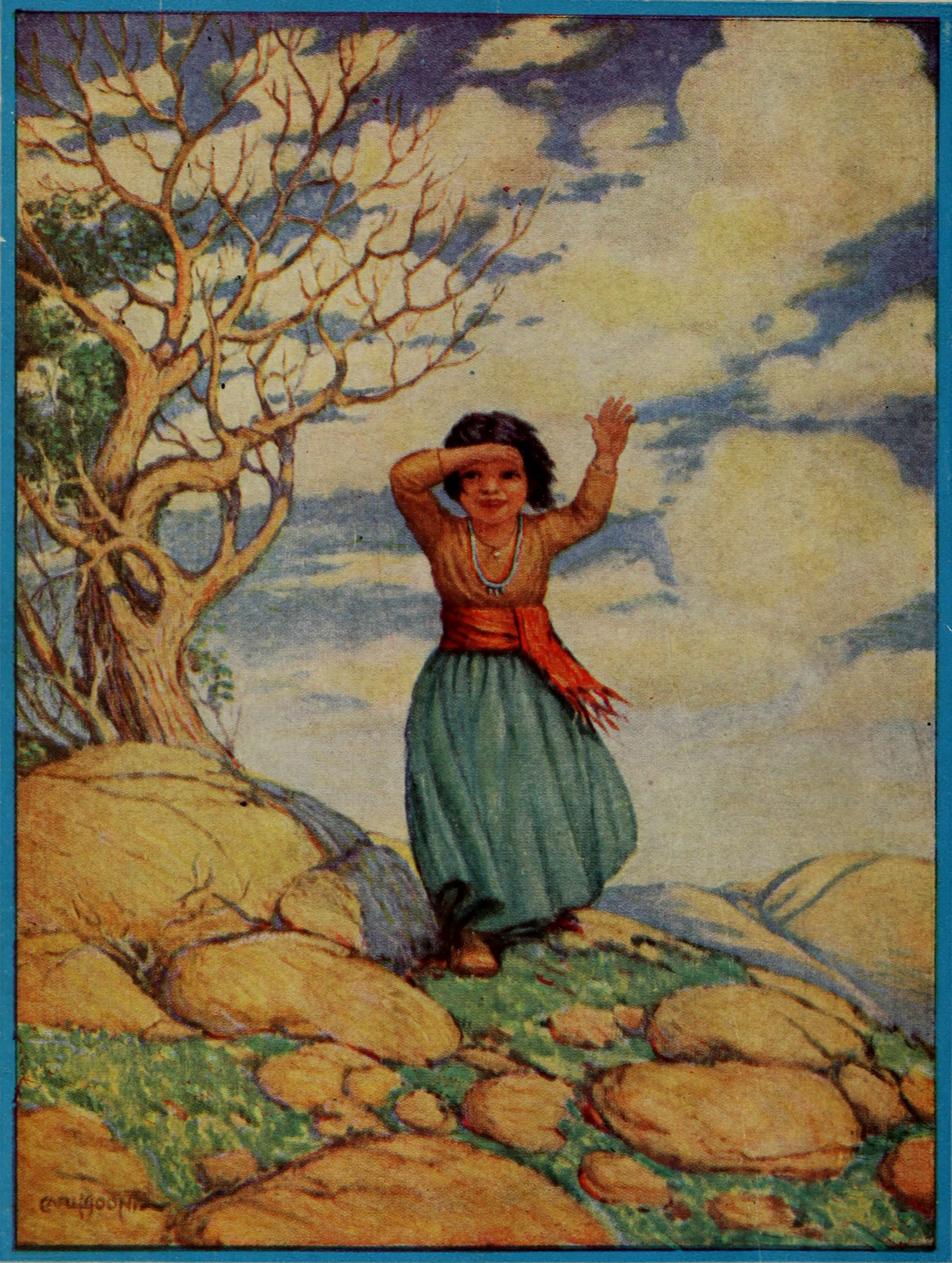
- Frontispiece from The Runaway Papoose, illustrated by Carl Moon.
- Author: Grace Moon
- Illustrator: Carl Moon
- Language: English
- Genre: Children's literature
- Publisher: Doubleday
- Publication date: 1928
- Publication place: United States
- Pages: 264

The Runaway Papoose is a 1928 children's novel written by Grace Moon and illustrated by her husband Carl Moon. It is a contemporary story of Native American children from the southwestern United States. It was designated a 1929 Newbery Honor Book.

== Plot ==
Nah-tee, a four-year-old Pueblo girl, runs away from her family's camp during an attack by outlaws. She meets a Navajo shepherd boy named Moyo, who agrees to help her find her family; after many adventures, they arrive at a large regional powwow where Nah-tee is reunited with her family.
