= Sauerwein =

Sauerwein is a German surname, 'sauer' means 'sour'. Notable people with the surname include:

- Johann Wilhelm Sauerwein (1803-1847), German author, journalist, and professor
- Elinor Sauerwein (1914–2010), American philanthropist
- Frank Paul Sauerwein (1871–1910), American painter
- Georg Sauerwein (1831–1904), German publisher, polyglot, poet, and linguist
