= Grace Moon =

American novelist

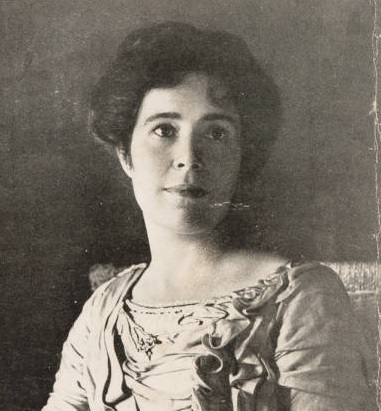
- Born: February 5, 1884
- Died: 1947 (aged 62–63)
- Occupation: Writer
- Writing career
- Genre: Children's literature
- Notable work: Runaway Papoose

Grace Moon (1884–1947) was an American children's author, publishing many works on Native American themes. Her most notable work was Runaway Papoose, which won a Newbery Honor in 1929.

== Biography ==
She was born Grace Purdie in Indianapolis on February 5, 1884.

She received her education from the University of Wisconsin, National Academy of Design, New York and the Art Institute of Chicago. She spent several years in Europe and explored Aztec ruins in Mexico with her father. Her "bringing out" party was as the American Legation in Buenos Aires. In 1911 she married Carl Moon, a painter and photographer of the American Indian. Carl worked at El Tovar Studio in the Grand Canyon from 1911 until they moved to Pasadena in 1914. The couple had two children Francis-Maxwell and Mary. They collaborated on 22 children's books on the Pueblos and Navajos with Carl illustrating some of them.

== Selected works ==
- Indian Legends in Rhyme - 1917
- Lost Indian Magic: A Mystery Story of the Red Man as He Lived Before the White Men Came – 1918
- Wongo and the Wise Old Crow - 1923
- Chi-Wee, The Adventures of a Little Indian Girl – 1925
- Chi-Wee and Loki of the Desert - 1926
- Nadita (Little Nothing) - 1927
- Runaway Papoose – 1928
- The Magic Trail – 1929
- The Missing Katchina - 1930
- The Arrow of Teemay - 1930
- Far-away Desert - 1932
- Book of Nah-Wee - 1932
- Shanty Ann - 1935
- Singing Sands - 1936
- White Indian - 1937, "The story is well-paced and not too far-fetched."
- Solita -1938, "Grace Moon has established a reputation for this type of story, and though there is no particular distinction to this one, it is good routine story-adventure against a Mexican background."
- Daughter of Thunder - 1942, "All Moon books give accurate pictures of Navajo life, showing various customs such as the Rain Dance."
- One Little Indian - 1950
