= Duluth Belt Line Railway =

Minnesota transportation infrastructure (1890–1916)

Overview
- Locale: Duluth, Minnesota, United States
- Termini: N 61st Avenue W and Grand Avenue; N 77th Avenue W and Vinland Street

History
- Opened: July 8, 1890
- Closed: 1916

Technical
- Line length: 3 miles (4.83 km)

The Duluth Beltline Railway, also known as the "West Duluth Incline" or the "Bay View Incline", was first operated in 1889 and operated as a one-car operation until 1892. The Duluth News Tribune wrote an article on May 8, 1890 and called the railway "the longest of its kind in the world." The line had several stations along the route including between Bayview Heights and the Marinette/Iron Bay Works, and on Central Avenue where it met the streetcar tracks.

== Statistics ==
- Length: 3 miles (4.8 km)
- Elevation: 600 feet (180 m)
- Time: 24 minutes (bottom to top)
- Fare: $0.15
  ($5.00 in 2024 dollars)

== See also ==
- 7th Avenue West Incline Railway
- List of funicular railways
