= Otto Vollbehr =

German chemist, book collector, and propagandist (1869–1946)

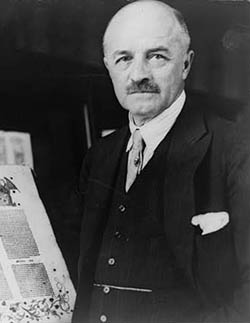
Vollbehr standing next to a rare volume of printers' bookmarks which he donated to the Library of Congress, c. 1928

Otto Heinrich Friedrich Vollbehr (April 24, 1869 – May 18, 1946) was a German chemist, book collector, and Nazi propagandist.

== Biography ==
Vollbehr was born in Kiel, the son of Emil and Caroline Vollbehr. He studied chemistry at the University of Marburg and Berlin. In 1897, he travelled to San Francisco, where he was described as "a noted pharmacist" Here Vollbehr claimed to have met Adolph Sutro, who advised him on building a rare book collection. By 1914, he was the chairman of a chemical company, allowing him to make a fortune during World War I.

In November 1924, Vollbehr traveled to Los Angeles, where he sold a collection of 392 incunabula to Henry E. Huntington for $170,000. In March 1925, Huntington purchased another collection of 1,740 incunabula from Vollbehr, for the price of $770,000.

In 1930, the Library of Congress purchased 3000 incunabula from Vollbehr, for the price of $1,500,000. This purchase included a Gutenberg Bible, one of only three copies printed on vellum. As a result of these sales to Huntington and the Library of Congress, Vollbehr has been described as "the most important source of fifteenth-century books now in America".

Vollbehr sold another 1036 books in 1936. The book dealer Israel Perlstein bought many of the books and offered the collection to the Library of Congress, but the Library rejected the condition as overpriced. Perlstein later described Vollbehr's sale as "a confidence scheme". (Perlstein eventually sold the books to Gimbel Brothers department store, for a fraction of their original price).

== Propaganda ==
Between 1931 and 1936, Vollbehr worked as a propagandist for Nazi Germany, issuing memoranda that attempted to influence American political opinion in favor of Germany. In November 1934, he testified in front of the House Committee on Un-American Activities about his writings. The hearings revealed that Vollbehr had spent most of the money from the Library of Congress on Nazi and anti-Semitic propaganda and he was accused by John W. McCormack of attempting "to incite American against American" In 1940, Burton Rascoe published an article in the Saturday Review titled "Uncle Sam Has a Book", criticizing the Library's purchase of the incunabula collection because of Vollbehr's work as a propagandist.
