= Photochrom =

Process of colorizing black-and-white photographs and subsequent printing

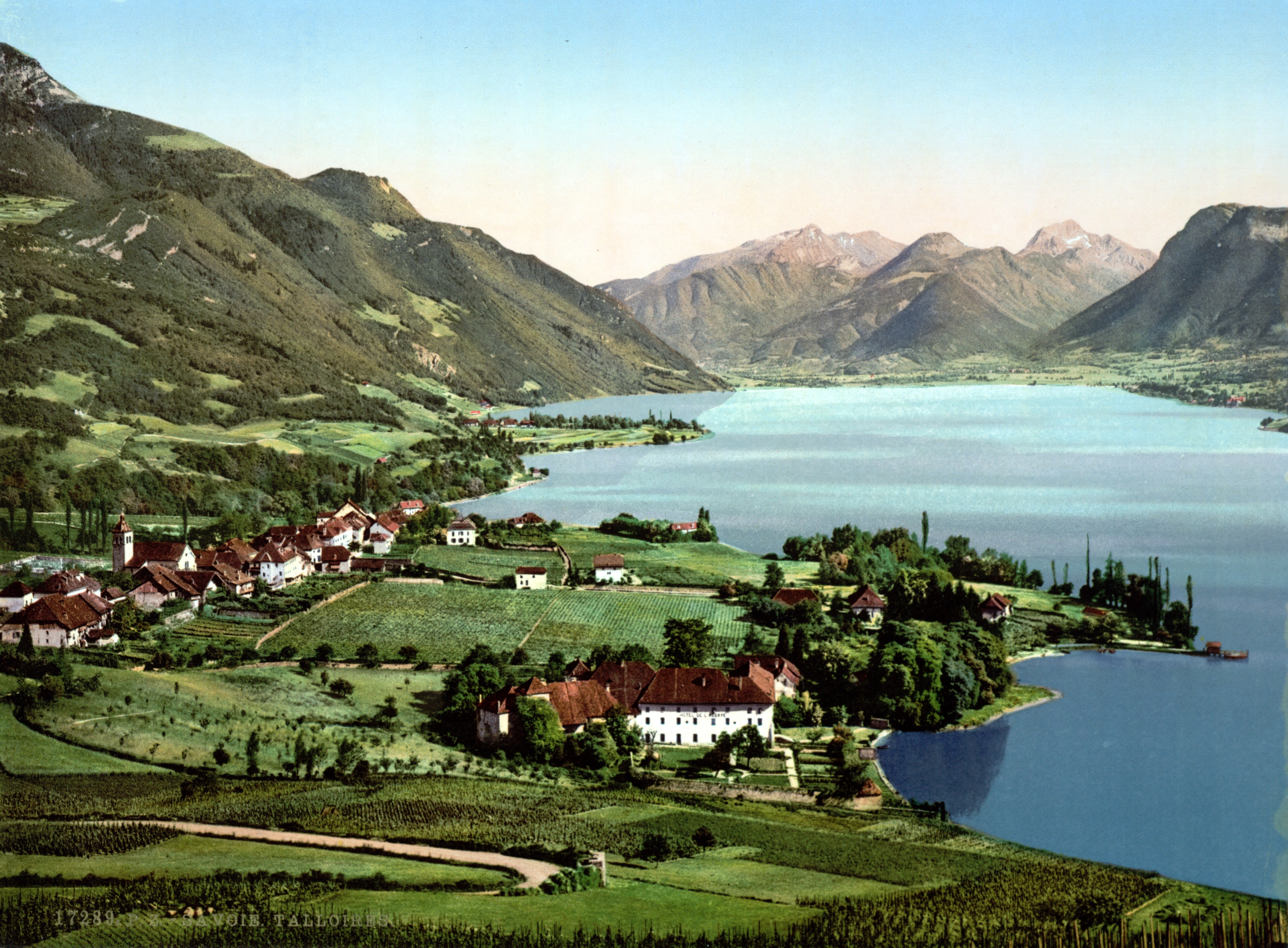
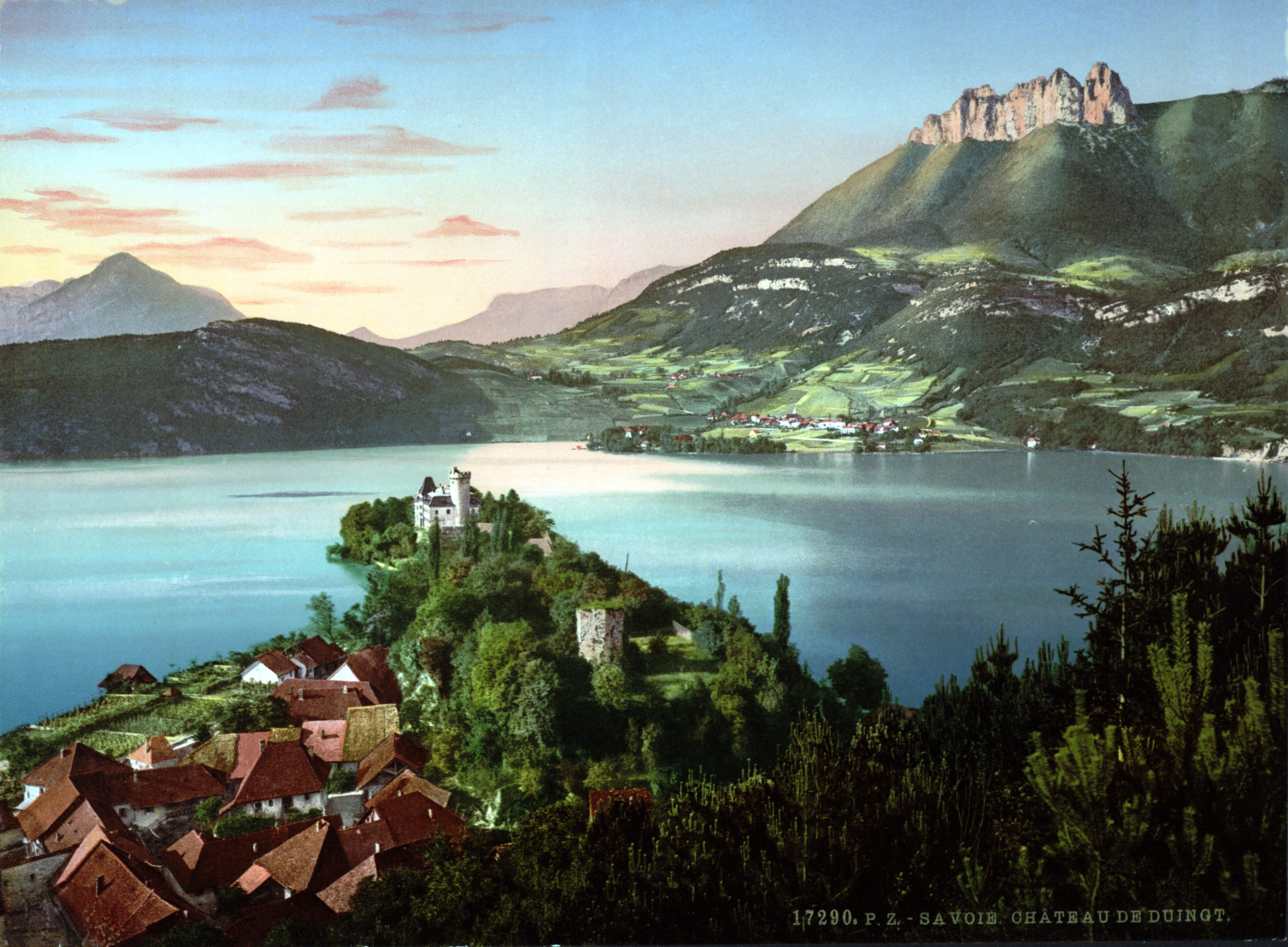
1890s photochrom prints of Lake Annecy in the French Alps

Photochrom, Photochrome, (Note: "Photochrom" (English: /ˈfoʊtəˌkroʊm, -toʊ-/) is the spelling used by the Library of Congress, for historical reasons, in its classification and description of its collection of such images. Variants of the spelling exist, both in English and in German. "Photochrome" is the English spelling used in some contexts, even by the Library of Congress in a few of its image descriptions. "Fotochrom" is the German spelling used today by Orell Füssli, the Swiss company that invented the process.) or Fotochrom is a process of colorizing from a single black-and-white negative with subsequent photographic transfer onto lithographic printing plates. The process is a photographic variant of chromolithography (color lithography). Because no color information was preserved in the photographic process, the photographer would make detailed notes on the colors within the scene and use the notes to transfer the image through colored gels onto the printing plates.

== History ==
The process was invented in the 1880s by Hans Jakob Schmid (1856–1924), an employee of the Swiss company Orell Gessner Füssli—a printing firm whose history began in the 16th century. Füssli founded the stock company Photochrom Zürich (later Photoglob Zürich AG) as the business vehicle for the commercial exploitation of the process and both Füssli and Photoglob continue to exist today. From the mid-1890s the process was licensed by other companies, including the Detroit Photographic Company in the US (making it the basis of their "phostint" process), and the Photochrom Company of London.

Amongst the first commercial photographers to employ the technique were French photographer Félix Bonfils, British photographer Francis Frith and American photographer William Henry Jackson, all active in the 1880s. The photochrom process was most popular in the 1890s, when true color photography was first developed but was still commercially impractical.

In 1898, the US Congress passed the Private Mailing Card Act which let private publishers produce postcards. These could be mailed for one cent each, while the letter rate was two cents. Publishers created thousands of photochrom prints, usually of cities or landscapes, and sold them as postcards. In this format, photochrom reproductions became popular. The Detroit Photographic Company reportedly produced as many as seven million photochrom prints in some years, and ten to thirty thousand different views were offered.

After World War I, which ended the craze for collecting photochrom postcards, the chief use of the process was for posters and art reproductions. The last photochrom printer operated up to 1970.

== Process ==
A tablet of lithographic limestone called a "litho stone" is coated with a light-sensitive surface composed of a thin layer of purified bitumen dissolved in benzene. A reversed halftone negative is hand colored according to the sketch and notes taken at the scene, then pressed against the coating and exposed to daylight through gel filters, causing the bitumen to harden in proportion to the amount of light passing through each portion of the negative. This will take ten to thirty minutes in summer and up to several hours in winter. A solvent such as turpentine is applied to remove the unhardened bitumen. The plate can be retouched to adjust the tonal scale, strengthening or softening tones as required. The image becomes imprinted on the stone in bitumen. Each tint is applied using a separate stone that bears the appropriate retouched image. The finished prints are produced using at least six, but more commonly ten to fifteen, tint stones.

== Gallery ==
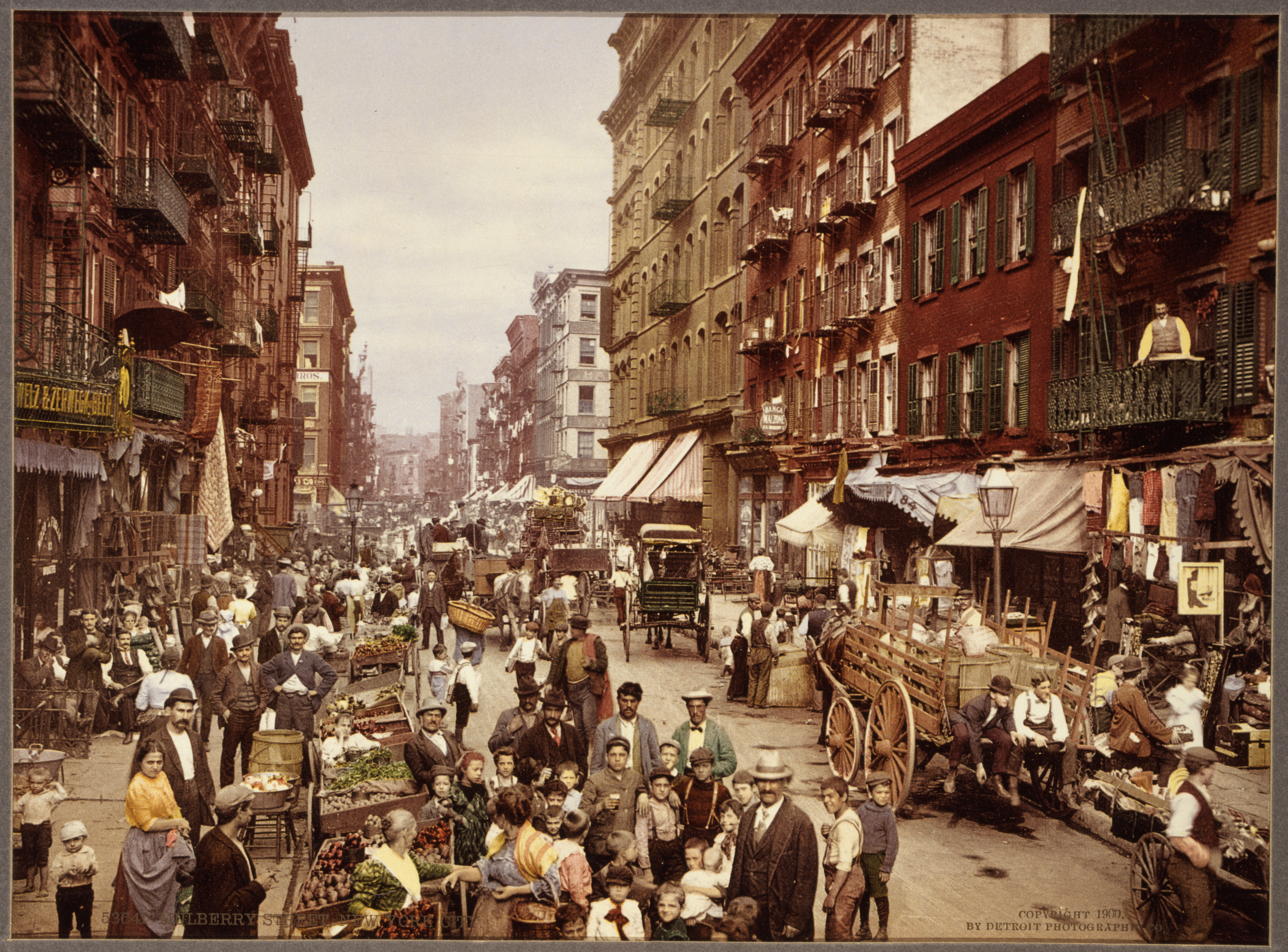
A photochrom of Mulberry Street in New York City c. 1900, which shows the evocative coloration characteristic of the process

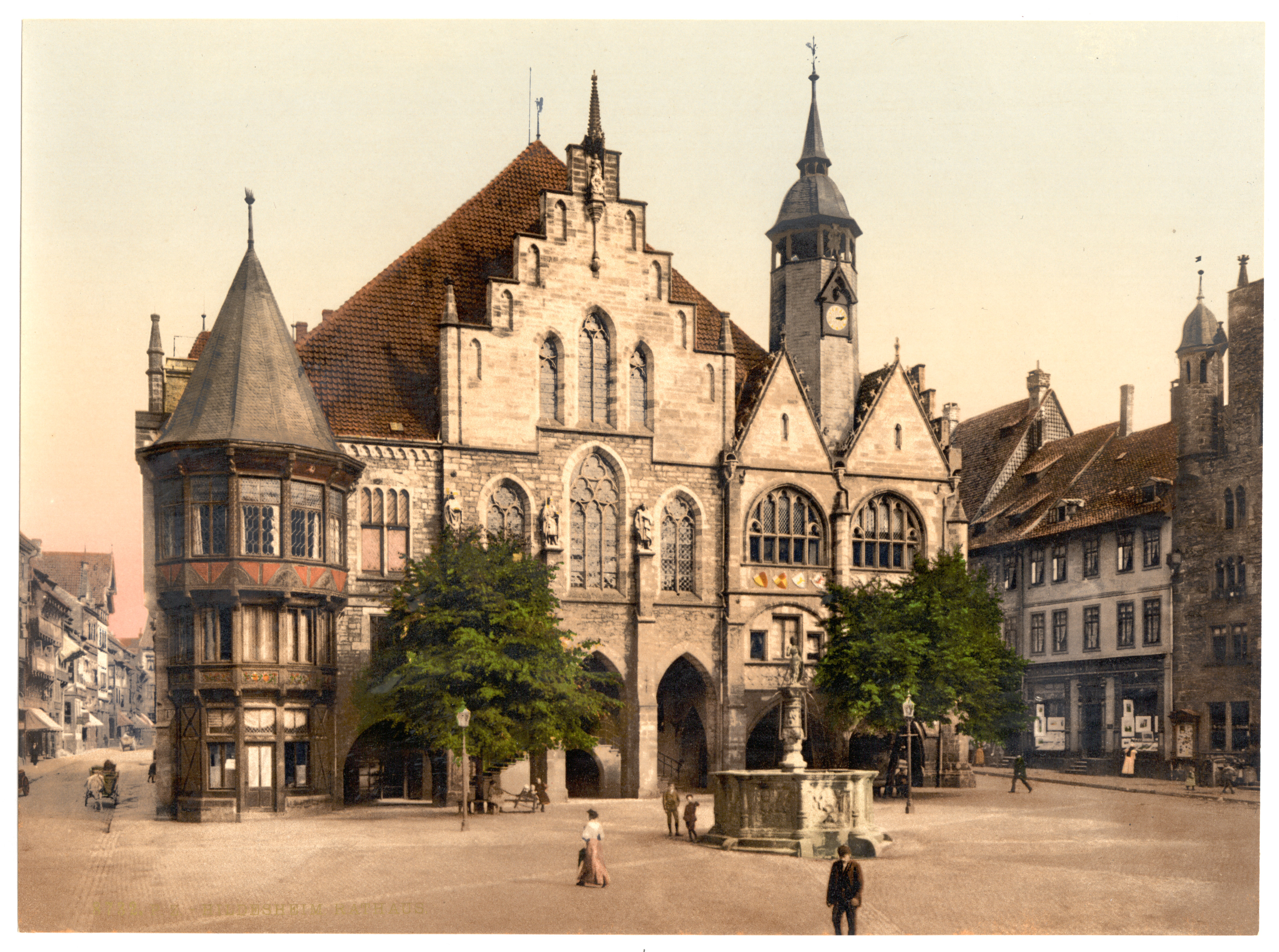
A photochrom of Hildesheim town hall in Germany, c. 1890s, using fewer color plates

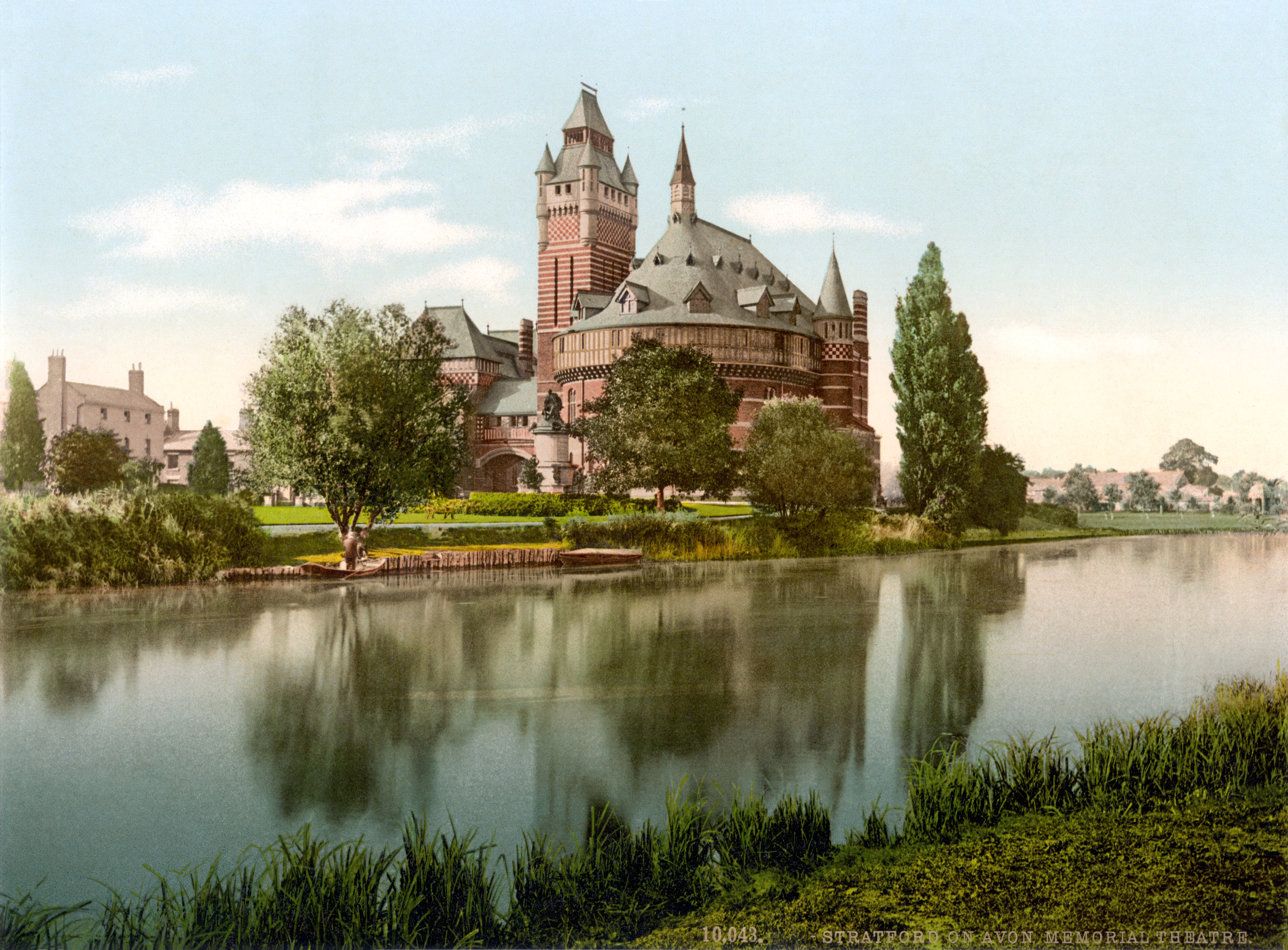
Photochrom of the old Shakespeare Memorial Theatre, Stratford-on-Avon, England, c. 1890–1900

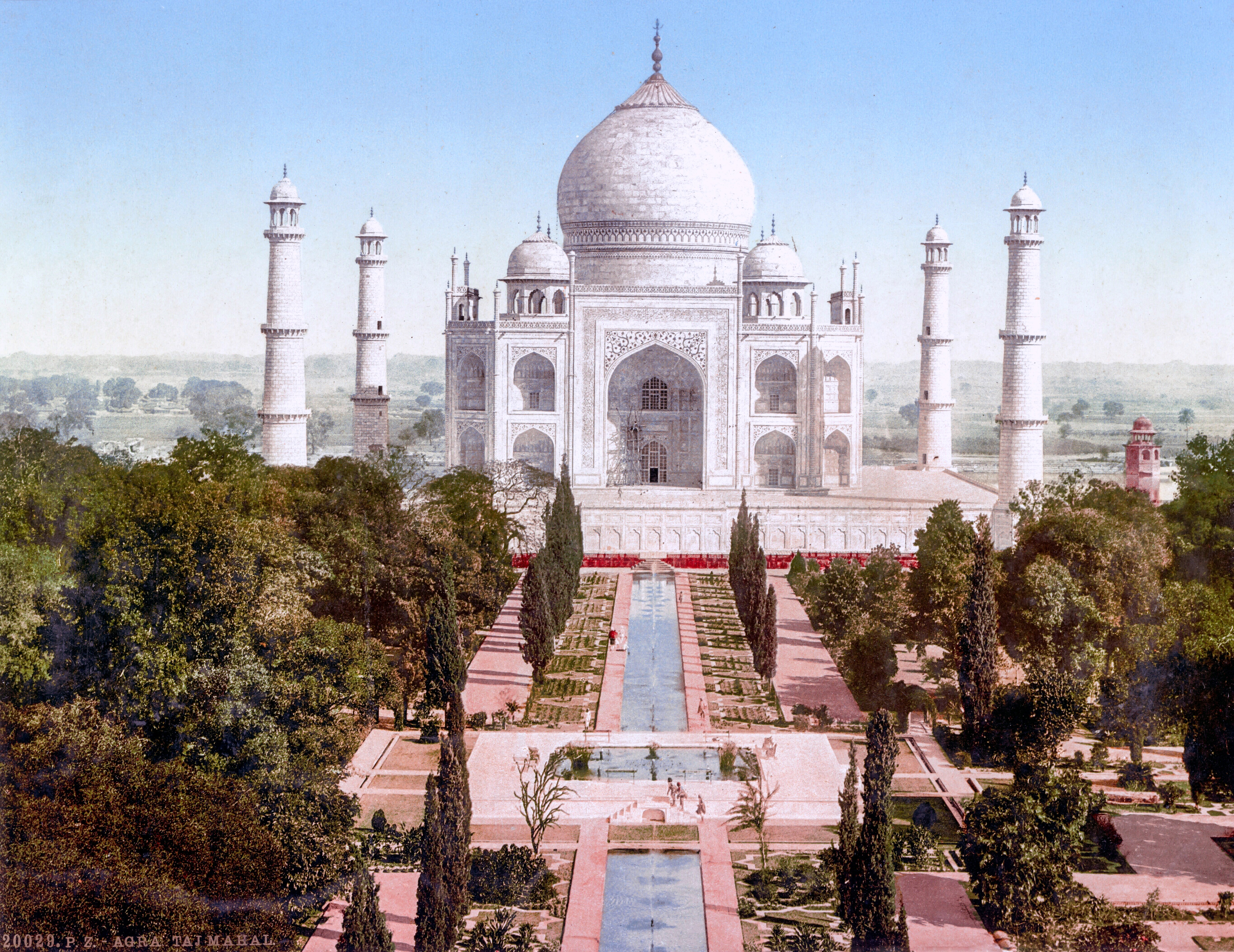
Photochrom of the Taj Mahal at Agra, India, c. 1890–1900

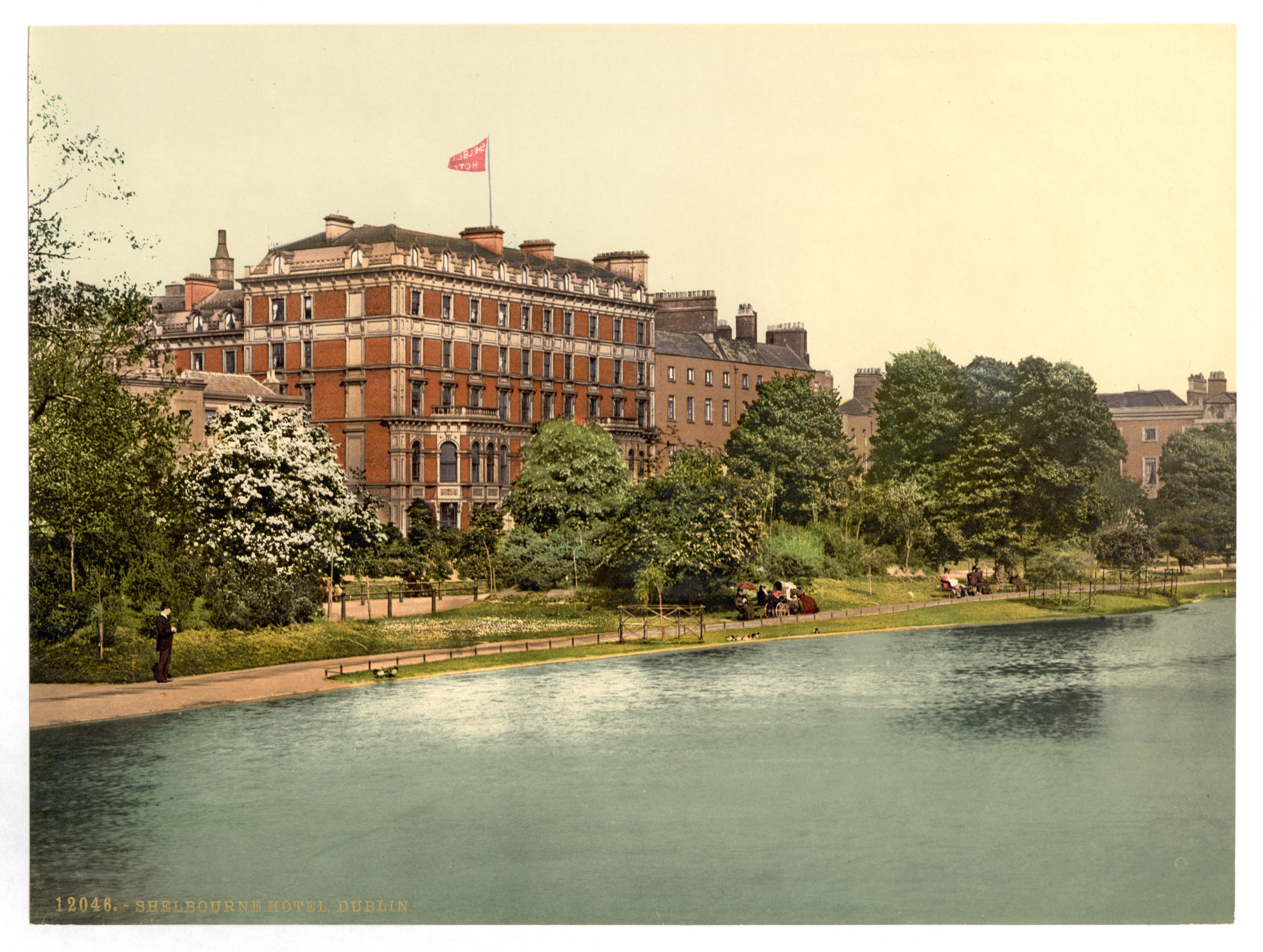
A photochrom print of Shelbourne Hotel, c. 1900

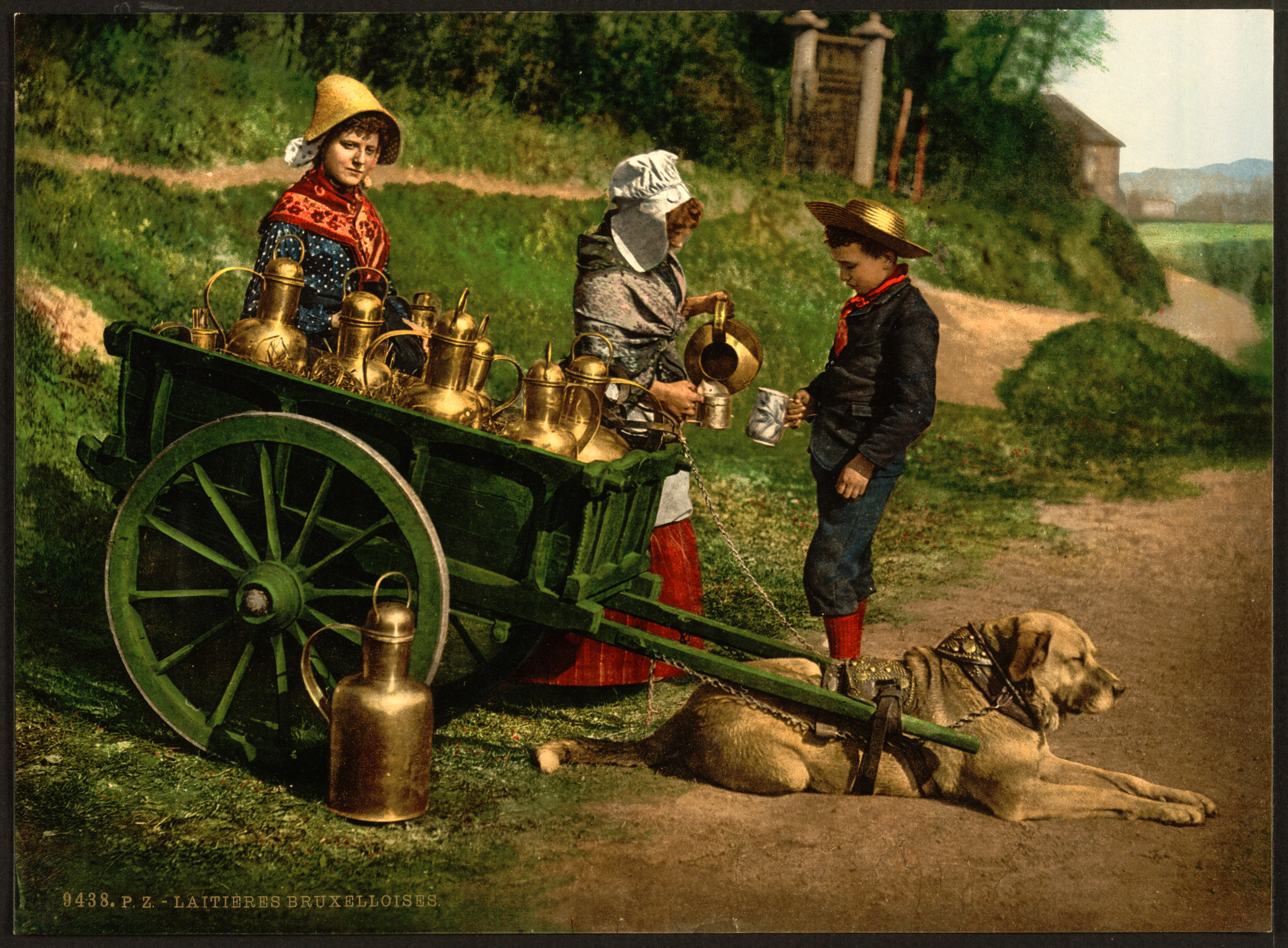
A photochrom of Belgian milk peddlers with a dogcart, c. 1890–1900

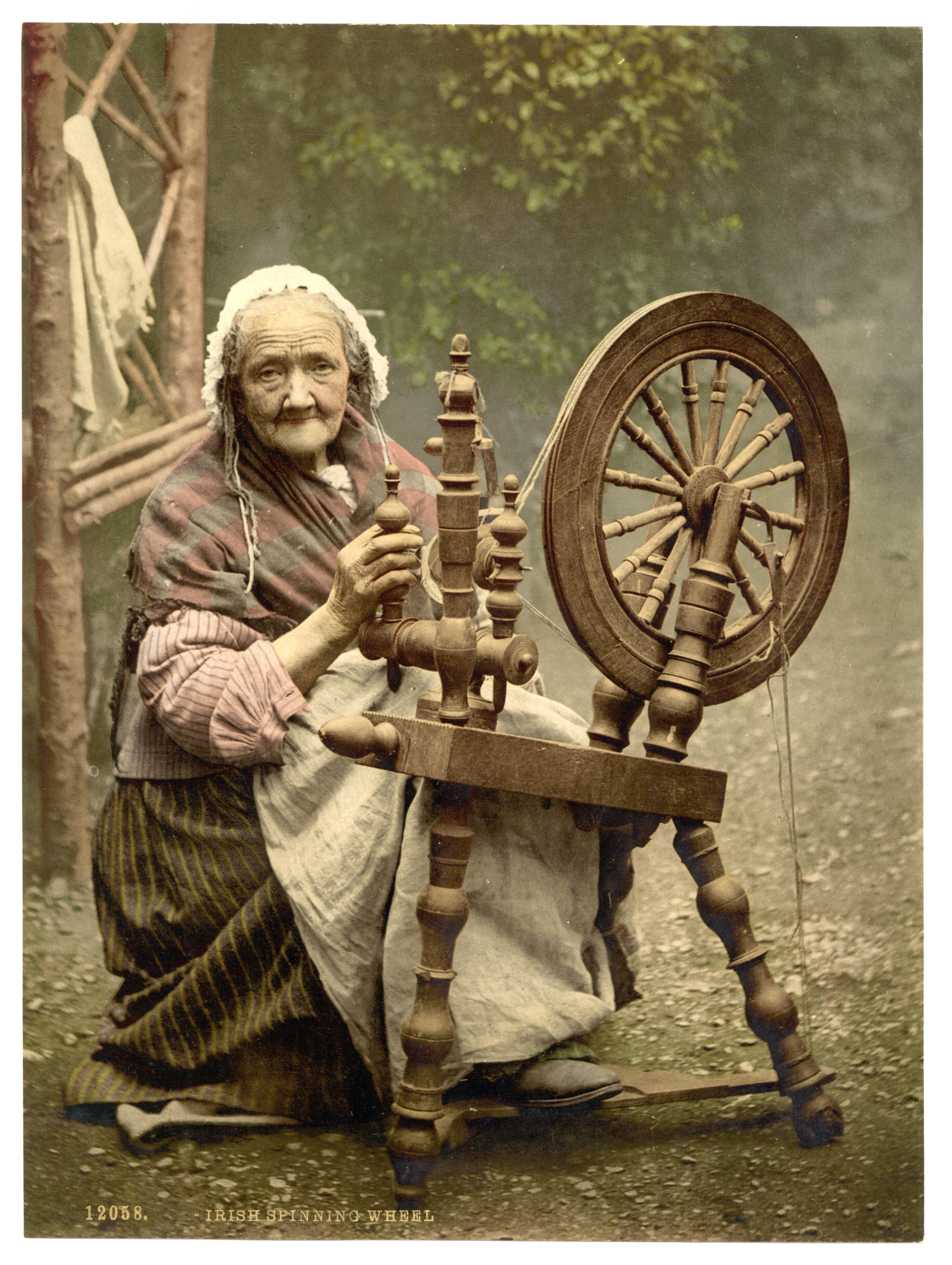
A photochrom of an elderly Irish woman using a spinning wheel, County Galway, Ireland, c. 1890s

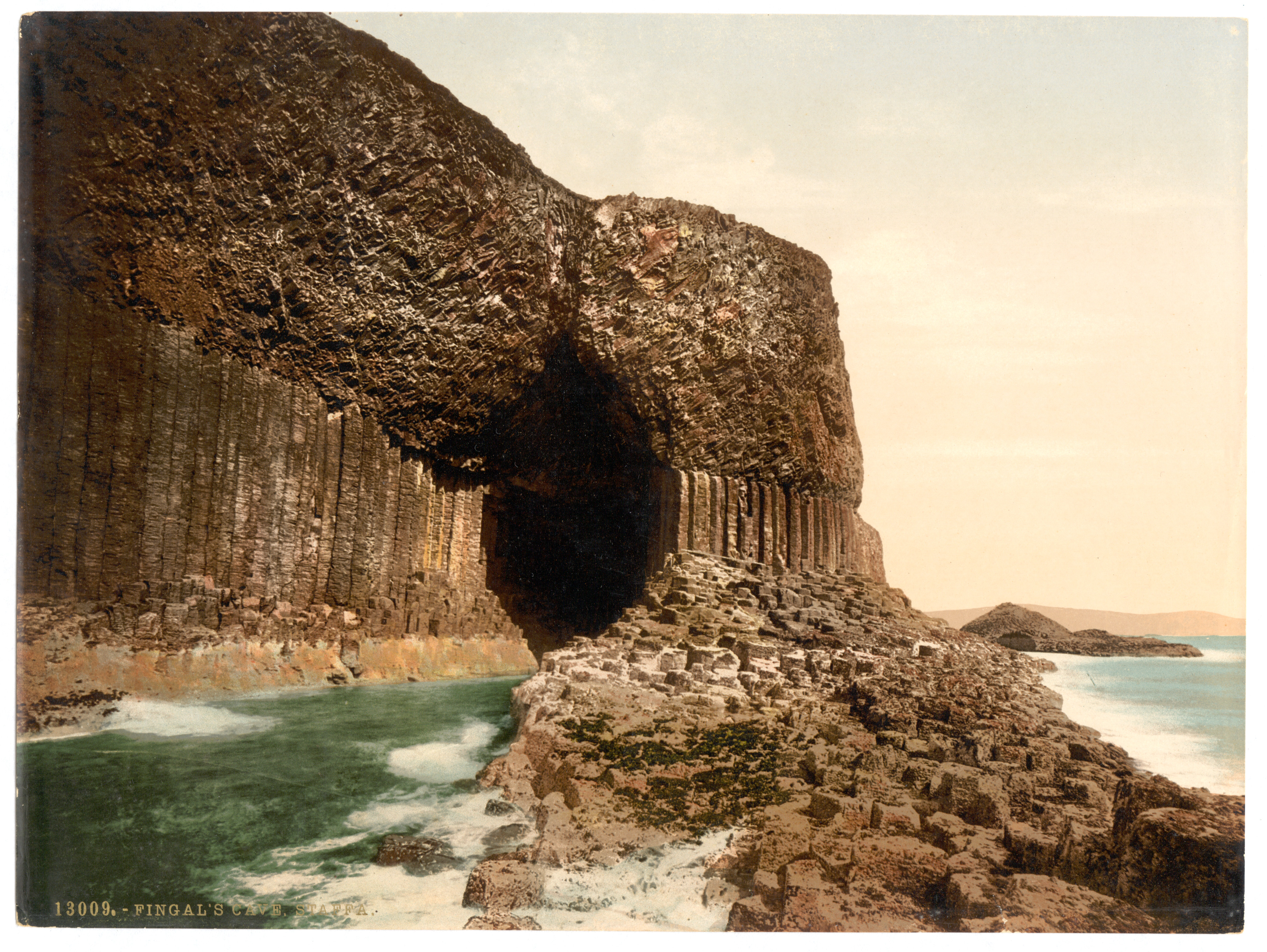
Entrance to Fingal's Cave near low tide, 1900

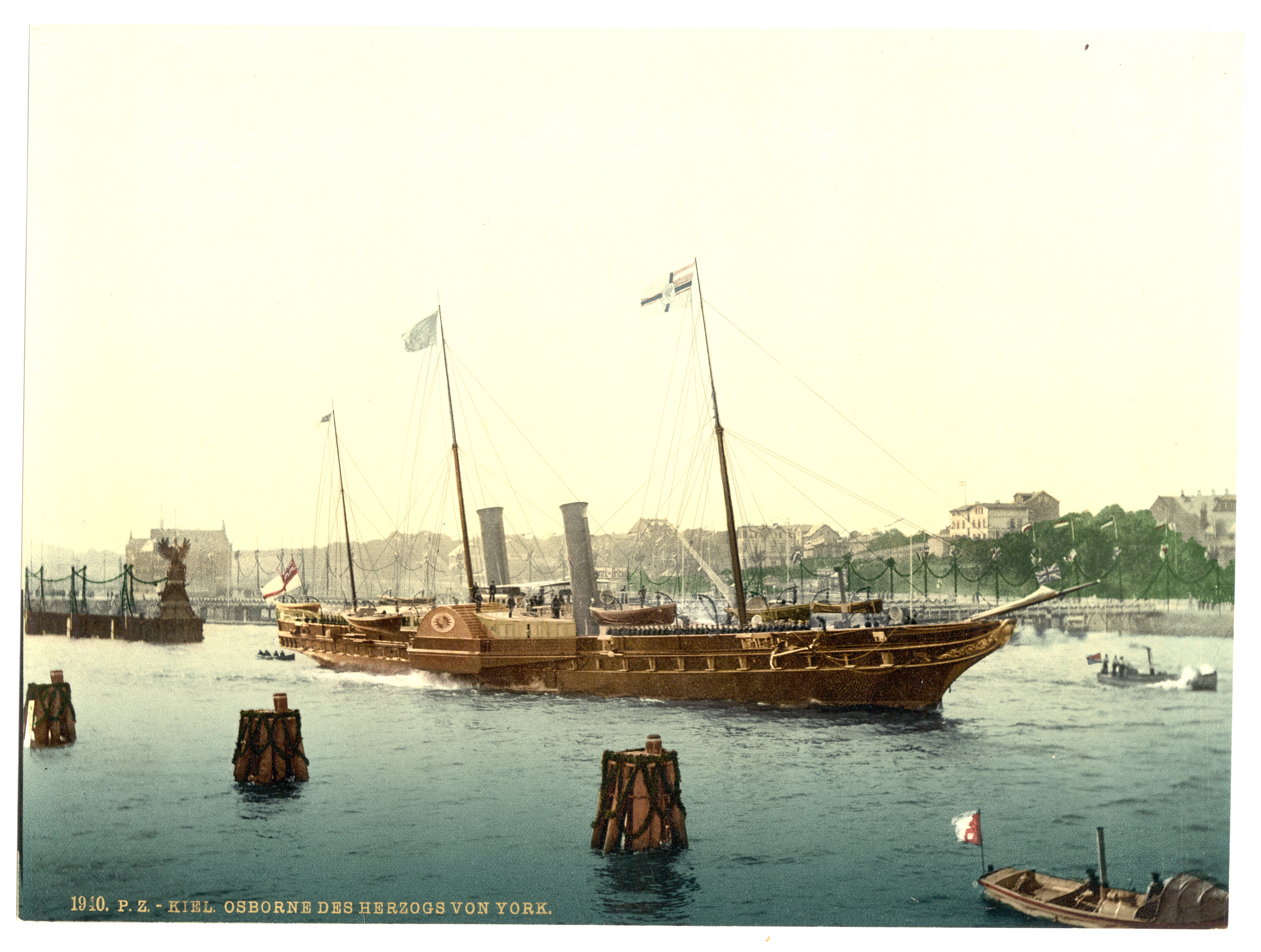
HMY Osborne photochrom print, c. 1895

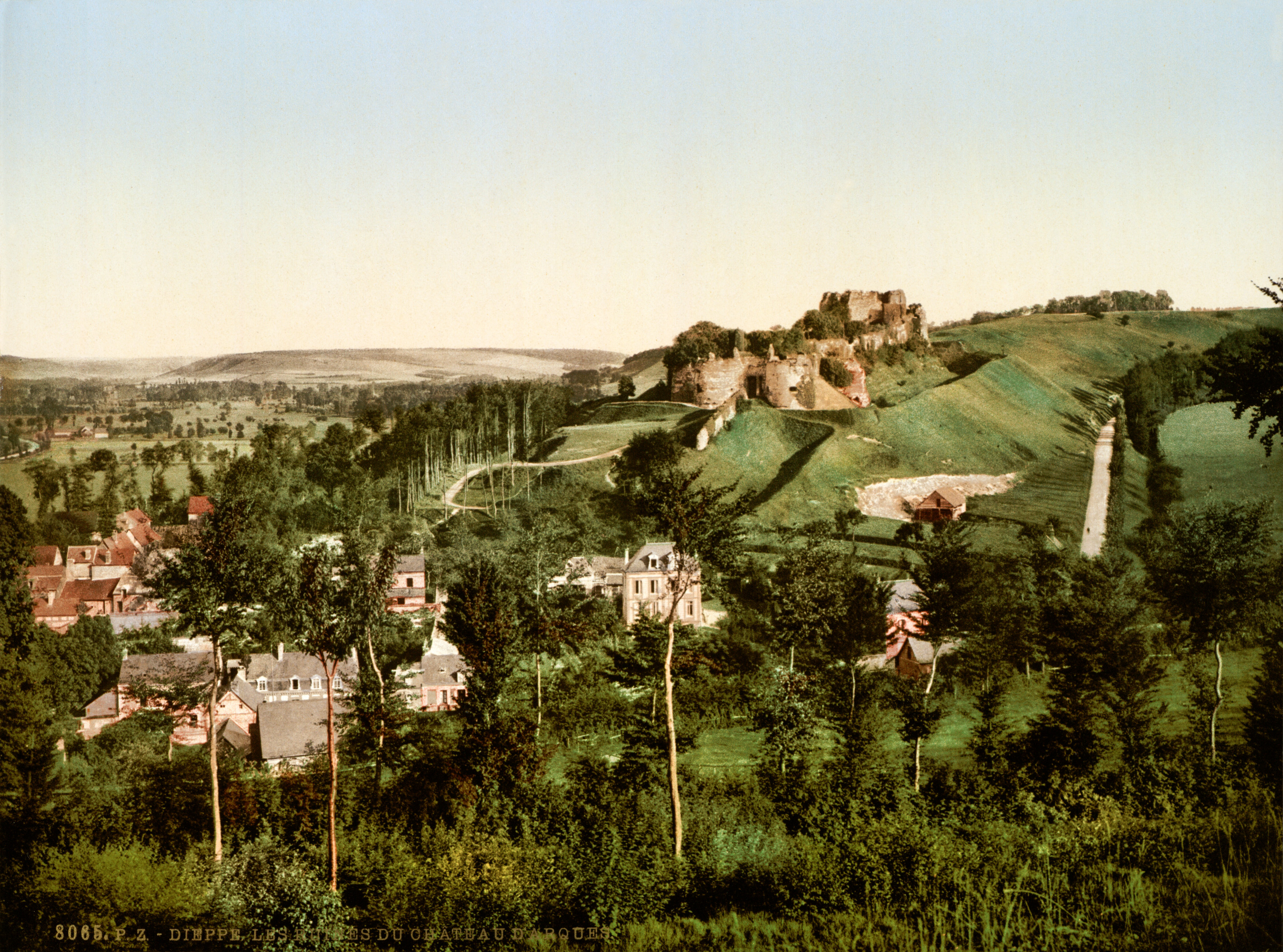
Ruins of the Castle of Arques, near Dieppe, France, c. 1895

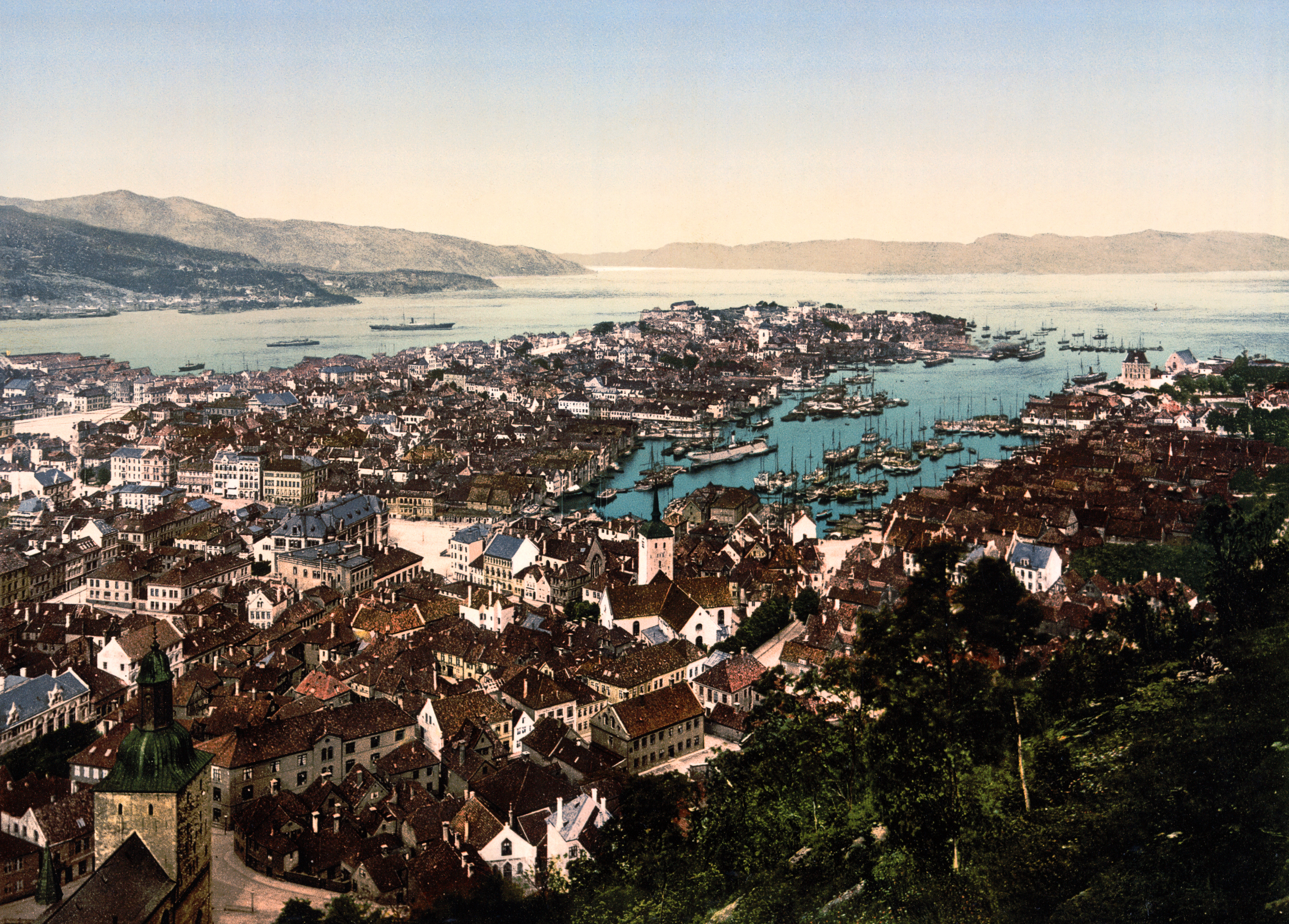
Bergen, Norway, c. 1890s. Visible are Bergen Cathedral in the bottom left side, Holy Cross Church in the middle, the bay (Vågen) and the Bergenhus Fortress to the right of the opening of Vågen.

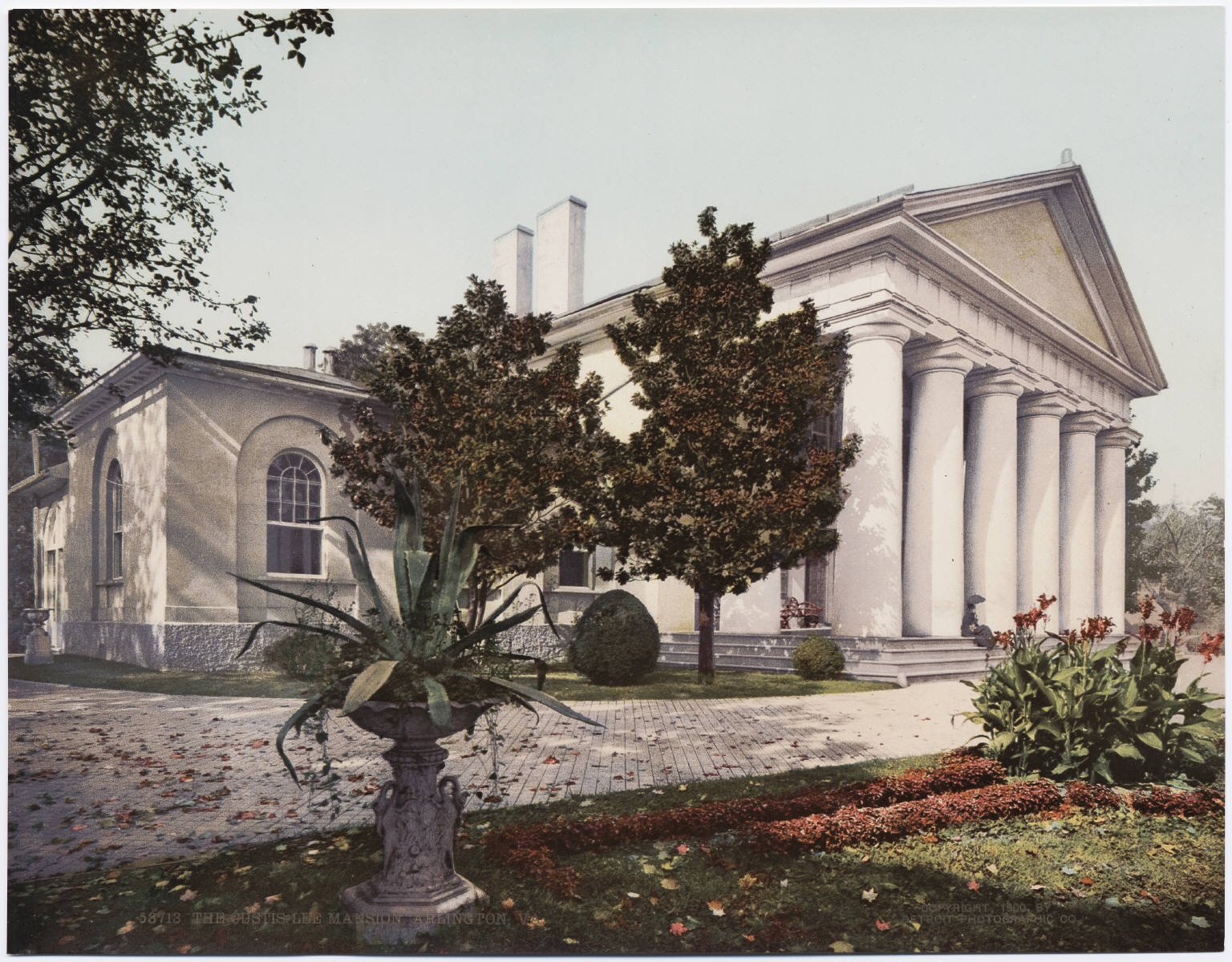
A photochrom print of Arlington House, The Robert E. Lee Memorial, in Arlington National Cemetery, Virginia, U.S., c. 1897–1924 (Detroit Photographic Company)

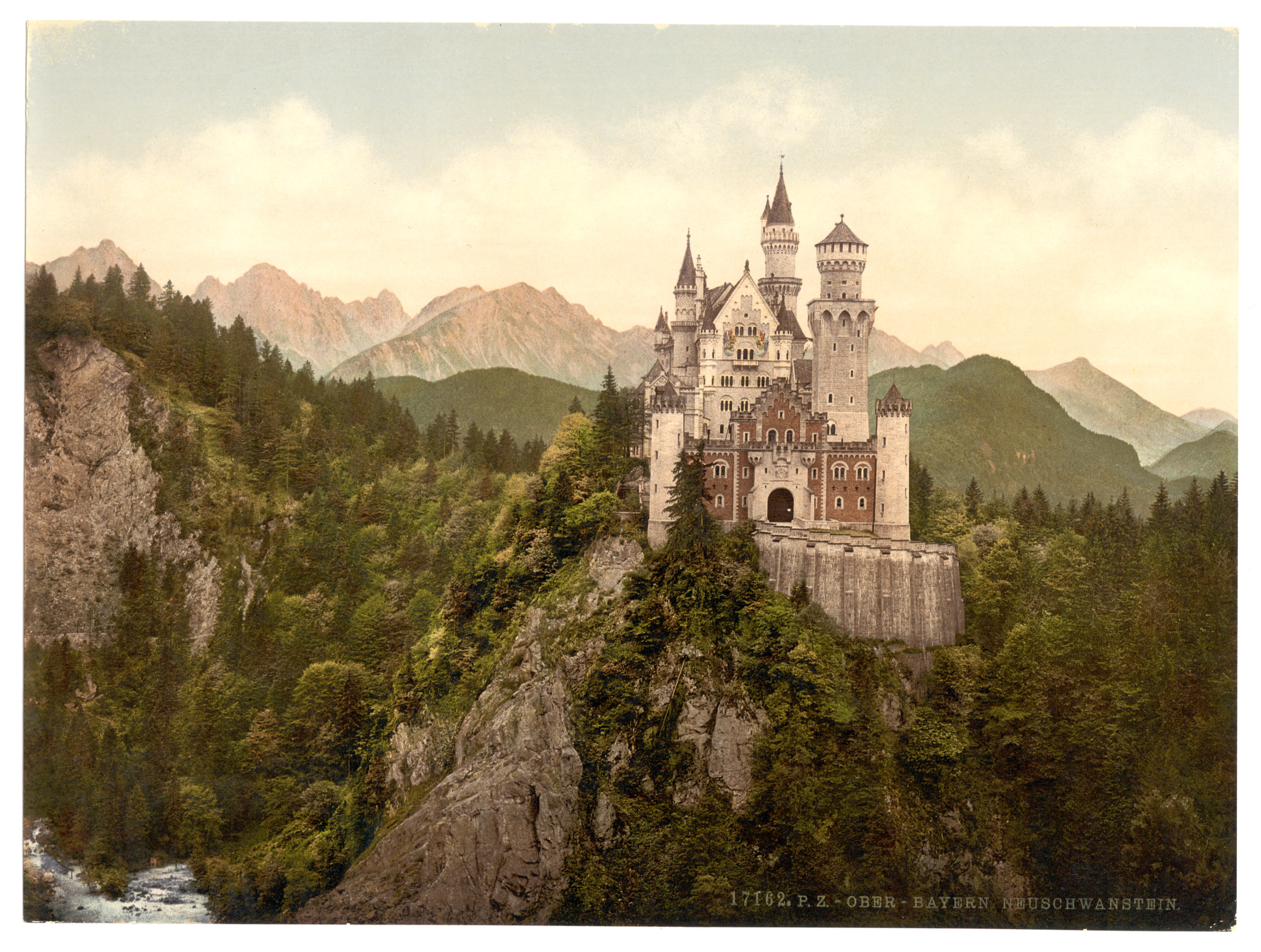
1890s photochrom print of Neuschwanstein Castle, Bavaria, Germany

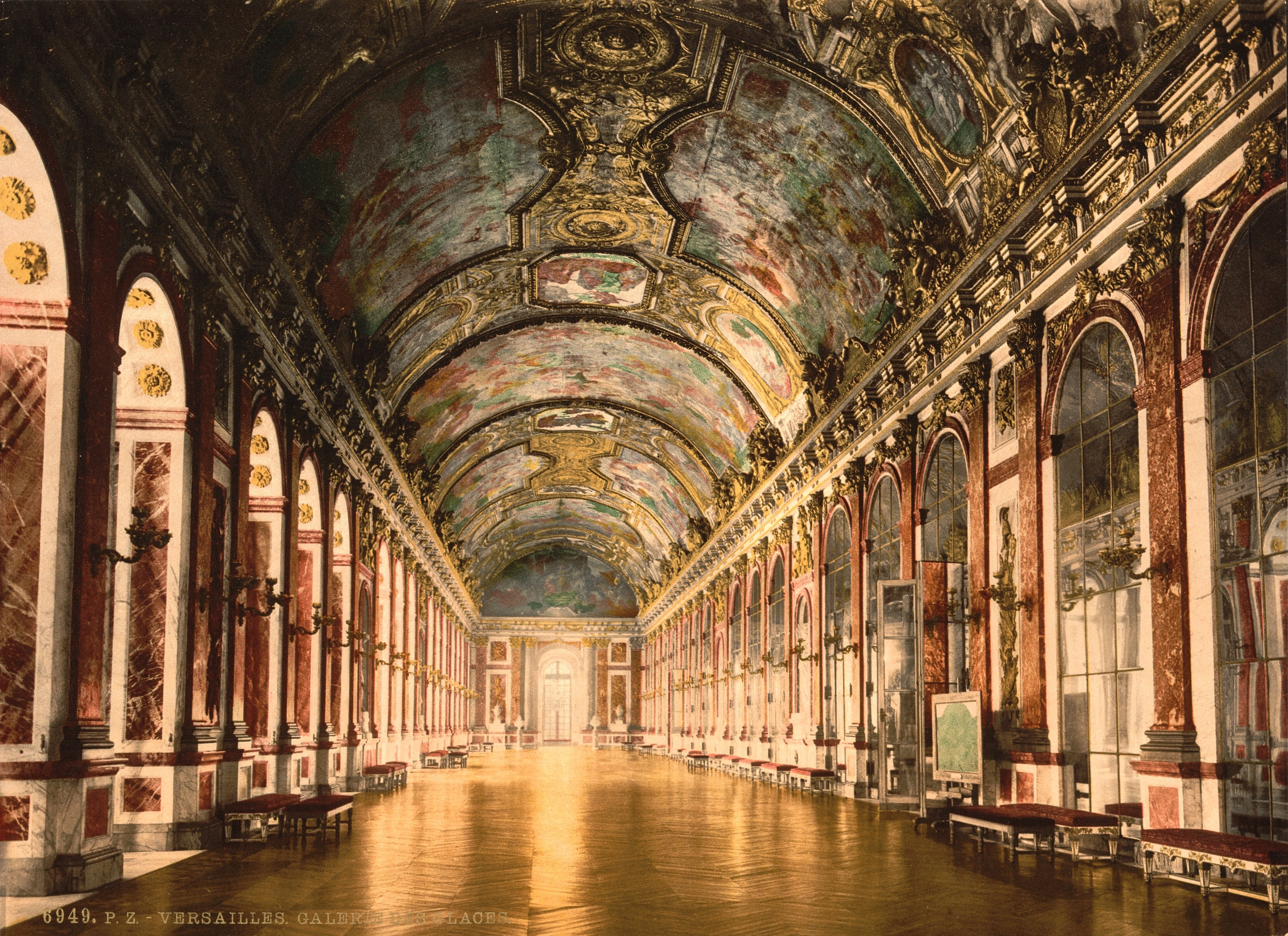
The Hall of Mirrors in Versailles, France, end of the 19th century

== See also ==
- Autochrome Lumière, a pioneer form of color photography (its process was different from this one)
- Sergey Prokudin-Gorsky, a pioneer of color photography (his process was different from this one)
