= Detroit Publishing Company =

US photographic publisher

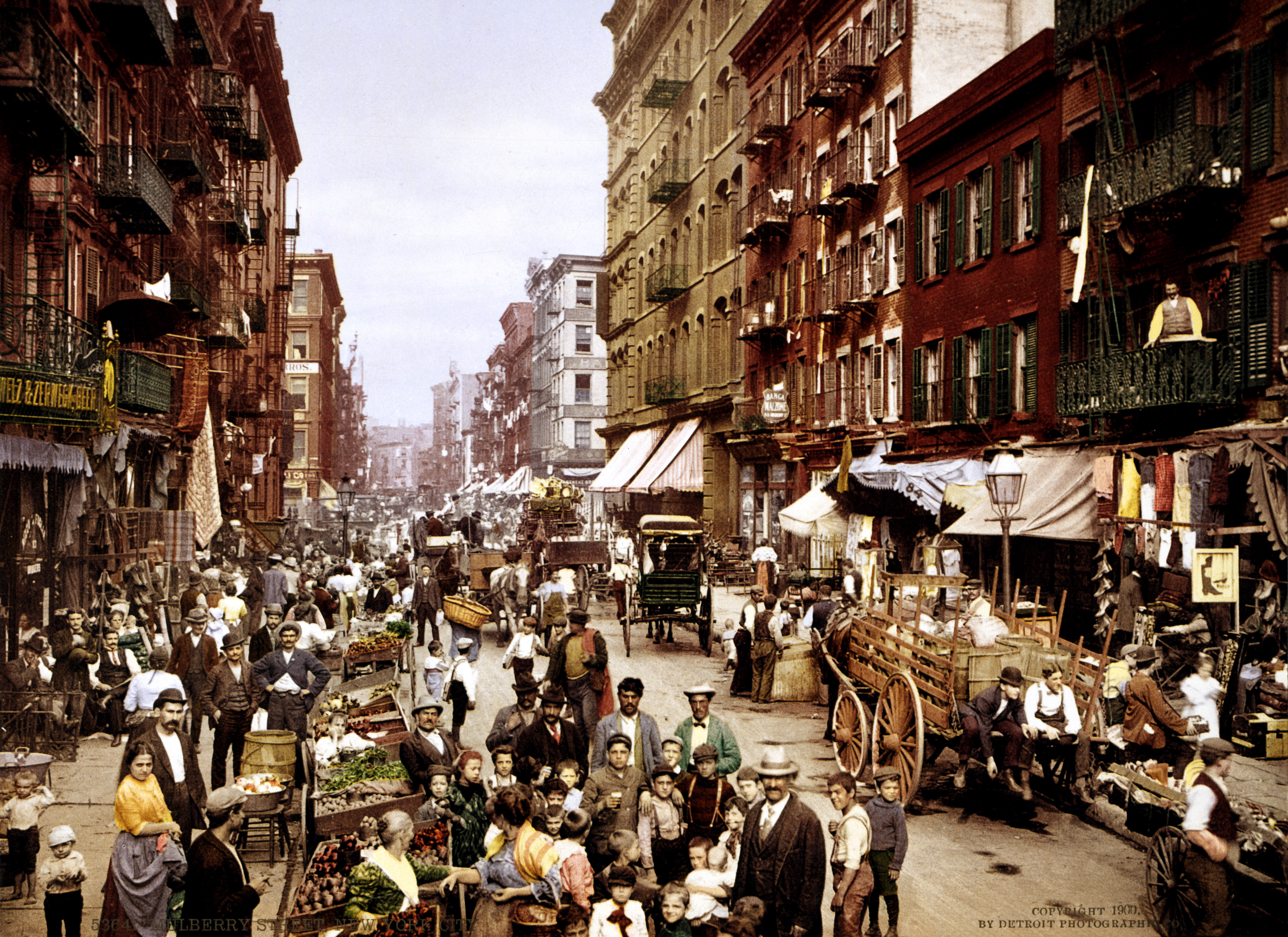
A photochrom postcard of Mulberry Street in New York City by the Detroit Photographic Co., c. 1900

The Detroit Publishing Company was an American photographic publishing firm best known for its large assortment of photochrom color postcards.

== History ==
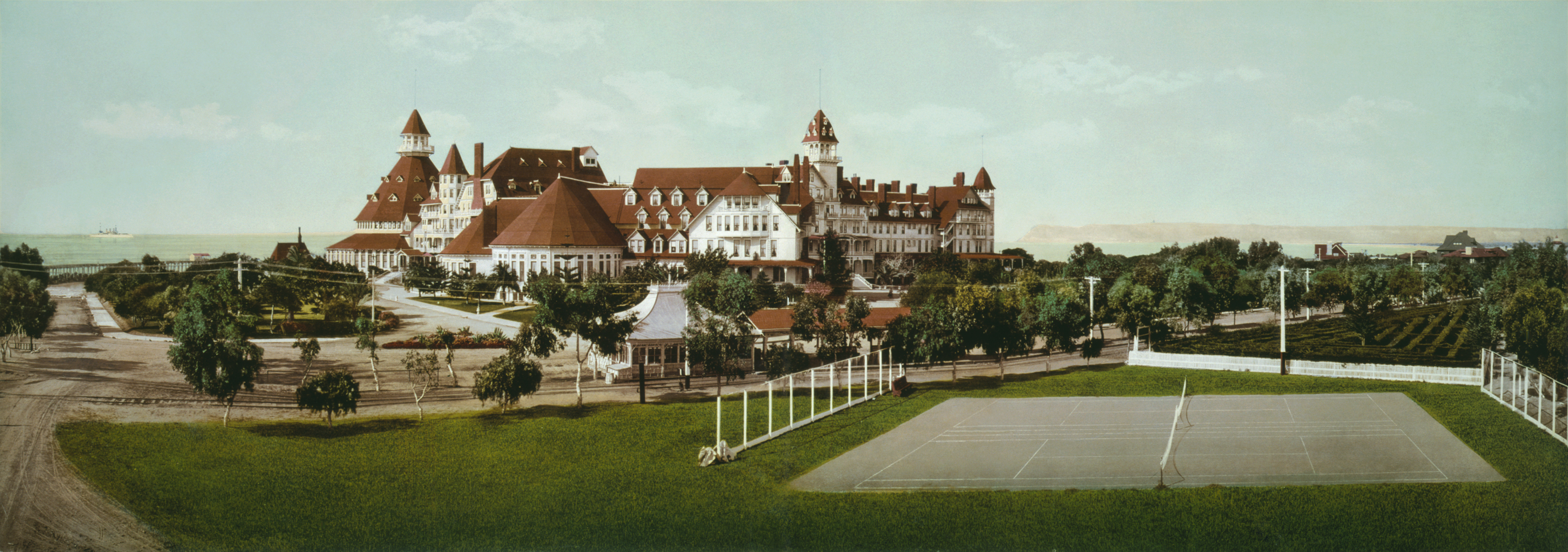
A restored photochrom print of Hotel del Coronado in Coronado, California, developed from a photograph by William Henry Jackson, c. 1900

The Detroit Publishing Company was started by publisher William A. Livingstone and photographer Edwin H. Husher in the late 19th century as the Detroit Photographic Company, it later became The Detroit Photochrom Company, and it was not until 1905 that the company called itself the Detroit Publishing Company.

The company acquired rights to a color printing process developed by Hans Jakob Schmid of Orell Fussli & Company of Switzerland called Photochrom. Photochrom allowed for the company to mass market postcards and other materials in color. The Detroit Publishing Company started to market this in 1907 under the name "photostint".

By the time of World War I, the company faced declining sales both due to the war economy and the competition from cheaper, more advanced printing methods. The company declared bankruptcy in 1924 and was liquidated in 1932.

=== William Henry Jackson ===
The best-known photographer for the company was William Henry Jackson, who joined the company in 1897. He became the plant manager in 1903.

== Other photographers ==
Other photographers published by the company include Lycurgus S. Glover (1858-1935), Henry Greenwood Peabody (1855-1951), John S. Johnston (c.1839-1899), Herbert R. Fitch (1868-1968), Clarence S. Jackson (1876-1961), Almon J. Tripp (c.1882-1962) and naval photographer Edward H. Hart.

== Naval photography ==
The company published images of U.S. naval scenes and Cuba during the Spanish American War.

== Legacy ==
The Library of Congress has a collection of the conpany's images.

== Publishings ==
- List of Views from the W. H. Jackson Negatives in Silver, Carbon and Special Hand Colored Prints by William Henry Jackson (1898) Call number: E169.J156 [P&P]; Microfilm 79585 E.
- Detroit Photographic Company, Catalogue F Detroit (1899) Call number: TR199.D47 [P&P]; Microfilm LOT 12027. (lists scenic, architectural, and marine views in the United States and abroad, and provides information about print sizes, types of photographic prints available, and corresponding prices)
- Detroit Photographic Company, Catalogue J. (1901-1905) Call number: TR199.D48 [P&P]; Microfilm LOT 12027. (Three-volume revised edition of Catalogue F.)
- Detroit Publishing Company, Catalogue P. (19--?) Call number: E169.D475 [P&P]; Microfilm 79584 E. (a revised edition of Catalogue J, part 2.)
- Little "Phostint" Journeys (1912-?) Call number: NC1875.D4 [P&P Case X]
- "Thistle Publications" Office Catalogue of Works of Art Reproduced from Eleven Leading Galleries of the United States and Many Private Collections (1912) Call number: NE1860.A2D4 [P&P]

== Library collections ==
Most of the existing negatives and prints are now housed by the United States Library of Congress, which received them via the Edison Institute and the Colorado Historical Society in 1949. Most images are visible in digital form at the Library of Congress Web site.

- Detroit Photographic Company’s Views of North America, ca. 1897-1924 from the Beinecke Rare Book & Manuscript Library
- Detroit Publishing Company Collection - Library of Congress
- The Detroit Publishing Company Collection at the New-York Historical Society
- The Detroit Publishing Company Collection at the Newberry Library
- William Henry Jackson Photochrom Collection, Decker Library, Maryland Institute College of Art
- William Henry Jackson Photochrom Print Collection, Newberry Library
- William Henry Jackson Photochrom Collection, Amherst College Archives and Special Collections
