= Frank Paul Sauerwein =

American painter

Frank Paul Sauerwein (1871-1910) was an American painter of the American West.
