= Deer Lady =

- Reservation Dogs episode
- At an American Indian boarding school, a group of children are served a meal as part of their cultural assimilation.
- Episode no.: Season 3 Episode 3
- Directed by: Danis Goulet
- Written by: Sterlin Harjo
- Cinematography by: Mark Schwartzbard
- Editing by: Varun Viswanath; Patrick Tuck
- Production code: XRDV3003
- Original air date: August 9, 2023
- Running time: 28–30 minutes (Note: The episode's listed running time ranges from 28–30 minutes, dependent upon the source.)

Guest appearances
- Kaniehtiio Horn as Deer Lady; John Getz as James Minor; Haley Sims as Sister Jenson; Georgeanne Growingthunder as young Deer Lady

Episode chronology
| ← Previous "Maximus" | Next → "Friday" |

"Deer Lady" is the third episode in the third season of the comedy and teen drama television series Reservation Dogs. The twenty-first episode overall, it was written by the program's showrunner and co-creator, Sterlin Harjo, and directed by Danis Goulet.

Reservation Dogs tells the story of Elora (Devery Jacobs), Bear (D'Pharaoh Woon-A-Tai), Cheese (Lane Factor), and Willie Jack (Paulina Alexis), a group of four friends and Indigenous teenagers who live in Oklahoma. They refer to themselves as the "Rez Dogs" and hope to eventually visit California in memory of their friend Daniel who committed suicide. Deer Lady is a recurring character in the show based on the mythological spirit, Deer Woman. In the episode, Bear, looking for his way back to Okern, Oklahoma, receives help from Deer Lady (Kaniehtiio Horn) and her backstory is explored.

Inspired by 1970s horror films and 1990s indie films, the story focuses on the history of American Indian boarding schools and makes use of the endangered Kiowa language. The production team consulted multiple subject matter experts to ensure that the topics were accurately represented. Post-production staff faced challenges in perfecting the audio as well as editing and scoring it.

The episode was first released on FX on Hulu on August 9, 2023. It received positive reviews from critics, particularly for its storytelling and use of gibberish—a nonsense form of speech spoken in the episode. It won an Art Directors Guild Award and was nominated for a Creative Arts Emmy Award and a Gold Derby Television Award.

== Plot ==
On a road trip, Deer Lady stops at a convenience store restroom to rinse blood off of a pair of antlers and then continues on her drive. In a flashback, she recalls her childhood when she was still human and part of a group of Native American children who were kidnapped and taken to an American Indian boarding school, St. Nicholas Indian Training School. Upon their arrival, the children have their hair cut and deloused by the nuns.

Back in the present day, Deer Lady stops at a nearby diner and orders two pies. In further flashbacks, she has more memories of the boarding school, as she was abused for speaking her native language and heard a child being beaten by James Minor, the man who ran the boarding school. Her friend Koda tells her that she should smile, because they cannot take that away.

Bear—an Indigenous teenager living on an Indian Reservation in Oklahoma—arrives at the diner, lost and without money, while looking for a way back to Okern. Deer Lady observes him for a while, then invites him to sit with her. She shares her food with him, before revealing her true form by showing her hooves. Bear is frightened and asks if she is there to kill him, but stays with her, eventually accepting a ride home.

Deer Lady then remembers being forced into American culture by learning how to farm and hymns such as "Jesus Loves Me"; she also recalls witnessing graves being dug at the boarding school. Koda warns her about Minor, telling her he is a "human wolf". On the way to Okern, Deer Lady stops at Minor's house and tells Bear to remain in the truck. Minor, now an elderly man, invites her in and reminisces about his time at the school, causing Deer Lady to remember Koda being dragged away to be taken to Minor, which led to her escaping through the forest where she encountered an otherworldly deer who offered her protection. She then kills Minor with her antlers. Afterwards, she drives Bear back to Okern, when he asks if she killed someone in the house. She says she killed a "human wolf", before repeating the same advice she received from Koda. Deer Lady has a final recollection of Koda asking her to go fishing with him, before she drives to his grave.

== Production ==
=== Development and writing ===
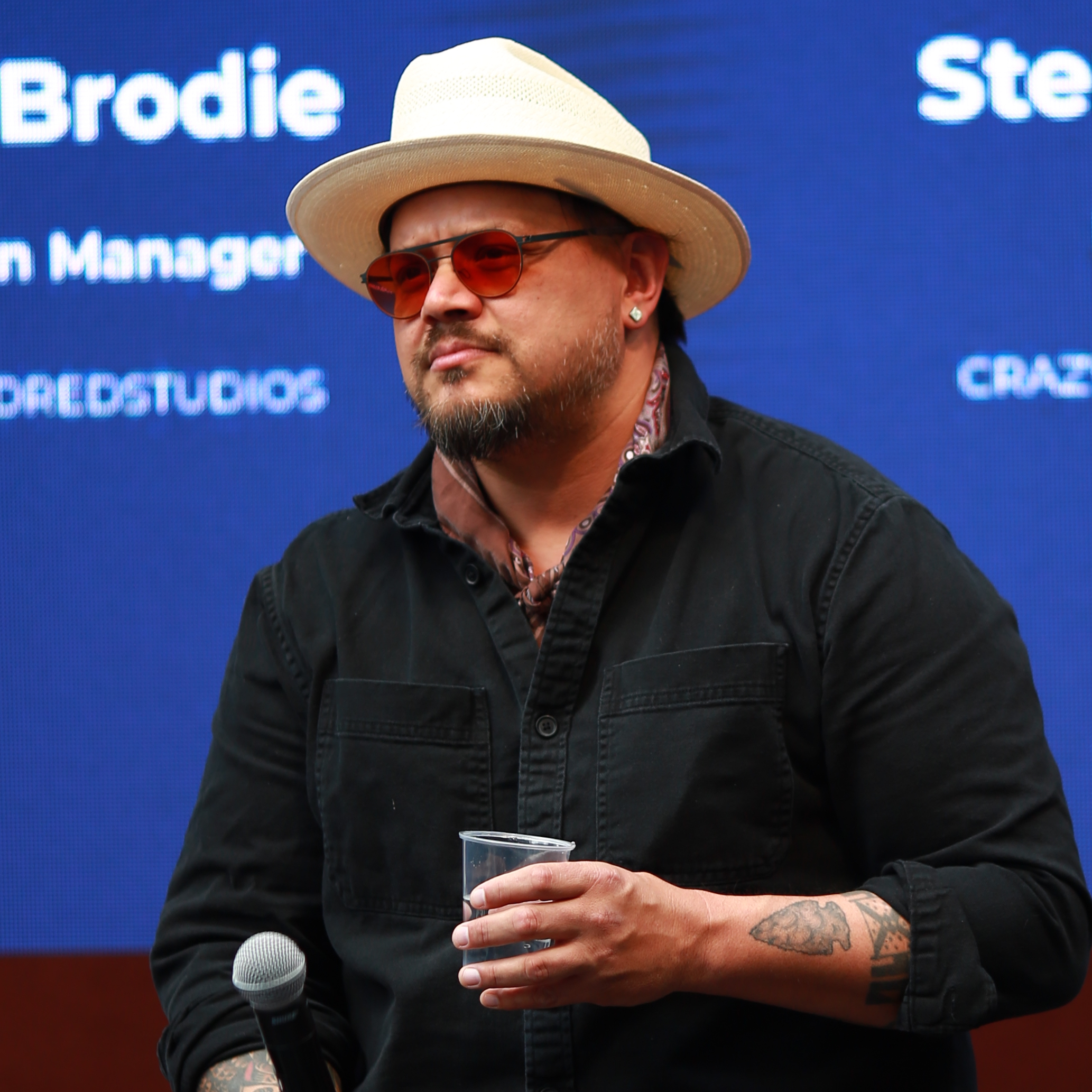
The episode was written by showrunner and co-creator Sterlin Harjo (pictured in 2024).

"Deer Lady" was written by showrunner and co-creator Sterlin Harjo (Seminole/Muscogee (Note: This article includes the tribal-related affiliations of Indigenous Peoples in parentheses following the first mention of that person.)) and directed by Danis Goulet (Cree/Métis). Harjo wrote the episode as a split script—a teleplay that alternates its scenes between two series of events—switching between experiences of the present day and flashbacks to the past. The episode explores the origin story of Deer Lady, its titular character and a recurring character within the series, as well as the events that led to her becoming a spirit. Her justifications for murder are also examined. Also known as Deer Woman, Deer Lady is a Native American myth known for her associations with love and fertility but also for her vengeance on men who have harmed women and children.

Within the series, both actors portraying the central characters are also Indigenous: Deer Lady, played by Kaniehtiio Horn (Kahnawake Mohawk), and Bear, portrayed by D'Pharaoh Woon-A-Tai (Oji-Cree), who is also the only main series cast member appearing in this episode.

Flashback scenes take the form of a period drama with an educational tone, unusual for the series, depicting the story of Native American assimilation at American Indian boarding schools. Harjo said he felt an obligation to "tell some truths" about this and wanted to "show people what the reality was"; to do this, he included themes of historical trauma. For instance—inspired by the way the voice of Charlie Brown's teacher from the Peanuts film franchise was made to sound like a trombone—Harjo decided that the English speech of the nuns at the school should sound like gibberish to viewers just as the Native schoolchildren would have experienced it.

=== Filming ===
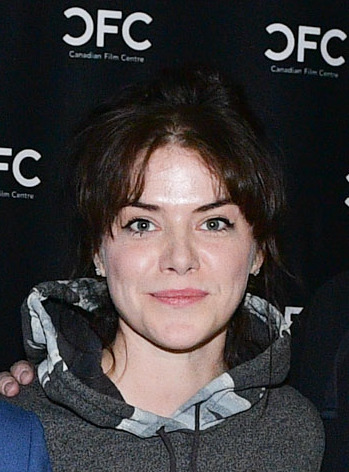
Kaniehtiio Horn (pictured in 2018) portrays the episode's titular character, Deer Lady.

The episode is one of two that Goulet directed for the season, along with the season premiere, "Bussin". She and Harjo drew inspiration from horror films of the 1970s for scenes set at the boarding school. Goulet stated that she wanted to specifically draw from this era because of the mixture of "intense realism" and "something fantastical", although she also named the 2018 reboot of Suspiria as an influence. The current-day scenes in the diner, however, use elements similar to indie films from the 1990s.

Denise Lajimodiere, the author of Stringing Rosaries, a book about American Indian boarding schools, was on set to ensure authentic representation in the flashback scenes. Spiritual leaders and parents were also on set during the filming of these scenes to help the child actors feel more comfortable.

Scenes at the school make use of Kiowa, an endangered language of which only 20 native speakers remain. Warren C. Queton (Kiowa/Cherokee/Seminole), a language consultant, was hired to assist young performers with their pronunciation, holding Zoom meetings with the children before filming began for lessons on speaking the language. One of the child actors, Georgeanne Growingthunder (Fort Peck/Sioux/Nakoda/Kiowa/Mvskoke/Seminole)—cast in the role of the young Deer Lady—was already in the process of learning the language. Another child actor, Michael Podemski-Bedard, who portrays Koda, was the son of actress Jennifer Podemski (of Muscowpetung descent), who appears in the show as Dana.

For Goulet, several school scenes in the episode were particularly challenging, in particular the one that included a Native American child getting a haircut. This was because Native American beliefs about hair caused the production team to spend weeks deciding whether to use a wig or to actually cut a child's hair, considering that in many Native cultures hair is cut only during mourning. After much input was received about this, the decision was finally made to film an actual haircut when a child actor was located who was already going to have one. In another scene near the end of the episode, Goulet initially intended to zoom in as the murder is committed but later decided to use a close-up technique because she felt it captured the emotion better. The director of photography, Mark Schwartzbard, then used a Steadicam to film Deer Lady as she exits the house and walks away for a "heavy but graceful" effect.

Horn has commented that in playing Deer Lady, she drew on memories from personal experience to guide her acting in the episode, specifically recalling how her older sister, Waneek Horn-Miller, was bayoneted and nearly died while holding her as a young child during the Canadian Oka Crisis in 1990.

=== Post-production and music ===
Patrick Hogan, the sound supervisor, and Mato Wayuhi (Oglala Lakota), the music composer, were tasked with achieving the intended sound effect for the nuns' gibberish. Hogan said that takes filmed by Goulet of the nuns speaking gibberish were unusable because it sounded like a "German–Dutch" hybrid. The post-production team then asked the actresses who portrayed the nuns to return to the studio so they could attempt automated dialogue replacement (ADR)—mixing up the words within their sentences instead—but according to Hogan, this attempt made them sound too much like Yoda—a fictional character in the Star Wars franchise who uses a backward speech pattern.

Hogan then teamed up with the dialogue editor, David Beadle, who determined that they needed to manipulate the audio quality. They used a lower pitch for the nuns' voices, which made "nonsense ad-libs and mismatched English sound as booming as a dragon's bellow", and then reversed the voices to complete the effect.

A similar technique was used in one of the final scenes, in which the young Deer Lady comes across a deer spirit in the forest who speaks to her. The deer's dialogue was recorded in the Kiowa language, voiced by one of the remaining native speakers. Wayuhi provided a musical score for this scene, and the dialogue was fit to this score to make it sound more lyrical, and he described the final musical cue as a "challenge to find a median between hopefulness and hopelessness".

According to Goulet, the episode's editor, Varun Viswanath, stated that he was "very emotional" during the process and that the editing was going more slowly than normal. Viswanath also called it "the most challenging thing to work on" and said that there were probably "40 different compelling cuts of this episode in our Avid projects", referring to a software application. After he and Goulet were satisfied with the director's cut, the episode was passed on to Harjo and another editor, Patrick Tuck, who made the final cut.

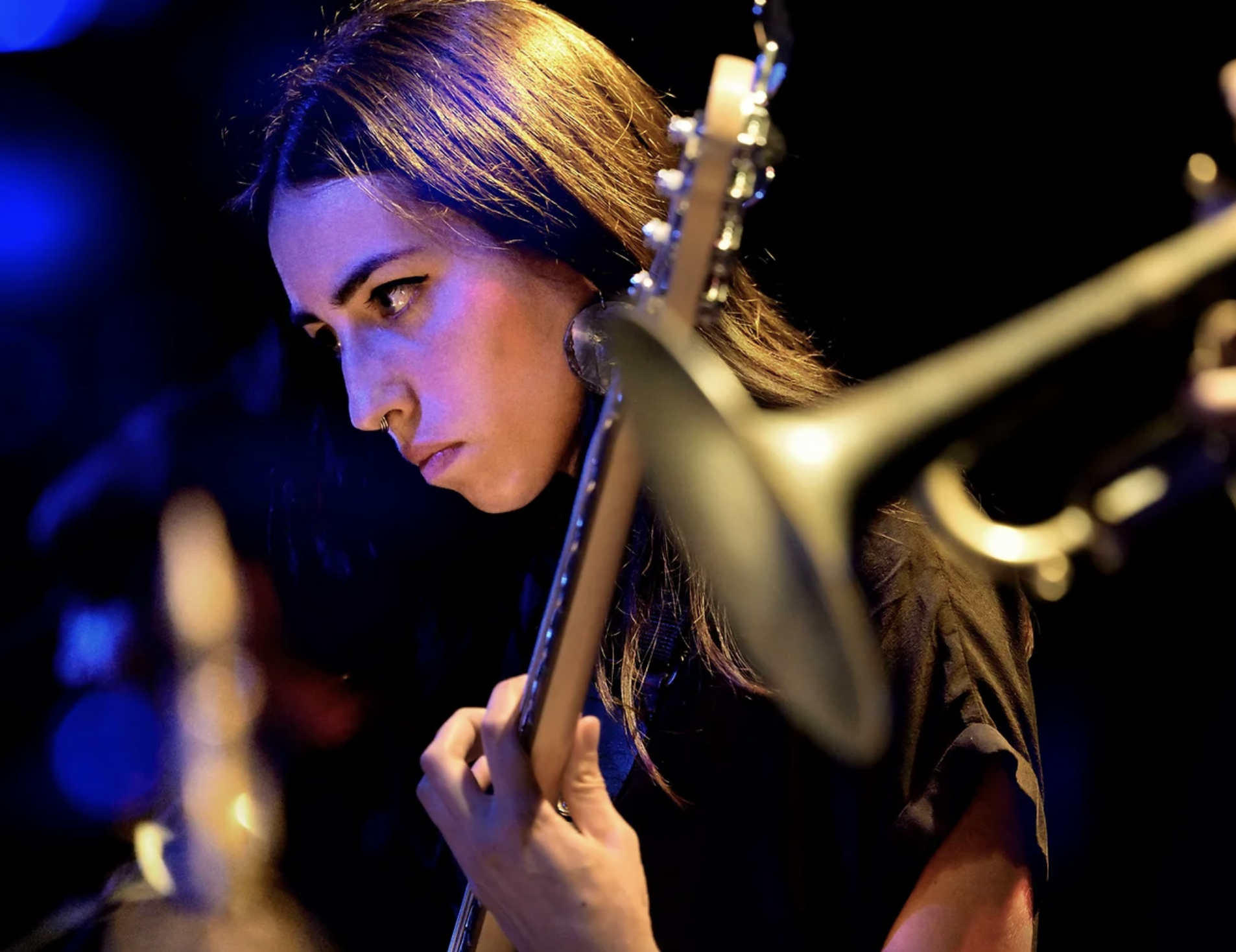
The episode included two songs from Indigenous musician Mali Obomsawin (pictured in 2022).

Featured music in the episode included two songs from Mali Obomsawin (Odanak/Abenaki), "Fractions" and "Lineage"; two songs from Durwood Daily Haddock, "How Lonesome Can I Get" and "Start All Over"; and one song from Don Mcginnis, "Memory Bound".

== Release and reception ==
"Deer Lady" was released on Hulu on August 9, 2023, under its FX on Hulu content banner. Due to the episode's depictions of kidnapping and abuse, a viewer discretion notice was added to the opening of the episode at the suggestion of Horn, who brought up the idea to Harjo.

Alan Sepinwall from Rolling Stone appreciated the episode's use of gibberish, he explained that it would cause Deer Lady to essentially view the nuns as extraterrestrial life and therefore called it a "smart stylistic choice". Vulture critic Kali Simmons similarly applauded this aspect for the way it emotionally connected viewers to the way that Deer Lady felt. Reviewing "Deer Lady" for IndieWire, Proma Khosla called it "one of the show's best and most powerful yet" and praised the exploration into Deer Lady's character from both the traumatic and spiritual aspects. The A.V. Club's Manuel Bentacourt wrote that the episode was a "transcendent half hour of television"; he commended the series for expanding Deer Lady's origin story to include the topic of American Indian boarding schools, something that is not part of the spirit's historical folklore. Hannah Giorgis of The Atlantic highlighted how Goulet used "Deer Lady" to connect to the real world controversy surrounding American Indian boarding schools, such as the mass gravesites found at some of them.

Paste author Josh Harris ranked the episode as the second-best of the series for its impression on the topics addressed. Brandy McDonnell, writing for The Oklahoman ranked Bear meeting Deer Lady as the third-best moment of Reservation Dogs and considered the story as one of the greatest recent television episodes. During the 2023 Art Directors Guild Awards, production designer Brandon Tonner-Connolly won an Excellence in Production Design award for Half-Hour Single-Camera Television Series for his contributions to the episode. TVGuide named "Deer Lady" as the best television episode of 2023. Horn received an honorable mention as TVLine's Performer of the Week in August 2023, with the editor describing her performance as having "exhibited beautiful depth and a full spectrum of emotions" and referring to the episode as "one of the series' most powerful yet". In the 2024 Gold Derby Television Awards, Harjo and Goulet picked up nominations for the episode's writing and direction. At the 76th Primetime Creative Arts Emmy Awards—a section of the Primetime Emmys that awards achievements in crafts—in 2024, Schwartzbard also received a nomination in the Outstanding Cinematography for a Single-Camera Half-Hour Series category.
