= Ellen Gabriel =

Mohawk activist and artist

Ellen Gabriel Katsi'tsakwas
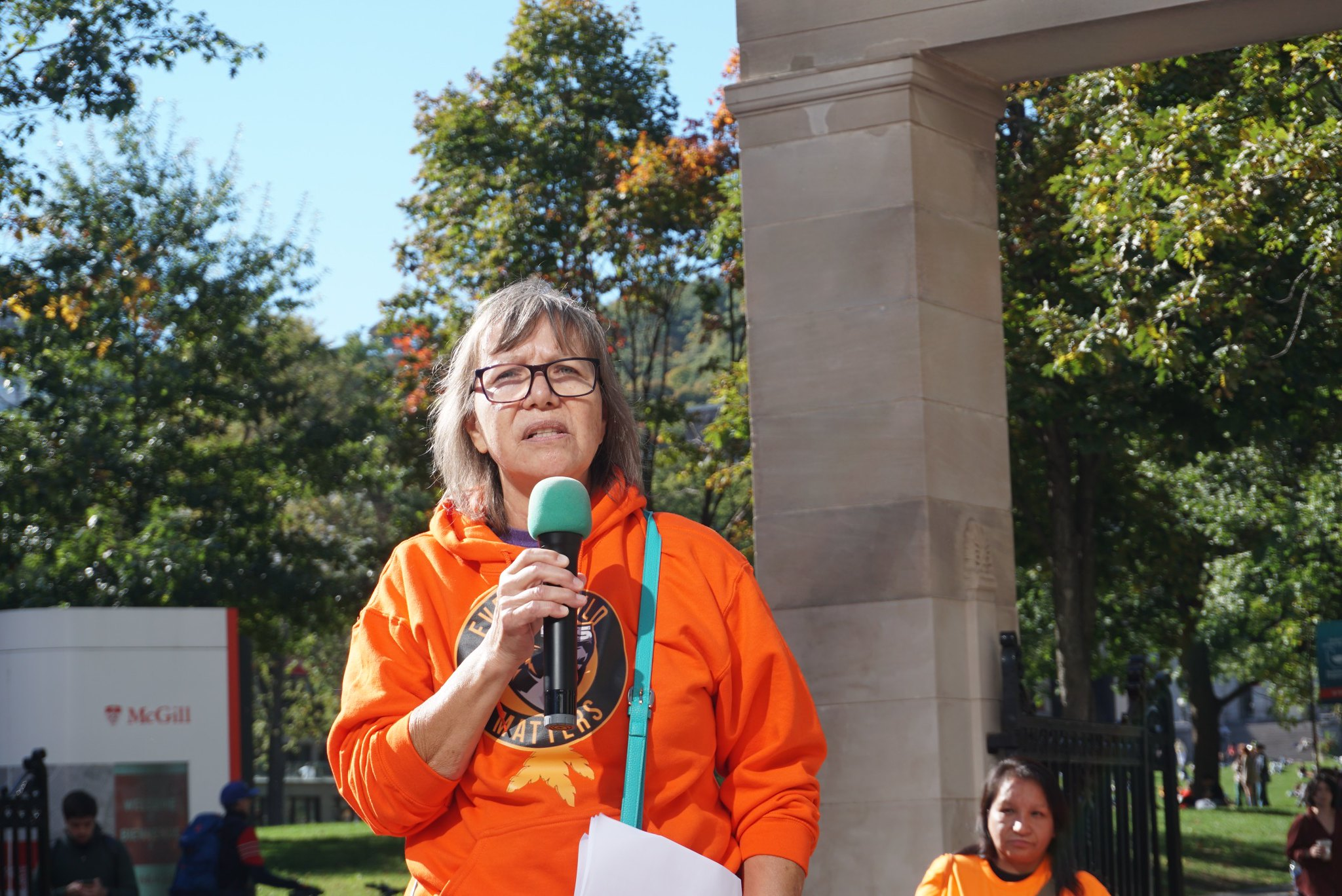
- Born: 1959 (age 66–67); Kanehsatà:ke Nation, Quebec, Canada
- Citizenship: Canada
- Occupation: Writer
- Known for: Role in the Oka Crisis

Ellen Gabriel (born 1959), also known as Katsi'tsakwas, is a Mohawk activist and artist from Kanehsatà:ke Nation (Kanehsatà:ke Quebec, Canada) – Turtle Clan, known for her involvement as the official spokesperson, chosen by the People of the Longhouse, during the Oka Crisis.

== Early life and education ==
Ellen Gabriel was born in 1959 in Kanehsatà:ke Nation, Quebec, Canada. From a young age, she was passionate about art. Gabriel grew up during the 1960s and 1970s, witnessing anti-war and women's rights movements, which sparked her interest in activism.

In May 1990, she received a Bachelor of Fine Arts from Concordia University, majoring in Studio Art. In 2021, Gabriel completed a one-year conservatory program in Documentary at the New York Film Academy.

== Career ==
Ellen Gabriel began her career as an art teacher at the Kanehsatake Language and Cultural Center. In 1993, the documentary Kanehsatake: 270 Years of Resistance was released; she was a prominent part of the film. Gabriel also worked as a coordinator of the First People’s House at McGill University from 2001 to 2004.

Following this, Gabriel became the president at Quebec Native Women Inc. (QNW) in Kahnawake, Quebec, from March 2004 to December 2010. During this time she was an advocate for Indigenous women's rights, especially in response to policies under the Canadian Indian Act in the form of Bill C-31. Her work consisted of presenting issues and concerns regarding the challenges faced by Indigenous women to Parliamentary committees, standing committees, and National Assembly committees.

Gabriel further participated on the board of the National Aboriginal Health Organization, where workshops were organized regarding how colonization has affected Indigenous peoples, focusing on women. During her role as the president of Quebec Native Women Inc., Gabriel connected with other Indigenous and non-Indigenous organizations, such as the Native Women Shelters network, and wrote articles regarding important issues that affect Indigenous peoples. She continued her career as a technical consultant at the Kanehsatà:ke Language and Cultural Center, where she has worked since November 2011. This position involves strengthening and restoring the Kanien’keha language in her community.

After completing a diploma at the New York Film Academy in 2021, Gabriel has been a freelance documentarian. Her work includes the documentary When the Pine Needles Fall, which documents the events that started the 78-day standoff between the police and the community during the Oka Crisis in 1990.

== Activism ==
In March 1990, Gabriel joined in the movement against the expansion of a golf course in Oka, Quebec. That event eventually escalated into the Oka Crisis.

Gabriel currently holds a position as member of Indigenous Climate Action's Steering Committee.

== Honours and awards ==
Honours and awards in film

- Selected at the American Indian Film Festival 2022
- Honorable Mention at the Tokyo Film Awards 2022
- Best Short Documentary at the LA Independent Women Film Awards 2022
- Best Student Film Kanatenhs for the film When the Pine Needles Fall, from the Melbourne Independent Film Festival 2022
- Best Student Short Kanatenhs for the film When the Pine Needles Fall, from the Sydney Indie Short Film Festival 2023

Honours and awards in Indigenous activism

- Golden Eagle Award from the Native Women's Association of Canada, 2005
- International Women's Day Award from the Barreau du Québec/Québec Bar Association
- Jigonsaseh Women of Peace Award, 2008

== See also ==
- Mohawk Warrior Society
- Kahn-Tineta Horn
- Waneek Horn-Miller
- United Nations Permanent Forum on Indigenous Issues
