= Peace Village =

Peace Village may refer to:

- Peace Village (North Korea), or Kijong-dong, a village in Panmun-gun, North Korea
- Peace Village (Winnipeg, Manitoba), a 1990 encampment by indigenous activists at the Provincial Legislative Building in Winnipeg, Manitoba, Canada
- Peace Village, a subdivision in Maple, Toronto, Canada
