= Faces in the Moon =

Autobiographical novel by Betty Louise Bell

- 1994 cover of Faces in the Moon
- Author: Betty Louise Bell
- Cover artist: Bill Cason
- Language: English
- Genre: Native American Literature; autobiographical fiction
- Published: 1994 (University of Oklahoma Press)
- Publication place: United States
- Media type: Print (paperback)
- Pages: 193
- ISBN: 0-8061-2774-0
- OCLC: 29359813

Faces in the Moon is an autobiographical novel written by Betty Louise Bell. It was published in 1994. Bell describes this work as "essentially autobiographical fiction, except I [Bell] have nine siblings and my mother was still alive when the book was written. Otherwise, it's pretty much from my life." The work describes Lucie Evers' homecoming and examines how she reestablishes connections with her past, her heritage, and her family.

== Plot summary ==
The novel begins in present time. Lucie returns to her mother's house when Gracie has fallen ill. While her mother is in the hospital, Lucie stays at Gracies house, and her memories take her back to different parts of her childhood. We are offered a glimpse into a very bleak reality. Lucie is required, at the age of four, to make breakfast for Gracie and her current boyfriend, J.D. One morning while Gracie is sleeping off the drinking from the previous night, J.D. begins to verbally abuse Lucie. He mimics her; he tells her shes trash and so is her mother. All of this is being said while the four-year-old makes him breakfast. After J.D. sexually molests her, Gracie decides to take Lucie to the farm to stay with Lizzie. Unaware of the abuse, she only sees that J.D. is upset with Lucies lack of respect for two years, and most of the novel takes place during this time. It is here that Lucie hears more stories of her heritage. Arriving a child wise beyond her years to the pain of the world, Lucie's time at the farm allows her to learn how to be a child, to play, to pretend.

It is Lizzie, a "full-blooded" woman, who mediates the young girl's relationship to the traditional past. Lizzie not only represents an alternative to Gracie's dissolute lifestyle, but she also helps preserve the history and meaning of the lives of the women in the family by telling and retelling stories imbued with what she thinks it means to be an Indian woman. Years later, when Gracie is hospitalized, Lucie returns to Oklahoma, and with her return come the memories of childhood.

== Character synopsis ==
- Helen Evers- Helen is a full blood Cherokee Indian woman. She was her father's only girl and his favorite. Helen spent much of her childhood with Lizzie, Emmie, and their mother. She is Gracie and Rozella's mother and Lucie's grandmother. She got pregnant by a Scotch preacher who left her after Rozella was born. Helen and her daughters lived in an abandoned car. She worked during The Great Depression in order to make a living for her family. Helen and Lucie are linked through their love of the story of Quanah Parker. The title of the book refers to Helen's face; Lucie, as a child and as an adult, comments that she sees Helen's face in the moon.
- Gracie Evers- Gracie is Lucie's mother, Rozella's sister, Helen's daughter, and Lizzie's niece. Gracie represents internalized white, mainstream culture. She has been through numerous husbands and has altered her appearance to look as far from native as possible. She sends Lucie to live with Lizzie at the request of J.D. It is Gracie's death that summons Lucie back to Oklahoma. As an older woman, Gracie stores numerous cans of food in an attempt to ensure she is never hungry like she was as a child.
- Lucie Evers- Lucie Gracie's daughter and is the protagonist of the story. She is a mixed-blood (Cherokee and Scotch) that is trying to cope with an identity crisis. Lucie is taken to her Aunt Lizzie's house around the age of four and lives with her for the majority of her childhood. She escapes to California and lives there as an adult. However, she returns to Oklahoma when she learns her mother is ill. Lucie is often described as looking like her grandmother Helen. Her memories and experiences are the substance of the book. In an autobiographical fiction context, Betty Louise Bell and Lucie are synonymous.
- Rozella- Rozella is Gracie's younger sister, Helen's daughter, and Lucie's "Auney." She has been through four marriages yet never divorced. When she grows bored with her husband, she always goes to Gracie for comfort. Lucie describes her as "silent and placid, she told no tales and didn't hit" (11). She is a heavy smoker who always seemed to marry heavy drinkers. When she dies, she leaves Lucie a lighter and a letter (written by Gracie) telling her how proud she was of her.
- Lizzie Evers- Lizzie is a full-blood Cherokee Indian woman. She is a sister-in-law to Helen Evers. Lizzie is Gracie's aunt and Lucie's great-aunt. She takes care of Lucie after the incident with J.D and introduces her to the native heritage that her mother (Gracie) has suppressed. Lizzie suffers, and eventually dies, from tuberculosis. She represents the traditional culture of Native Americans and serves as a foil character to Gracie.
- Uncle Jerry- Uncle Jerry is Lizzie's husband that suffers from war-induced post traumatic stress syndrome. He constantly talks to his radio. At the end of the novel, he uses the money Lizzie saved for her burial to buy a television set.
- Jeeter- "Old man Jeeter" is the man Helen married to ensure a home and food for her children. He is not represented in a very positive way. Gracie says she and her sister talked to their mother "about old man Jeeter and the hard life they had without her" (18). Nevertheless, the Gracie and Rozella stayed with him after Helen's death.
- Mabel- Mabel is Gracie's landlady and the woman who tells Lucie of her mother's illness. She is often represented as the prying neighbor.
- J.D.- J.D. is a supply sergeant stationed at Fort Hill. He is a heavy drinker and steals cigarettes, alcohol, and food from the government. J.D. dislikes Lucie and teases her constantly. He is also very abusive, hitting both Lucie and her mother. In a horrible incident when Lucie is only four years old, J.D. rapes her in the kitchen while Gracie sleeps. He threatens to leave Gracie if she does not get Lucie out of the house.
- Donny Khatib- Donny is a Lebanese hairdresser and Gracie's third husband. He came to the United States in his late forties. He and Gracie originally set up barber's chairs in the corner of a laundromat to make a living. Donny physically abuses Gracie throughout their marriage. He served seven years in prison after assaulting a teenage boy for making a racist comment against him.
- Johnnie Bevis- Johnnie is Gracie's current boyfriend. Johnnie is known for dating Indian women. He has children with an Indian woman named Delores but is now interested in Gracie.
- Uncle Henry- Uncle Henry is Bertha's husband. He spent time in an Indian Boarding School run by Southern Baptists. He and Bertha have ten children who all went to college. Uncle Henry has one leg due to an injury sustained in World War I. Gracie calls him an "uppity Indian" (43).
- Aunt Bertha- Aunt Bertha is Henry's Choctaw wife. She is short and plump with a round face. In an important part of the novel, Aunt Bertha makes the comment, alluding to Lucie, that mixed bloods are beautiful people.
- Melvin- Melvin is Lucie's ex-husband. He and his family did not respond kindly to Gracie when she came to Melvin and Lucie's wedding.
- Emmie- Emmie is Lizzie's sister. Lizzie makes brief reference to her when she describes Helen to Lucie.

== Major themes ==
- Oral storytelling

Oral storytelling is prevalent throughout Faces in the Moon. Oral storytelling is very important in Cherokee culture because it is a communal activity. Gracie and Rozella sit around the kitchen table and tell stories. Lizzie tells stories to Lucie. Although Gracie constantly reminds readers that Lucie does not have a story, Lucie is in fact telling her own story through the novel. Lucie often complains that she is tired of living in the past through stories. However, she acknowledges their importance in her life and says, "no matter how great my desire to run away from home, to live in a place and history free from secrets, I always take up my position at the table" (5). The novel itself also sounds like the spoken word. Readers get the sense that they are listening in on a conversation, maybe even participating at times, rather than having limited participation as outsiders. The book is dense with women's voices. Perhaps this is Bell's way of giving agency back to women after their voices had been left out due to colonization.

- Identity crisis

The best example of identity crisis can be seen through Lucie, the character representing the youngest generation. A cause of her identity crisis is through naming. As a child, she lived with an aunt who "never bothered with divorce, she simply lived in one married name until the opportunity for another came along" (11). Not only was it her aunt that did this, but her mother switched names as well. Her mother and aunt constantly moving from man to man and name to name is consistent with how the Cherokee's culture was changing as a result of their removal. This leads Lucie to confusion, and she asks to be baptized as Antoinette. Since she is so young, one may think making up a name is childish play, but baptism is not usually an act taken lightly. It is also important to notice that neither Lucie nor the reader knows her last name, adding to her confused identity.

- Confusion regarding Cherokee heritage

Bell makes her characters question their Cherokee heritage. Lucie can be seen as a victim of this confusion because she cannot relate to her non-native or her native side. Gracie and Auney send mixed signals by choosing "high heels over moccasins, blue eyes over black eyes" (58). They alter their looks to seem less Cherokee but claim to be Cherokee. The women are also mixed bloods (Scotch and Cherokee). Because of the mixed signals from her relatives, Lucie struggles with the notion of whether she is Cherokee or not because she knows she too is of mixed blood and she has conflicting identities. To complicate things even further, she hears Reverend Tom Cottonmouth say, "if youse got Cherokee blood a-running through your veins, no matter how distant, no matter how pre-e-e posterous, no matter how recent, the Cherokee loves y'all"(57). He makes a mockery of the Cherokee saying "For a ten dollar bill, no checks please, we'll send ya a authentic certificate of Cherokee blood. And wait Indian brothers and sisters, ifn ya do that 'fore midnight tonight, we'll send ya a genuine rock from the Cherokee nation"(57). Reverend Cottonmouth's claim is so ridiculous that it makes being Cherokee seem accessible for everyone. It's like the ultimate slap on the face for true Cherokee who suffered through the Indian Removal. This leaves Lucie confused because there is nothing she can relate to.

- Traditional vs. new

Throughout the novel, Bell juxtaposes what it means to live closer to the traditional way of native life as compared to the new way. She uses Lizzie and Gracie as representations of the traditional and new way of life, respectively. She farms the same land that she has always lived on and refuses to accept the stolen goods from Gracie's current love interest. Lizzie shows power and strength as she deals with the terrible disease of tuberculosis. She also tells many stories to Lucie and encourages her to dream. Also, Lizzie and Uncle Jerry share the workload on the farm; this shows the importance of a balance of power between men and women and is another stark contrast to the patriarchal society of mainstream culture. Whereas Lizzie has retained her native qualities, Gracie has internalized mainstream white culture. Her hair is dyed an unnatural platinum blonde. She tried to dye Rozella's hair, and nearly burned it all off. She even shaved Lucie's eyebrows and lined her eyes with dark makeup. Instead of working for her food like Lizzie does, Gracie stores the stolen goods from J.D. and sometimes profits from them. Bell is not only critiquing the internalization of mainstream, white culture, but she is saying that this goes hand-in-hand with the unnatural. Lizzie is connected to nature whereas Gracie seems in a way, concerned only with the synthetic.

- Generational gap

Gracie and Auney's attempt to maintain Cherokee culture through storytelling roles has in a sense failed, or caused a gap, in generations because at this point, the Cherokee are so far removed from their original customs that the next generation (or Lucie) cannot identify with the stories. Lucie says on page 58 that she "knew no Indian princesses, no buckskin, no feathers, no tomahawks." She goes on to say that she tried to see the women in her life as Indians but that she can't. Her lack of understanding the stories further complicates her identity as she has no first hand experience with tradition but at the same time is too far gone to get it back. Bell introduces a sense of worry in the text by making the reader question "well what is going to happen to the next generation?"

- Stability

Bell relates stability to both physical and psychological firmness and strength. She constructs characters that differ in their reactions to their Cherokee heritage in order to show that the strongest, most stable characters are those who do not run away from who they are. As a child and as an adult, Lucie struggles with the concept of her mixed blood heritage. She is connected to images of movement as she tries to figure out who she is. There is the image of physical movement as Lucie rides in her mother's car on the way to Lizzie's house. Lucie's physical movement is linked to psychological insecurity because she is unsure of what to expect. While at Lizzie's, Lucie comes down with an illness and has nights of restless sleep. In her dreams, she is running from wild dogs. She sees a native woman in the dream but cannot reach her. In the previous pages, Lucie and Lizzie were discussing why Lucie could not smile and wave to white men in the general store. When Lucie asked why she had to walk with her head down, Lizzie replied, "You're just different" (107). Lucie's dream and the physical movement of running and reaching within it can be connected to a lack of psychological strength concerning who she is. Lucie tries to run and reach out to her native side, but her actions fall short because she does not understand what it means to be mixed blood, Cherokee, and/or "different." The movement continues into Lucie's adulthood; she moves to California to escape the psychological hardships of her life in Oklahoma. At the end of the novel, Lucie is at her mother's funeral and sees three does. Her moment of physical and psychological stability emerges when "a stillness surrounded her, no leaf fluttered, and no bird sang, the earth paused waiting as I waited, giving up this moment to her peace" (186).

- Critique of historical documents

The United States Government told Cherokee Indians that they would get a certain amount of land in Indian Territory. However, many Cherokee did not understand the complicated diction that the officials used. Bell spends five and a half pages critiquing the historical documents related to these incidents. Colonel Needles asks Robert Evers, Helen's father, a list of questions regarding his family. Evers answers them to the best of his ability even when some are obviously meant to belittle the Cherokee. For example, the Colonel treats him like a suspect when he asks if he has ever discussed seceding from the Union. The Colonel's last question is intricately worded and ends with the agreement that Evers' land can be revoked at any time. Evers, not understand, replies with "Sir?". This scene represents how the government manipulated the Cherokee through complicated language and ultimately made it possible to legally strip them of their promised land. Bell also critiques Helen Evers' death certificate. Both her date and place of birth is unknown. Her father's name is listed as "none." Bell expresses, through Lucie's viewpoint, the sickening feeling she gets when she reads this. Critiquing these documents also allows Bell to comment on how the Cherokee people are/were viewed as disposable and in some cases, nonexistent.

== Historical, cultural, and artistic allusions ==
- Quanah Parker

Lizzie tells Lucie a story about the mixed blood warrior, Quanah Parker. Later, Lucie dreams about him and wonders if she should tell her great-aunt. When Gracie comes to visit, Lucie mentions that she has seen Quanah Parker. Lizzie warns the child of calling up spirits whereas Gracie laughs and calls it another one of Lizzie's stories. In history, Quanah Parker was an "able metis chief of the Comanche people at the end of the nineteenth century during a difficult transition period that took the Plains Indians from their classical age into a new era. A leader of the Quahada band that ranged over Llano Estacado and through its deep canyons on the southern Great Plains, he was one of the last warriors to lead his people permanently to the reservation in Indian Territory."

- Cherokee Rolls, Dawes Commission

At the end of the book, Lucie returns to Oklahoma City and goes to the Oklahoma Historical Society room. She asks to see the Cherokee Rolls so she can look up her grandmother's father. The Dawes Rolls, also known as the "Final Rolls", are the lists of individuals who were accepted as eligible for tribal membership in the "Five Civilized Tribes": Cherokees, Creeks, Choctaws, Chickasaws, and Seminoles. (It does not include those whose applications were stricken, rejected or judged as doubtful.) Those found eligible for the Final Rolls were entitled to an allotment of land, usually as a homestead.

- Deer Woman

When Lucie is at her mother's funeral, she sees three does. This alludes to the Cherokee story of the Deer Woman. "The Deer Woman spirit teaches us that marriage and family life within the community are important and these relationships cannot be entered into lightly. Her tales are morality narratives: she teaches us that the misuse of sexual power is a transgression that will end in madness and death. The only way to save oneself from the magic of Deer Woman is to look to her feet, see her hooves, and recognize her for what she is. To know the story and act appropriately is to save oneself from a lifetime lived in pain and sorrow; to ignore the story is to continue in the death dance with Deer Woman."

- World War I

Lucie mentions that Uncle Jerry and Uncle Henry fought in World War I. This piece of information is important because it helps to explain why Uncle Jerry talks to himself and to the radio. Gracie tells Lucie that the stress from the war caused Uncle Jerry to "lose his peace of mind" (90).

- Layers of Stories

The cover of Bell's Faces in the Moon is an image of Connie Seaborn's 30" X 22" watercolor, Layers of Stories. It shows a woman holding up a child with a moon in the background. It is from the collection of Michael Hunt.

- Tonto

Uncle Jerry make a brief reference to Tonto when he talks to Lucie about Indian names. Tonto was a Native American character on the television show The Lone Ranger.

== Literary techniques ==
- Italicized text

Bell uses italicized text liberally in Faces in the Moon. The italicized portions of the book are dedicated to times of intense emotion rather than the facts that make up the backbone of the story. It is important to notice when Bell utilizes italics. She uses it in the horrendous rape scene between Lucie and J.D as well as in Lucie's dreams when she is running from the wild dogs. Changing from regular font to italicized font signals the reader to pay attention to the differences between the two. Bell uses italics to not only convey powerful feeling but also as an escape for Lucie. For example, when Lucie wants to hear her mother's words, she "hears" them through the italicized text. However, she can also use the italicized words as a way to escape unpleasant feelings by dismissing them as dreams.

- Language and diction

Bell's choice of language and diction helps to form a story reminiscent of an oral narrative. Gracie and Rozella's conversation at the kitchen table is one of the best examples of this literary technique. Bell gives her characters certain attributes that allow readers to easily connect to the story. Rozella and Gracie talk over a cup of coffee and a cigarette. They use slang and other expressions that make them relatable to readers. This technique is so rampant throughout the novel that I have identified it as a theme. For more information on oral storytelling in Faces in the Moon, please see the listing under Major Themes.

== Criticism ==
Literary critics have commented on both the novel's structure as well as thematic content of Faces in the Moon. Below are sections taken from published criticism.

- In what seems to be an effort to capture the psychological processes of memory coupled with the dynamism of storytelling, the novel presents a series of non-chronological episodes conveyed through first- and third-person narrative perspectives. The text is frequently interrupted by italicized snippets of conversations, memories, dreams, and fanciful thoughts, all of which are presumably important aspects of Lucie's identity as it is being reconstructed; unfortunately, the relevance of these textual fragments is not always clear, and the structure of the novel alone is not enough to sustain the reader's interest in the fictional world. Characters who tell stories are expected, even welcome in a novel structured around the ritual of storytelling. However, so much exposition comes directly from the mouths of the characters, their conversations often appear implausible. Some characters seem to function merely as vehicles for imparting information, rather than interesting individuals with meaningful lives. In addition, an overreliance on trite and commonplace utterances seems an injustice to the uneducated, rural characters of the novel. Overall the narrative is hindered with explanation when drama is wanted. It is curious to note that the stories recast in the novel, stories that are central to the reconstruction of Lucie's identity, often conjure up the reified mythic image of the Native American. For example, reticence and pride, qualities that have been ascribed to the American Indian as invented by outside cultures, are given credence in such phrases as, "that, my mother said, was the Indian in her" (p. 13). As a result, Lucie's remembering, or reconstruction of her Indian identity is tainted with a sense of falsehood, of the stereotypical. But more to the point, Lucie's self-discovery and reconciliation with the traditional past, her Cherokee heritage, is ultimately undermined by the ease with which it occurs. Never is it convincingly established that she has suffered estrangement from the world as a result of her childhood experiences; never is it established that her identity is in need of reconstruction, or rearticulation. It thus remains for Bell to create a cast of characters who are worthy of the thematic concerns evinced in Faces in the Moon.
- In time Lucie learned to communicate with nature and glimpsed the healing presence of the red earth of Oklahoma. Red, the color that symbolizes power and victory to the Cherokee, appears several times in association with Lizzie's home and in conjunction with Lucie's sickness. In a matter of a few pages red is revealed in bursts of color as a gift of a red jawbreaker, a red shawl, and in the repeated phrase "To tsu hwa ha tlv we da" (Redbird, where have you been?). In a dream image her grandmother healed Lucie, but as an adult Lucie states that she remained cut off from Oklahoma, the Cherokee people, and God. At first reading, the ending seems unnecessary and detracts from the book. However, after reflection, it clearly serves the important purpose of illustrating the continuing cycle of fear and abuse, as Lucie threatens "a pink middle-aged man" at the Oklahoma Historical Society. Lucie has suffered so much throughout her life but is now in a position of power to dish out the grief, as the cycle continues.
- Told largely in flashbacks by Lucie, who has returned home following her hated mother's stroke, the novel is elegantly written in spare prose replete with meaningful details and realistic dialogue. Bell, herself a Cherokee, deeply understands the culture she writes about and conveys that understanding unobtrusively, yet with great emotional power.
