= Kahentinetha =

Mohawk political activist and fashion model

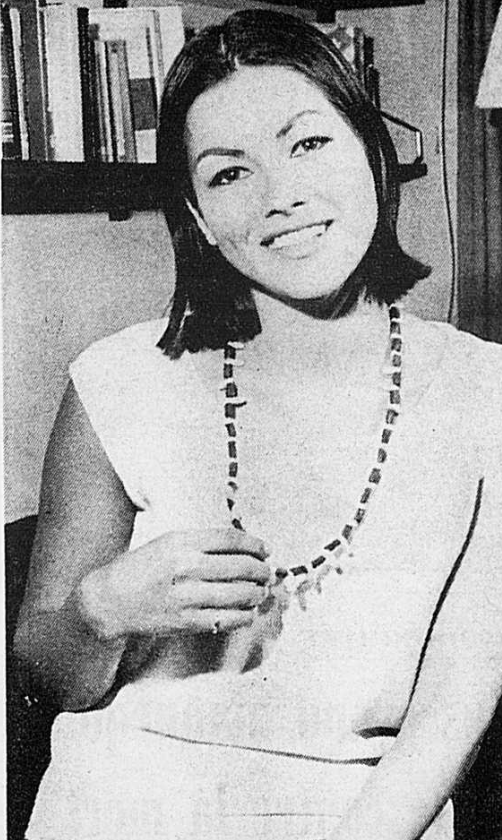
- Kahentinetha in 1963.

Mohawk leader

Personal details
- Born: April 16, 1940 (age 86) Brooklyn, New York, U.S.
- Children: 4, including Waneek Horn-Miller and Kaniehtiio Horn

Kahentinetha, also known as Kahn-Tineta, Horn (born April 16, 1940, New York City), is an American writer, editor, political activist, former civil servant in the Department of Indian Affairs and Northern Development and former fashion model. She is a member of the Mohawk Bear Clan of Kahnawake.

Kahentinetha was a notable participant in the 1990 Oka Crisis. Her daughter, Waneek Horn-Miller, then aged 15, was stabbed in the chest by a soldier's bayonet while holding her younger sister, Kaniehtiio, then aged 4; a photograph of the incident, published on the front page of newspapers, symbolized the standoff between Mohawks and the Canadian government. Waneek became a broadcaster, and co-captain of Canada's first women's national water polo team at the 2000 Summer Olympics in Sydney. Kaniehtiio is now a film and television actress. Her eldest daughter, Dr. Ojistoh Horn, is a traditionally minded family medicine physician in Akwesasne.

Kahentinetha has been editing the Mohawk Nation News service since 1990, and contributed to several publications including editing the oral history compendium The Mohawk Warrior Society: A Handbook on Sovereignty and Survival. She is one of the plaintiffs regrouped within the Kanien’kehà:ka Kahnistensera's legal case against McGill University and other defendants, resulting in an injunction halting development on the grounds of the former Royal Victoria Hospital to search for unmarked graves of victims of the MKUltra experiments.

== Biography ==
In the 1960s and early 1970s, Kahentinetha became widely known for her criticisms of anti-native racism and government policy regarding First Nations peoples, and for her advocacy of native separatism. She was involved in the 1962 Conference on Indian Poverty in Washington D.C., the blocking of the International Bridge at Akwesasne in 1968, and other indigenous rights campaigns.

Kahentinetha caught the attention of the media in 1964, when she was "deposed as a Director of the National Indian Council, and as Indian Princess of Canada." By 1972, her separatist views had appeared in the pages of The Harvard Crimson and The New Yorker, and she had been interviewed by The Webster Reports of KVOS-TV, a Bellingham, Washington station which broadcasts to Vancouver, British Columbia.

Kahentinetha has appeared in two short films, Artisans de notre histoire, Volume 2: Les Explorateurs (1995) and David Thompson: The Great Mapmaker (1964). She has served as publisher of the Mohawk Nation News. She has served as Director of the Canadian Alliance in Solidarity with Native Peoples and coordinator of the Free Wolverine Campaign.

In 2002, she gave a speech at the "You Are on Native Land Conference" at McGill University titled, How Canada violated the BNA Act to Steal Native Land: The Forgotten Arguments of Deskaheh.

In 2006, Kahentinetha was one of two women who submitted a "notice of seizure" to the developers of the Melancthon Wind Farm near Shelburne, Ontario on behalf of the Haudenosaunee, and taught a history class at Concordia University in Montreal.

In 2008, at age 68, she suffered a heart attack while "handcuffed in a police stress hold" at the Cornwall/Akwesasne border crossing.
