= Kanehsatake: 270 Years of Resistance =

- Directed by: Alanis Obomsawin
- Written by: Alanis Obomsawin
- Produced by: Wolf Koenig; Colin Neale
- Starring: Alanis Obomsawin
- Cinematography: François Brault; Zoe Dirse
- Edited by: Yurij Luhovy
- Music by: Francis Grandmont; Claude Vendette
- Production company: ACPAV
- Release date: 28 January 1993 (Febio Film Festival)
- Running time: 119 minutes
- Country: Canada
- Language: English

Kanehsatake: 270 Years of Resistance is a 1993 feature-length documentary film by Alanis Obomsawin, highlighting the events of the 1990 Oka Crisis. Obomsawin documents the events of The Siege of Kanehsatake over 78 days, capturing a rare perspective of an important turning point in Canadian history. Produced by the National Film Board of Canada, the film won 18 Canadian and international awards, including the Distinguished Documentary Achievement Award from the International Documentary Association and the CITY TV Award for Best Canadian Feature Film from the Toronto Festival of Festivals.

== Synopsis ==
Obomsawin's film, Kanehsatake: 270 Years of Resistance, documents the boiling point of Indigenous land possession battles of the last 270 years. The conflict arises when the Quebec government announces to expand the golf course it had previously built on Mohawk land. The expansion would destroy the sacred burial ground located in their land of "The Pines". This news led to the Mohawk community creating barricades to protect The Pines and block access to the Mercier Bridge. The siege began in March 1990, and tensions rose during a confrontation between the Mohawk Warriors and the Sûreté du Quebec (SQ); police raided Mohawk territory. Gunshots were fired and Corporal Marcel Lemay from the Quebec Provincial Police was shot dead. The opening of the film displays the central conflict which is the direct result of the shoot-out on July 11, 1990. The film portrays an Indigenous perspective of this historical event; capturing 250 hours of footage in order to give agency to her people that were being misrepresented in common mass media.

The documentary enlightens audiences to the mistreatment and brutal force received by Mohawks from the Canadian Armed Forces:

“She and her crew filmed clashes with the military; the army stopping food from reaching the land defenders; some locals hanging and burning an effigy of a warrior; a mob of Châteauguay residents stoning cars belonging to Kanien’kehá:ka, containing mostly women and children, with rocks the size of fists, windows shattering, glass shards lodged in skin, an elderly man hit in the chest, shirtless men cheering. She interviewed the Kanien’kehá:ka women on the front lines of the standoff with the federal and provincial governments. She documented the protests held in solidarity with the Kanehsata’kehró:non. And she filmed the army’s tanks pushing into Kanien’kehá:ka territory.”

== Production ==
In a video interview for the 'NFB Pause series' celebrating the 25th anniversary of the film, Alanis Obomsawin recounts,

“I was working on another film, I was driving my car I was on my way to the film board, and I hear on CBC news: a shoot out in Kanehsatake. You could hear the sound of the guns, so I went straight there instead of going to the film board. By the time I got there in Oka, you weren’t allowed to go into the village and the police had a barricade there, and that was it. So I went back to the film board and I said: I’m changing my production I got to go and document this. (00:00:32- 00:01:39)”

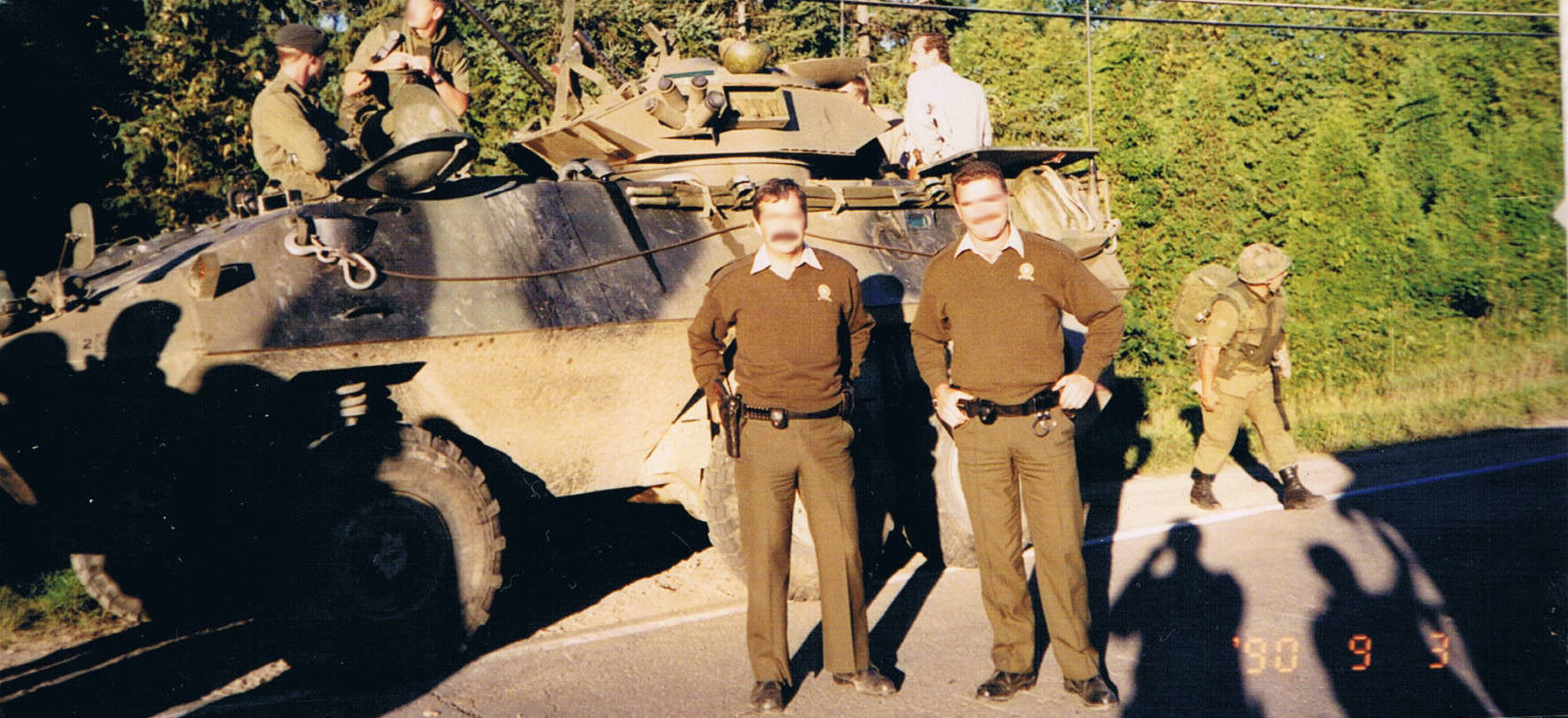
Two SQ officers during Kanehsatake Siege.

It took several days before Alanis was able to cross the barricade to be with the Mohawk community and the Warriors. Not knowing how the conflict would develop, Obomsawin captured the rest of the siege. The Siege of Kanehsatake was the largest amount of troops deployed in an Indigenous rights issue.

The production conditions that Obomsawin and her film crew were subjected to were less than favourable. The filmmaker herself admitted to feeling afraid for her life. Obomsawin and the Mohawk community faced many sleepless nights as well as fleeing from attacks from the army. After a cameraman left the scene in fear of his safety, Obomsawin took charge and adjusted to using the equipment herself. Obomsawin also recalls an account of verbal harassment while shooting, being referred to as "squaw" by the soldiers, a derogatory slur implying a woman that can be assaulted and beat. She continuously reminded herself the reason why she was there: for her people. She needed to keep documenting the situation, to keep composure and therefore, never turned any insults back when speaking to authority figures.

=== Film techniques ===
The film's subjective style is contrary to early Indigenous documentary works where they were the subjects being observed and preserved with a Western ethnographic gaze. “Obomsawin’s subjective style is what makes her films so important simply because they are about her, and her people, supplying her own images and commentary”. Alanis Obomsawin is the narrator in Kanehsatake: 270 Years of Resistance. She is the one who tells the story and long history of land appropriation by colonizers in North America, inviting the audience to re-read history She uses her voice and archival footage to properly demonstrate how history has continued to repeat itself, considering the events of Oka recall the failures of old treaties in Canada.

== Release ==
Rejected by Mark Starowicz of CBC Television, the film premiered in England, instead, on Channel Four. Kanehsatake: 270 Years of Resistance made its North American premiere at the Toronto Festival of Festivals.

In his book, Alanis Obomsawin: The Vision of a Native Filmmaker, film scholar Randolph Lewis writes:

When the film was released in 1993, the CBC continued its long-standing neglect of Obomsawin's work, in this case arguing that she needed to slice thirty minutes from the two-hour film to make room for commercial breaks. [..] Colin Neale, the executive producer who worked with Obomsawin on the film, rebuffed the network's demand. [...] Eventually, public interest in Kahnesatake overpowered the CBC's bureaucratic reluctance, and the network aired it on January 31, 1994.

Brian McIlroy, in his chapter on Kanehsatake: 270 Years of Resistance for the book The Cinema of Canada, states that:

It is clear that without Obomsawin's 1993 film, the history of Oka circa 1990 would be dominated by [Prime Minister Brian] Mulroney's assertion, reproduced in the documentary, that the armed Mohawks were criminals and illegally wielding weapons.

In 2021 the film was selected for inclusion in Celebrating Alanis, a retrospective program of Obomsawin's films at the 2021 Toronto International Film Festival.

== Critical response ==
=== Community ===
The film's production ultimately had an effect on the Mohawk community of Oka as well as Indigenous communities across North America. News stories contained a biased Western perspective. The documentary is evidence of the Mohawk experience. It provided an outlet for a perspective that was commonly misrepresented and distorted. Obomsawin discussed the impact of the film and the incidents in Oka 25 years later with the National Film Board of Canada:

“…At the time the racism became so big here, […] you couldn’t go just anywhere without being pushed or insulted. So, it was even more important to make sure that it’s documented by some of us. This film became a turning point because of the content. Because of what happened. Every reservation in this country or almost every one of them, have lost land by always the municipality. And when the resistance was done in Kanehsatake, this is when it became a turning point. It gave courage to all the reserves and not to allow that to happen anymore. (00:01:30-00:02:13)

Obomsawin's choice to stay with the community throughout the siege and document the brutalities also seemed to de-escalate the situation: "some believe Obomsawin’s continued presence with a camera likely tempered the army—that things would have been worse if she weren’t there filming.” Jesse Wente, founding director of the Indigenous Screen Office and chair of the board of the Canada Council for the Arts stated that:

“The film marked a watershed moment in the history of Indigenous cinema, [...] Without Kanehsatake: 270 Years of Resistance, “it’s hard to imagine the understanding Canadians would have of what happened there, [...] In most other coverage at the time, “we did not hear from the people behind the line.”

The film helped to develop a universal sentiment, Karen Froman an Indigenous scholar, explains: “the processes of colonization and rapid urbanization in the postwar period has ripped Indigenous peoples from their homelands, yet in many ways we remain connected to the land no matter where we may reside. I know where I come from even though I may not physically reside there.”

=== National Film Board of Canada ===
During the 1940s and 1950s, the National Film Board of Canada's regarding Indigenous communities portrayed them under an ethnographic lens; as a vanishing culture. Obomsawin's NFB produced film is significant as it contradicts this ideology constructed by the film board. She opposes the objectivity of NFB documentary journalistic filmmaking by abandoning the classic "voice of god" narration style and making her point of view very apparent.

== See also ==
- Ellen Gabriel
