= Seeds (2024 film) =

- Film poster
- Directed by: Kaniehtiio Horn
- Screenplay by: Kaniehtiio Horn
- Produced by: Leonard Farlinger; Jennifer Jonas
- Starring: Kaniehtiio Horn; Graham Greene; Meegwun Fairbrother
- Cinematography: Jonathon Cliff
- Edited by: Lindsay Allikas
- Music by: Alaska B
- Production companies: Carpe Dee Yum Productions; New Real Films; Kaniehtiio Horn-Batt Entertainment
- Distributed by: Levelfilm
- Release date: September 6, 2024 (TIFF)
- Running time: 82 minutes
- Country: Canada
- Language: English
- Box office: $42,050

Seeds is a 2024 Canadian comedy thriller film, written and directed by Kaniehtiio Horn. The film stars Horn as Ziggy, a young Mohawk woman trying to establish herself as a social media influencer; after she is offered a contract with a seed company, she is summoned home by her cousin to housesit while her family is out of town, only to have to battle someone who is trying to steal crops from the family garden.

The film, Horn's directorial debut, was described by Horn as a "home invasion comedy" inspired by Home Alone and Shaun of the Dead. Its cast also includes Graham Greene, Patrick Garrow, Peter Keleghan, Dallas Goldtooth, Meegwun Fairbrother, Morgan Bedard, Josh Bainbridge, Dylan Cook, Cherish Violet Blood and Kawennakon Bonnie Whitlow.

The film premiered in the Discovery program at the 2024 Toronto International Film Festival.

== Reception ==
On the review aggregator website Rotten Tomatoes, 100% of 14 critics' reviews are positive, with an average rating of 6.9/10.

Alex Hudson of Exclaim! rated the film 7 out of 10, writing that "a cutting commentary and an inviting glimpse into life in a small Kanienʼkehá:ka community, Seeds doesn't quite sprout into a fully realized film, but it's a promising beginning for a budding cinematic talent."

Jason Gorber of Collider wrote: "On its surface, Seeds is a pulpy romp, mixing broad comedy, chilling moments of dread, and full-on revenge horror to make for an entertaining grindhouse mashup. Yet beyond the buckets of blood and eco-friendly messaging, there is much that’s more profound element to spy the closer one looks. From the casual mixing of Native and colonial languages shifting mid-phrase, to the bemused recognition of the charms and structural challenges of reservation life, there’s a casual sardonicism that’s infectious."

In Bloody Disgusting, Joe Lipsett wrote: "Overall, Seeds works better as a comedy than a revenge thriller, though seeing Ziggy fight back against white colonial oppression is cathartic and empowering. In that capacity, Seeds offers something unique and completely accessible to audiences who are less familiar with (particularly contemporary) Indigenous narratives. At its core, Seeds is a mostly fun, slightly inconsistent comedy revenge thriller with a truly great lead performance by Horn."

The film was named to TIFF's annual Canada's Top Ten list for 2024.

=== Awards ===
The film won the 2024 Jean-Marc Vallée DGC Discovery Award.

The film received four nominations at the 13th Canadian Screen Awards, winning one for Best Performance in a Supporting Role, Comedy (Graham Greene).

== Release ==
Seeds was released theatrically in Canada by Levelfilm on October 25, 2024.

Prestige International Pictures acquired the international rights to the film and launched sales at the Marché du Film during the Cannes Film Festival.
