= Betty Louise Bell =

American author and educator

Betty Louise Bell (born November 23, 1949, in Davis, Oklahoma) is an American author and educator. She is a scholar and fiction writer of Cherokee ancestry. She earned her PhD in 1985 from Ohio State University.

== Works ==
Bell published an autobiographical novel Faces in the Moon in 1994 in which an abused "mixed-blood Cherokee" protagonist, named Lucie, has no access to nostalgic stereotypes about Native Americans in the United States but still finds an identity. In the protagonists mind, the contemporary stereotype is that of poverty and ghettoization, but the protagonist is asked by white friends: "What's it like being Indian".

== Career ==
Bell is a former director of the Native American Studies Program and former assistant professor of American culture, English, and Women's Studies at the University of Michigan. Her areas of scholarly interest include Native American literature, Women's Studies, 19th-century American literature, and creative writing. Bell has published critical articles on Native American Literature that emphasize the political and personal aspects of Native American identity.

=== Academic publications ===
1. A Red Girl's Reasoning: Native American Women Writers and the Twentieth Century
2. Reading Red: Feminism in Native America (Editor)
3. Norton Anthology of Native America Literatures (Coeditor)
