= Deer Woman =

Spirit in various forms of Native American mythology

Deer Woman, sometimes known as the Deer Lady, is a spirit in various Indigenous American mythologies whose associations and qualities vary, depending on situation and relationships. But generally to men who have harmed women and children, she is vengeful and murderous, and known to lure these men to their deaths. She appears as either a beautiful young woman with deer feet or as a deer.

As Native political goals and social movements continue to expand in response to the increasing violence against Indigenous women, new retellings of Deer Woman's story have emerged. Contrary to her traditional narrations, Deer Woman has been reimagined within the framework of missing and murdered Indigenous women, abandoning her image as a murderous seductress for that of a self-saving hero acting out of necessity.

== Overview ==
Deer Woman stories are found in multiple Indigenous American cultures, often told to young children or by young adults and preteens in the communities of the Lakota people (Oceti Sakowin), Ojibwe, Ponca, Omaha, Cherokee, Muscogee, Seminole, Choctaw, Otoe, Osage, Pawnee, and Haudenosaunee—and those are only the nations that have documented Deer Woman sightings.

Though Deer Woman can be malevolent towards humans, her role in Indigenous culture is to uphold traditional society by keeping humans in line by discouraging harmful actions that have the potential to destroy the community. The legend of Deer Woman in particular pushes them away from actions like promiscuity and infidelity. As an example of what happens when these spiritual rules are broken, the people who incur the wrath of Deer Woman and her uncle, Thunder, soon die.

Some stories describe the sighting of Deer Woman as a sign of personal transformation or as a warning. Deer Woman is said to be fond of dancing and will sometimes join a communal dance unnoticed, leaving only when the drum beating ceases.

== Lakota perspective ==
Among Lakota people, Deer Woman (Sinte Sapela Win) is one manifestation of Anukite, who has three variations of existence in Lakota oral traditions. The daughter of the first man and first woman was a beautiful young woman named Ite (Face). Tate (Wind) fell in love with her. They married and had quadruplets, who were the Four Winds. Ite wished to become a god and enlisted the aid of Inktomi, the trickster spider, who caused the Sun to fall in love with Ite. At a celebration, Ite sat in the place of the Moon, the Sun's wife. To punish her disrespect, the Sky cast Ite down from heaven to the earth. Half of her face became ugly and her name became Anukite (Double Face Woman) or Winyan Numpa (Double Woman).

Anukite as Sinte Sapela Win appears to men in dreams or visions, either as a single deer or two deer women: a white-tailed deer and a black-tailed deer. Her two different sides symbolize appropriate and inappropriate sexual relations. Men that have sex with her are believed to go insane while women that dream of her will have strong powers or sexual attraction or can gain artistic powers if they make a wise choice in the near future.

== Cultural impacts ==
In 2017, 5,712 Indigenous women and girls were reported missing in the U.S.; more recently, in 2022, 5,487 cases were reported. This demonstrates the sustained violence Indigenous women are being subjected to across all age groups as it is reported 84.3% of all Indigenous women in the U.S. have experienced violence in their lifetime. From this violence have emerged grassroots movements, like the Coalition to Stop Violence Against Native Women (CSVANW) and Missing and Murdered Indigenous Women (MMIWG), whose calls for Native visibility, safety, and justice have inspired followers of these political and social movements to turn to traditional stories for their representative. With her teachings on self-defense and adherence to traditional Indigenous values, Deer Woman's story has captured the attention of activists, scholars, and community members due to her physical and cultural resistance to colonial subjugation.

=== Internalized decolonization ===
Deer Woman's origin as a cautionary tale against promiscuity and other forms of sexual taboos equips her character with the agency and cultural adherence necessary to stand up to the men she has been historically associated with and physically punish them for their moral deviance. These same strengths are similarly imperative to the communal goal among Native societies to decolonize their thinking and relationships.

The violence against indigenous communities has been identified as a consequence of the violent legacy of colonialism as it permeates social and legal structures within the United States and Canada, and damages relationships among Indigenous men and women. The violence threatening women does not always come from outside the community, as community members and scholars have identified a portion of perpetrators to be Native men who have adopted colonial mindsets and its objectification of Indigenous women, having also developed a fetish for obtaining and sustaining power. Colonialism's lingering influence has distorted Native masculinity as it is no longer shaped by traditional values and ceremonies that honor and respect women and two-spirited people under the tradition of "gynocratic governance", and has been replaced by colonial patriarchy despite its disruption of an imperative value to Indigenous ideology: kinship. Colonial ideologies have distanced Indigenous men from their communities, making the fight against the violence weaker and the healing process for victims longer. By returning to traditional teachings and ceremonies, Indigenous men and women can use their community and cultural knowledge to learn healthy sexual behaviors and reestablish healthy relationships in and outside their community.

=== Returning to communal healing ===
Deer Woman's calls for a stronger community, as well as a cultural identity strengthened by traditional knowledge and ceremonies, empower her followers to reject the title of "victim" and allow them to continue healing within a healthy and supportive environment. The modern Deer Woman narrative encourages active self-determination. It affirms the strength found in cultural resilience through her commitment to protecting herself and her community, despite experiencing the violence herself. Her story teaches that resistance begins with the refusal to internalize the ideologies behind violence and the assertion of one's right to heal, act, and belong on one's own terms.

=== Seeking autonomy ===
Not only does Deer Woman's history of abuse resonate with community members in the process of healing, but her strict adherence to traditional values and her rejection of colonial ideologies also support the larger goals of communal well-being and self-determination. Traditional knowledge not only provides a corrective to harmful behaviors but also furnishes Indigenous communities with a foundational framework for self-determination. Despite persistent barriers to the recognition of tribal sovereignty in both the United States and Canada, a return to Indigenous traditions and governance structures offers a powerful means of reclaiming autonomy, protecting women, girls, and two-spirited individuals, and pursuing justice on cultural terms.

Deer Woman equips Indigenous individuals with the values and community to counter systemic violence and provides a framework for reclaiming agency, restoring relational balance, and rebuilding Indigenous futures through the revitalization of tradition, kinship, and collective resistance.

== Similar figures ==
Deer Woman and the other Little People share similarities with some European supernatural beings such as the Gaelic Aos Sí and Tuatha Dé Danann, the Germanic elves, and the Slavic víle and rusalki in that they hold otherworldly knowledge that they can pass on to humans if they are treated with respect and said human(s) deemed worthy. Special care is taken to avoid angering them or breaking their rules as their vengeance is unpleasant and often deadly.

La Patasola, literally "single footed", is a somewhat similar figure from the Antioquia region of Colombia in that she brings harm to men who harm what she cares about, in this case, the forest. She is a shapeshifter who takes the form of a beautiful woman to lure men with her cries of fear. When the men, who are often causing harm in one way or another to the rain forest, come to her, she drops her beautiful mask and slaughters them in an effort to protect the forest.

== See also ==
- Reservation Dogs (2021–2023) – Deer Lady (played by Kaniehtiio "Tiio" Horn) is a recurring character.
  - "Deer Lady" is a Deer Woman–centric episode of Reservation Dogs that tells her origin story.
- "Deer Woman" (2005, the 7th episode of the 1st season of Masters of Horror) – Deer Woman (played by Cinthia Moura) is the antagonist.
