= List of horror films of the 1970s =

Horror films released in the 1970s are listed in the following articles:

- List of horror films of 1970
- List of horror films of 1971
- List of horror films of 1972
- List of horror films of 1973
- List of horror films of 1974
- List of horror films of 1975
- List of horror films of 1976
- List of horror films of 1977
- List of horror films of 1978
- List of horror films of 1979
