= Kaniehtiio Horn =

Canadian actress (born 1985)

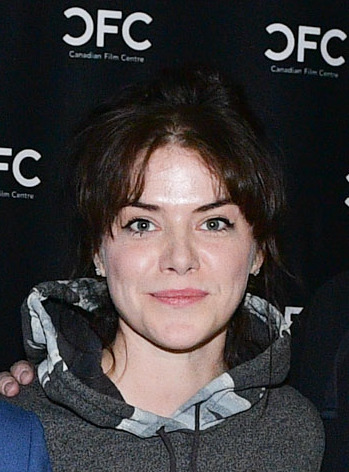
- Horn in April 2018
- Born: Kaniehtiio Alexandra Jessie Batt; November 8, 1985 (age 40); Ottawa, Ontario, Canada
- Other name: Tiio Horn
- Education: Dawson College
- Occupations: Actress, film director, screenwriter
- Years active: 2004–present
- Children: 2
- Mother: Kahentinetha
- Relatives: Waneek Horn-Miller (half-sister)

Kaniehtiio Alexandra Jessie Horn (née Batt; Mohawk pronunciation: [ɡanjehˈdiːjo]; born November 8, 1985), also credited as Tiio Horn, is a Canadian First Nations (Kahnawake Mohawk) actress and filmmaker. She is the daughter of political activist Kahn-Tineta Horn and the half-sibling of athlete Waneek Horn-Miller. She is known to television audiences for her roles as Tanis on Letterkenny (2016–2023), Monica Bellow on 18 to Life (2010–11), Destiny Rumancek on Hemlock Grove (2013–2015), Gina on The Man in the High Castle (2016–18) and Deer Lady on Reservation Dogs (2021–2023).

Horn is a two-time Canadian Screen Award winner for her work on Letterkenny. She won a Directors Guild of Canada Award for her feature directorial debut, the horror comedy Seeds (2024).

== Early life ==
Horn was born in Ottawa and grew up in Ottawa and on the Kahnawake Mohawk reserve outside of Montreal. Her mother, Kahentinetha, also known as Kahn-Tineta Horn, is a Mohawk former model and a political activist for the Kahnawake First Nation. Her father, who is of German and Scottish descent, is a lawyer. Horn, her mother and her older half-sister Waneek (co-captain of the Canadian women's water polo team at the 2000 Sydney Olympics and later a broadcaster) were notable participants in the 1990 Oka Crisis. Waneek was stabbed in the chest by a soldier wielding a bayonet while holding Horn, who was then aged four; a photograph of the incident, published on the front page of newspapers, symbolized the standoff between Mohawks and the Canadian government.

Horn decided to be an actress at a young age, but concentrated on swimming and water polo as a teenager. She graduated from Dawson College in 2005 for theatre arts, and appeared in a number of short films.

== Career ==
Horn's first film acting credit was in 2006 for the CBC television mini-series Indian Summer: The Oka Crisis (for which she had been present at the real-life event sixteen years earlier).

Horn landed a role in the 2007 drama film The Colony, directed by Jeff Barnaby. In 2008, she appeared in the TV film Moccasin Flats: Redemption and was nominated for a Gemini Award for her role. She also appeared in Journey to the Center of the Earth that year, also starring Brendan Fraser.

In 2009, Horn starred in The Trotsky, directed by Jacob Tierney, playing a Montreal high school student. In Web of Lies, a TV movie about a cybersecurity specialist accused of fraud, she played a hacker named Spider. She appeared in The Wild Hunt, directed by Alexandre Franchi and in Reginald Harkema's Leslie, My Name Is Evil as a member of Charles Manson's death cult. The three Canadian films were selected for the Festival du Nouveau Cinéma. The Trotsky and The Wild Hunt made the Top 10 Canadian films list at the 2009 Toronto International Film Festival.

Horn starred in the CBC television sitcom 18 to Life as Monica Bellow. The series was picked up by the CW network and it aired in the US in August 2010. Horn filmed a second season in Montreal in mid-2010.

Horn voiced several roles in By the Rapids, an APTN cartoon which she had made in collaboration with Joseph Tekaroniake Lazare. She also shot an APTN television pilot, Escape Hatch, with Mohawk writer-director Tracey Deer. In 2010, Horn again worked with Jacob Tierney in the film Good Neighbours. She starred in the low-budget slasher film A Flesh Offering, directed by Jeremy Torrie, playing an artist who gets lost in the woods.

In 2011, Horn starred in the horror anthology film The Theatre Bizarre, and played a priestess in Immortals. She filmed Penthouse North with Michelle Monaghan and Michael Keaton and shot a CBC comedy pilot. In 2012, Horn joined the cast of the Netflix drama Hemlock Grove as Destiny Rumancek, a Romani witch. She starred opposite Famke Janssen, Dougray Scott, Bill Skarsgård, Landon Liboiron and Lili Taylor in the series.

Horn voiced the role of Kaniehtí:io, the Native American protagonist's (Ratohnhake:ton) Mohawk mother, in the 2012 video game Assassin's Creed III, developed by Ubisoft. The same year, she wrote and directed her debut film, The Smoke Shack, in association with the National Screen Institute. In 2013, Horn played Rynn, an Irathient spirit rider, on the Syfy TV series, Defiance, and played Dorothy from The Wizard of Oz in "Slumber Party", an episode of the CW series Supernatural. She also appeared in Embrace of the Vampire starring Sharon Hinnendael, a remake of the 1995 horror film of the same name, in the television special Gavin Crawford's Wild West and in the Amazon series The Man in the High Castle (TV Series).

Horn appeared in a recurring role as Tanis in the CraveTV series Letterkenny, for which she won the Canadian Screen Award for Best Supporting Actress in a Comedy Series at the 10th Canadian Screen Awards in 2022. Horn has also taken up the role of Consulting Producer on the Letterkenny spinoff show Shoresy, where she was tasked with ensuring the faithful portrayal of the show's many Indigenous characters.

In 2020, Horn appeared as a panelist on Canada Reads advocating for Eden Robinson's novel Son of a Trickster.

From 2021–2023, she played a recurring role as Deer Lady in the FX/Hulu show Reservation Dogs.

In 2022, Horn appeared in a recurring role as Feather Day in season 2 of the Peacock series Rutherford Falls.

Seeds, her debut film as a director, premiered in the Discovery program at the 2024 Toronto International Film Festival, and was longlisted for the 2024 Jean-Marc Vallée DGC Discovery Award.

== Personal life ==
Horn has two children, a son born in November 2020 and a daughter born in November 2024.

== Filmography ==
=== Film ===
==== Feature films ====
Year	Title	Role	Notes
2008	Journey to the Center of the Earth	Gum-Chewing Girl	
2008	South of the Moon	Mysterious Woman	
2009	The Trotsky	Caroline	Credited as 'Tiio Horn'
2009	The Wild Hunt	Princess Evlynia/Lyn	Credited as 'Tiio Horn'
2009	Leslie, My Name Is Evil	Patricia "Katie" Krenwinkel	
2010	Good Neighbours	Johanne	
2010	A Flesh Offering	Jennifer Morrisseau	
2011	The Theatre Bizarre	The Writer	Segment: "Vision Stains"
2011	Gene-Fusion	Cho (voice)	
2011	See How They Dance	La femme kaska	Credited as 'Kanietillo Horn'
2011	Immortals	High Priestess	
2012	On the Road	Rita Bettancourt	Credited as 'Tiio Horn'
2013	Embrace of the Vampire	Nicole	Credited as 'Tiio Horn'
2014	Penthouse North	Blake	Credited as 'Tiio Horn'
2017	Mohawk	Okwaho	
2018	22 Chaser	Avery Dankert	
2018	The Hummingbird Project	Barbara Lehman	Credited as 'Tiio Horn'
2018	Death Wish	Natasha	Credited as 'Tiio Horn'
2020	Possessor	Reeta	
2020	Sugar Daddy	Jenny	
2022	Alice, Darling	Tess	
2023	Who's Yer Father?	Nicole Thorne	
2024	Seeds	Ziggy	Also writer and director
2026	Seventeen	Layla	

==== Short films ====
Year	Title	Role	Notes
2004	Might of the Starchaser		
2006	Montreal Stories: 1971	Young Woman	
2007	The Colony	Myriam	
2009	Missing	Alice	
2010	Til Death...	Jessica	
2010	You Are So Undead	Chelsea	

=== Television ===
==== Television series ====
Year	Title	Role	Notes
2007	Les Hauts et les bas de Sophie Paquin	Réceptionniste	Episode: "Rêver en couleur"
2009–11	Doggy Day School	Rosie (voice)	Recurring role
2010	Mohawk Girls	Bailey	Episode: "Pilot"
2010–11	18 to Life	Monica Bellow	25 episodes; credited as 'Tiio Horn'
2011	Being Human	Lindsey	Episode: "It Takes Two to Make a Thing Go Wrong"
2011	By the Rapids	Bev Littlehorn/Grandma Hazel/Wendy (voices)	Episode: "Invasion at Turtle Island"
2012	Alphas	Trisha	Episode: "Alphaville"
2013	Supernatural	Dorothy Baum	Episode: "Slumber Party"; credited as 'Tiio Horn'
2013–14	Defiance	Rynn	6 episodes; credited as 'Tiio Horn'
2013–15	Hemlock Grove	Destiny Rumancek	27 episodes
2015	19-2	Sasha Renner	3 episodes; credited as 'Tiio Horn'
2016	The Strain	Kimberly	1 episode; credited as 'Tiio Horn'
2016–18	The Man in the High Castle	Gina	5 episodes; credited as 'Tiio Horn'
2016–23	Letterkenny	Tanis	20 episodes
2017	What Would Sal Do?	Nicole	6 episodes
2018	Ghost BFF	Tara	11 episodes
2019	Wayne	Kyra	Episode: "No Priests"; credited as 'Tiio Horn'
2019	Slasher	Coroner Lucie Cooper	4 episodes; credited as 'Tiio Horn'
2020	Barkskins	Mari	8 episodes
2021–23	Reservation Dogs	Deer Lady	3 episodes
2022	Rutherford Falls	Feather Day	5 episodes
2023	Telling Our Story	Narrator	Episodes: "True Story Parts 1 & 2"
2024–present	Grimsburg	Wynona Whitecloud (voice)	Recurring role
2025–present	The Lowdown	Samantha	Recurring role (season 1); main role (season 2)
TBA	Bishop †	Tasha Graves	Recurring role

==== Television films and miniseries ====
Year	Title	Role	Notes
2006	Indian Summer: The Oka Crisis	Susan Oke	
2007	Abducted: Fugitive for Love	Mindy	
2007	Too Young to Marry	Molly	Credited as 'Tiio Horn'
2007	Moccasin Flats: Redemption	Kayleigh	
2007	The Terrorist Next Door	Angel	
2009	Web of Lies	Spider	
2013	Gavin Crawford's Wild West	Shannon	
2015	The Fixer	Chloe	

=== Video games ===
Year	Title	Voice role	Notes
2012	Assassin's Creed III	Kaniehtí:io	
2013	Defiance	Rynn	

== Awards and nominations ==
Award	Year	Category	Work	Result
ACTRA Award	2010	Outstanding Performance - Female	The Trotsky	Won
ACTRA Award	2019	Outstanding Performance - Female	The Man in the High Castle	Nominated
American Indian Movie Award	2008	Best Supporting Actress	Moccasin Flats: Redemption	Nominated
American Indian Movie Award	2010	Best Actress	A Flesh Offering	Nominated
Canadian Screen Award	2021	Best Lead Performance, Web Program or Series	Ghost BFF	Nominated
Canadian Screen Award	2022	Best Supporting Actress in a Comedy Series	Letterkenny	Won
Canadian Screen Award	2024	Best Ensemble Performance in a Comedy Series	Letterkenny	Won
Canadian Screen Award	2025	Best Ensemble Performance in a Comedy Series	Letterkenny	Nominated
Canadian Screen Award	2025	Best Lead Performance in a Comedy Film	Seeds	Nominated
Canadian Screen Award	2025	Best Original Screenplay	Seeds	Nominated
Canadian Screen Award	2025	John Dunning Best First Feature Award	Seeds	Nominated
ImagineNATIVE Film and Media Arts Festival	2013	Drama Pitch Prize	Rats	Won
