= Peace Village (Winnipeg, Manitoba) =

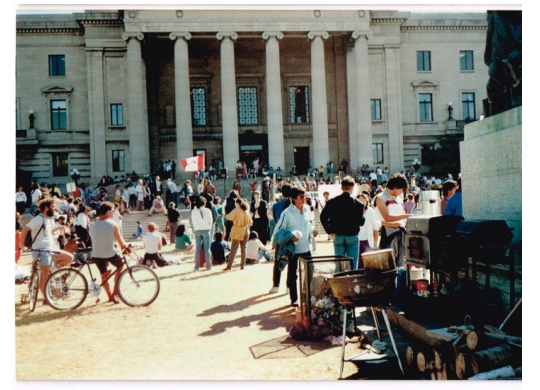
- View of the steps of the Manitoba Legislative Building from the centre of the Peace Village demonstration
- Date: September 1–26, 1990
- Location: Manitoba Legislative Building, Winnipeg, MB

The Peace Village in Winnipeg, Manitoba, was a peace camp set up by Indigenous activists in front of the provincial Legislative Building in 1990. Established on 1 September 1990, the temporary encampment was to remain indefinitely in anticipation of a peaceful resolution to the Oka Crisis.

The goal of the Peace Village was to show support for the Mohawks of Kanesatake and Kahnawake protesting near Oka Quebec and to call for a peaceful resolution in the armed standoff between them and the Canadian Armed Forces and Sûreté du Québec (SQ). There were further goals of the Winnipeg Peace Village, which included bringing attention to indigenous issues such as land claims, and to model a community of indigenous and non-indigenous people living together peacefully and cooperatively.

== Notable people ==
- George Erasmus — Grand Chief, Assembly of First Nations
- Phil Fontaine — Grand Chief, Assembly of Manitoba Chiefs
- Ovide Mercredi — Vice Chief of the Assembly of Manitoba Chiefs
- Gail Stacey-Moore — Native Women's Association of Canada
- Art Shofley — elder, Manitoba
- John Harvard — Member of Parliament (Liberal Party)
- Terry Nelson — Chief, Roseau River First Nations

== Lead up to the demonstration ==
As the Oka Crisis intensified, demonstrations, marches, and road blocks in solidarity with the protesters at Kanehsatake were held across the country. When Grand Chief of the Assembly of First Nations, George Erasmus sent a memo to all First Nations calling for more support, the demonstrations increased in frequency. On Saturday of Labour Day weekend, organizers in Winnipeg set up camp on the grounds of the provincial Legislative Building. During that first week, tensions continued to rise in Oka as the Canadian armed forces and the SQ raided the Longhouse in Kahnawake looking for weapons and then encircled the Mohawk Warriors at Kanehsatake with barbed wire fences and heavily armoured vehicles.

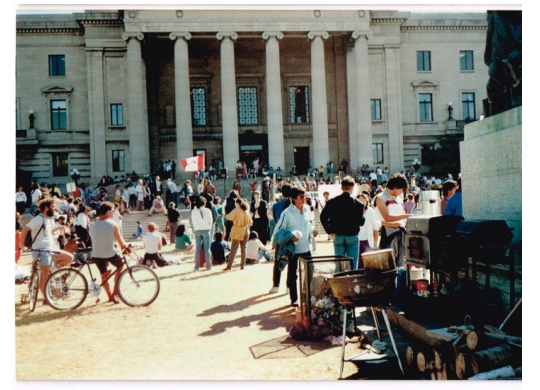
Photograph of Peace Village Demonstration in Winnipeg, Manitoba, Canada, 1990. View of the steps of the Manitoba Legislative Building from the centre of the Village.

== Demonstration ==
=== Leaders and initiators ===
The Peace Village was initiated by several groups in Winnipeg including the Assembly of Manitoba Chiefs (AMC) and the Original Women's Network. Co-chair and founding member of the Original Women's Network and Director of the AMC, Shirley Olson, passed away early on in the second week of September. There was a feast at the Peace Village to celebrate her life and work as an Indigenous activist. Phil Fontaine (leader of the AMC) was one of many speakers at the Peace Village and was steadfast in the AMC's position in favour of a peaceful negotiated settlement in the armed stand-off in Quebec.

=== Community involvement ===
As many as 150-200 Indigenous and non-Indigenous demonstrators including children and elders camped overnight at the Peace Village throughout the duration of the extended “sit in” on the grounds of the Manitoba Legislative Building. The Peace Village grew rapidly and by September 12, the Winnipeg Free Press reported that there were 39 tents, and 3 teepees. The three teepees were in the center of the village. The largest teepee was used as a medicine lodge and organizing center for volunteers and those who planned children's activities while the two smaller teepees served a symbolic purpose and were used for spiritual support and to emphasize Indigenous culture. There was up to 1,500 visitors who gathered throughout the days and evenings for speakers, ceremonies, singing, drumming, and dancing.

=== Allies, contributors, speakers ===
There were many speakers at the Peace Village including Phil Fontaine, Member of Parliament John Harvard, and Chief Terry Nelson of Roseau River First Nation. Security personnel from the Legislative Building was helpful and allowed demonstrators to access the building for warmth, shelter, water, and washroom facilities. Australian rock band Midnight Oil’s lead singer Peter Garrett toured the Peace Village while in Winnipeg for a concert and was welcomed by the AMC with a traditional song and dance and presented him with a native blanket. He spoke saying, “Midnight oil is a band that doesn’t take lightly the ceremony just presented. We happen to believe that the first stage in mending the planet is the recognition of the rights of indigenous peoples.” Environmental organization Manitoba Eco-Network issued a statement demanding that Prime Minister Brian Mulroney recall Parliament to solve the crisis in Oka. Their statement of support was endorsed by numerous groups including Concerned Citizens of Manitoba, Greenpeace, the Manitoba chapter of the Sierra Club and Project Peacemakers.

=== Non-violent action ===
The Peace Village was a non-violent demonstration which lasted several weeks in support of the Mohawk Nation in the Oka Crisis. Demonstrators used public speeches, prayers, ceremonies, and song and dance to bring awareness not only to the Oka Crisis but also to issues of social justice and indigenous rights. They used the concept of “show not tell” by creating a village with Indigenous and Non-Indigenous people with the goal of modelling a peaceful relationship between the two groups.

=== Final day ===
On September 26, Phil Fontaine declared that the Peace Village was to come down the next day even though the conflict between the Mohawks and the Canadian Government had not yet been resolved. The weather in Winnipeg in September is quite cold and spokesperson Bob Macdonald is quoted as saying that the goal was to “support Quebec Mohawks” and that had been accomplished. Elder Art Shofley was resistant to leave and said that being at the Peace Village was important because it shared a positive image to contrast the negative images that the media had been releasing of Mohawks. He described the Peace Village as a sacred place

== See also ==
- Mohawk People
- Direct Action
- Indigenous Rights
- Social Justice
