= Waneek Horn-Miller =

Canadian water polo player (born 1975)

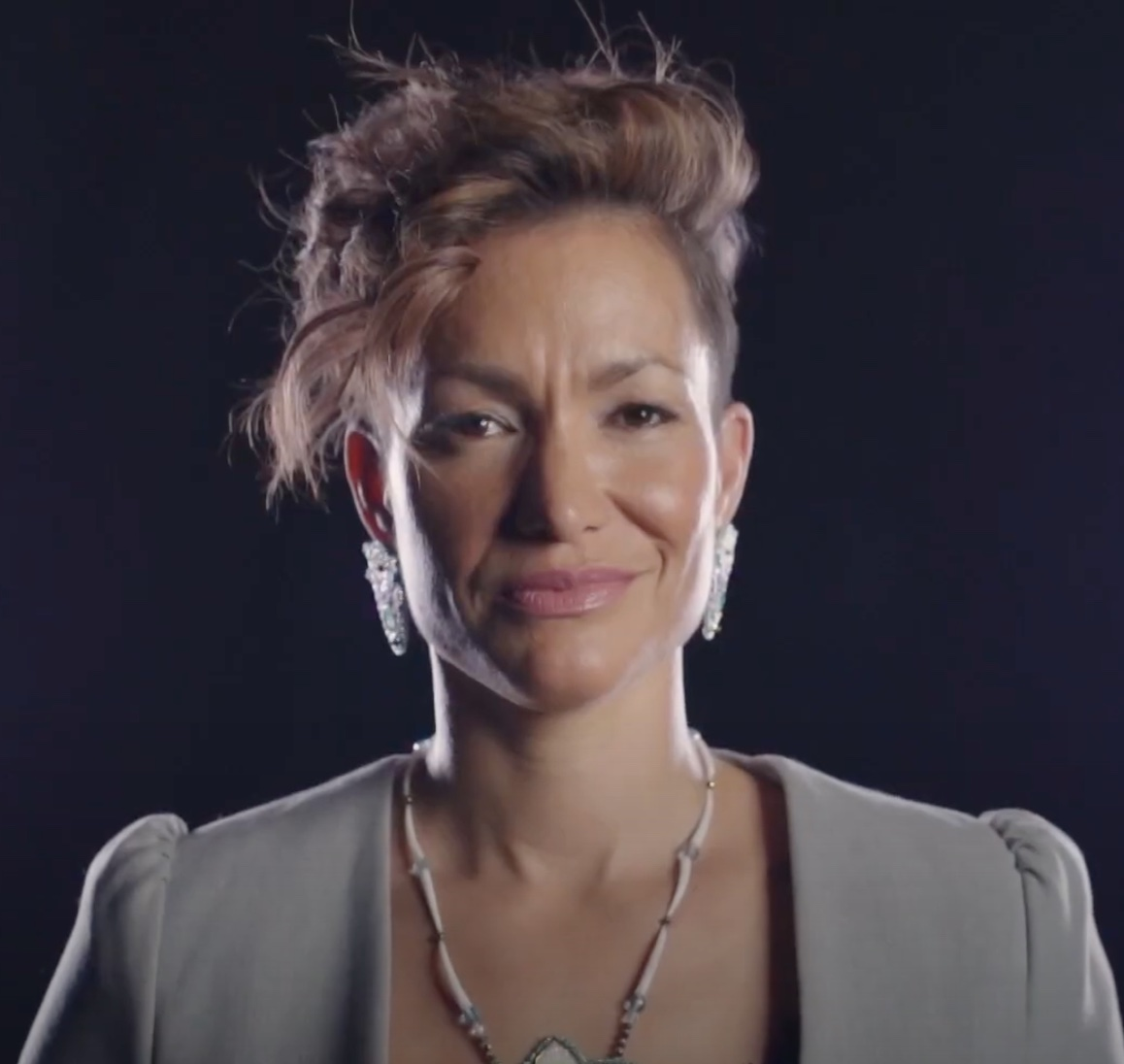
- Horn-Miller in 2021

Personal information
- Born: November 30, 1975 (age 50) Kahnawake, Quebec, Canada
- Spouse: Keith Morgan

Sport
- Sport: Water polo
Medal record
Women's water polo
Representing Canada
Pan American Games
| Gold medal – first place | 1999 Winnipeg | Team |
World Championships
| Bronze medal – third place | 2001 Fukuoka | Team |

Waneek Horn-Miller (born November 30, 1975) is a Canadian former water polo player from the Kahnawake Mohawk Territory. She was a member of the Canadian women's water polo team that won a gold medal at the 1999 Pan American Games in Winnipeg. Horn-Miller also became the first Mohawk woman from Canada to ever compete in the Olympic games. In 2019, she was awarded the Order of Sport, marking her induction into Canada's Sports Hall of Fame in the athlete category.

As a teenager, Horn-Miller became an iconic figure in First Nations issues in Canada when, at the end of the 78-day siege at the heart of the Oka Crisis, she was bayonetted by a Canadian soldier.

== Sporting career ==
Waneek Horn-Miller was a key member of the Canadian women's water polo team that won gold at the 1999 Pan Am Games. Voted MVP, Horn-Miller became co-captain and proudly led her team at the Sydney Olympics in 2000, the first year the Olympics included women’s water polo. The team finished fifth in Sydney. In 2000, she was awarded a National Aboriginal Achievement Award in the Youth category. She went on to help Canada win a bronze medal at the 2001 FINA World Championships. Horn-Miller was known for her fierce competitive spirit and powerful shooting arm. After 9 years as a member of national program Horn-Miller was dismissed by Water Polo Canada, with the organization citing team cohesion problems. Horn-Miller was outspoken about the dismissal, accusing the organization of racism. She challenged the claim and all parties, including national team coaches, athletes, and Horn-Miller, agreed to arbitration using the alternate dispute resolution system for sport. In 2004, Horn-Miller did not return to the team and her coaches and teammates were required to undergo cultural sensitivity training and Aboriginal sensitivity training. It was revealed that the members of her team thought that she was "intimidating" and they were not comfortable around her.

Horn-Miller began her athletic career as a competitive swimmer at the age of 7. She switched to water polo while attending Carleton University in Ottawa, where she studied political science. Horn-Miller graduated from Carleton as a three-time athlete of the year. She is a member of the Carleton Ravens Hall of Fame. Between 1990 and 1997, Horn-Miller has participated in the North American Indigenous Games and won over 20 gold medals, including one for rifle shooting.

In 1999, Horn-Miller won the national Tom Longboat Award that recognizes Aboriginal athletes for their outstanding contributions to sport in Canada. In 2006, Horn-Miller was selected as a torchbearer for the Winter Olympics in Turin, Italy.

== Professional career ==
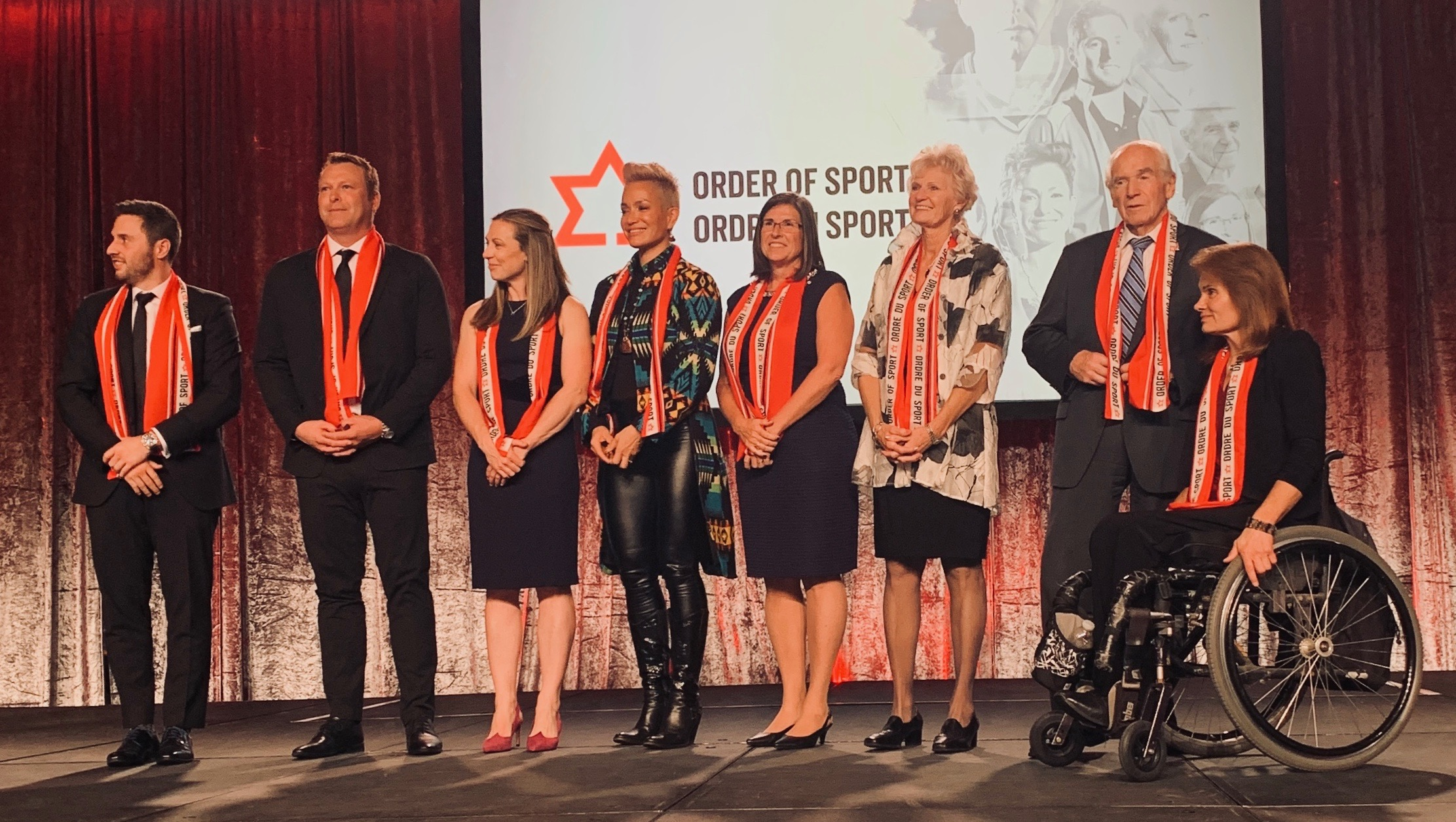
Inaugural Order of Sport Honours, Toronto, 2019

In 2008, Horn-Miller served as a broadcaster for CBC Sports at the 2008 Summer Olympics, held in Beijing.

In October 2011, Horn-Miller teamed up with the Aboriginal Peoples' Television Network to launch a fitness and healthy-eating initiative called Working It Out Together, which follows six Mohawks on their pursuit of better health.

Horn-Miller has also served as a motivational speaker. In 2014, she spoke to 18,000 youth from more than 1,000 schools across North America at WE Day in Toronto, with a message about overcoming obstacles and promoting positive social change in Indigenous communities in Canada. She fights against racism since she had received unfair treatment as an indigenous athlete. She is trying to help other young indigenous athletes to work hard for what they want to achieve despite the racism they may face.

As an influential speaker for the younger generation of Mohawks, she tries to motivate and be the role model for the kids to be hard-working and determined to achieve all their goals, just as she did as an indigenous athlete. Horn-Miller was herself inspired by Mohawk Olympian Alwyn Morris. Following his advice, she worked to share her achievements in hopes of inspiring others to reach for their dreams.

In November 2014, Horn-Miller was selected as an assistant chef de mission for the Canadian contingent that competed at the 2015 Pan American Games. In addition to serving as a mentor for the athletes, this volunteer position was responsible for promoting the Pan Am Games at various events and also communicating with various sporting bodies to ensure their athletes needs are being met.

In 2015 Horn-Miller was named one of Canada's most influential women in sport by the Canadian Association for Advancement of Women and Sport.

Horn-Miller also served as an ambassador for Nike's Native American initiative, Nike N7. She is currently a brand ambassador for Manitobah Mukluks and director of their Storyboot School. She was awarded the Order of Sport in 2019, marking her induction into Canada's Sports Hall of Fame.

In 2024 Horn-Miller was selected as a host on CBC's Primetime Panel during the 2024 Summer Olympics in Paris.

== Personal life ==
Born in Montreal, Quebec, Horn-Miller is the daughter of former model and First Nations activist Kahentinetha (Kahn-Tineta Horn) and George Miller (Mohawk educator and academic), and the half-sister of actress Kaniehtiio Horn.

She was present at the Oka Crisis as a 14-year-old; Horn-Miller spent weeks in the occupiers' encampment while her mother served as a negotiator. "My mother, Kahentinetha Horn is a native activist, old-school from the '60s. She was there and me and my little sister ended up following her there," Horn-Miller told a Canadian interviewer on the 25th anniversary of the incident.

After 78 days of the standoff, most of the protesters dismantled their barricades; the last occupied site was the Kanesatake treatment center, a tribal center for treating drug and alcohol addiction that had been built three years earlier. The women leaders in the center decided to end their protest. As some fifty adults and children marched out together, an altercation erupted between Mohawk warriors and soldiers. Horn-Miller, who was leading her four-year-old sister Kaniehtiio to safety, found herself face-to-face with a soldier who had, weeks earlier, refused to allow her to bring her schoolbooks into the encampment. "I pointed at him and said 'I know you…' " she recalled. "As I pointed at him I pulled my little sister behind my back and right at that point I got hit in the chest... and I fell forward and then someone kicked my feet out from underneath me and I landed on my back and my little sister fell on top of me." The soldier had stabbed her in the chest with a bayonet. She and the other protesters were held in custody for another 22 hours before she was given full medical attention. She recalled that a doctor treating her told her that had the bayonet "been a centimetre either way it would have gone right into your heart and you would have died."

During her 2000 Olympic campaign Horn-Miller appeared nude, except for a water polo ball and a feather, on the cover of Time magazine.

In 2014, Horn-Miller was one of seven people suing the Kahnawake Mohawk Council over the "marry out, stay out" policy, which prevents Mohawks who marry non-Mohawks from staying in the territory.

In February 2017, Horn-Miller was announced as the director of community engagement for the National Inquiry into Missing and Murdered Indigenous Women and Girls. Horn-Miller stepped down from the inquiry in August. There was controversy surrounding the operations and a coalition of family members, activists and academics sent a letter to Prime Minister Justin Trudeau demanding the "deeply misguided" inquiry get a hard reset.

== See also ==
- Canada women's Olympic water polo team records and statistics
- List of World Aquatics Championships medalists in water polo
