= Oka Crisis =

1990 land dispute between a group of Mohawk people and the town of Oka, Quebec, Canada

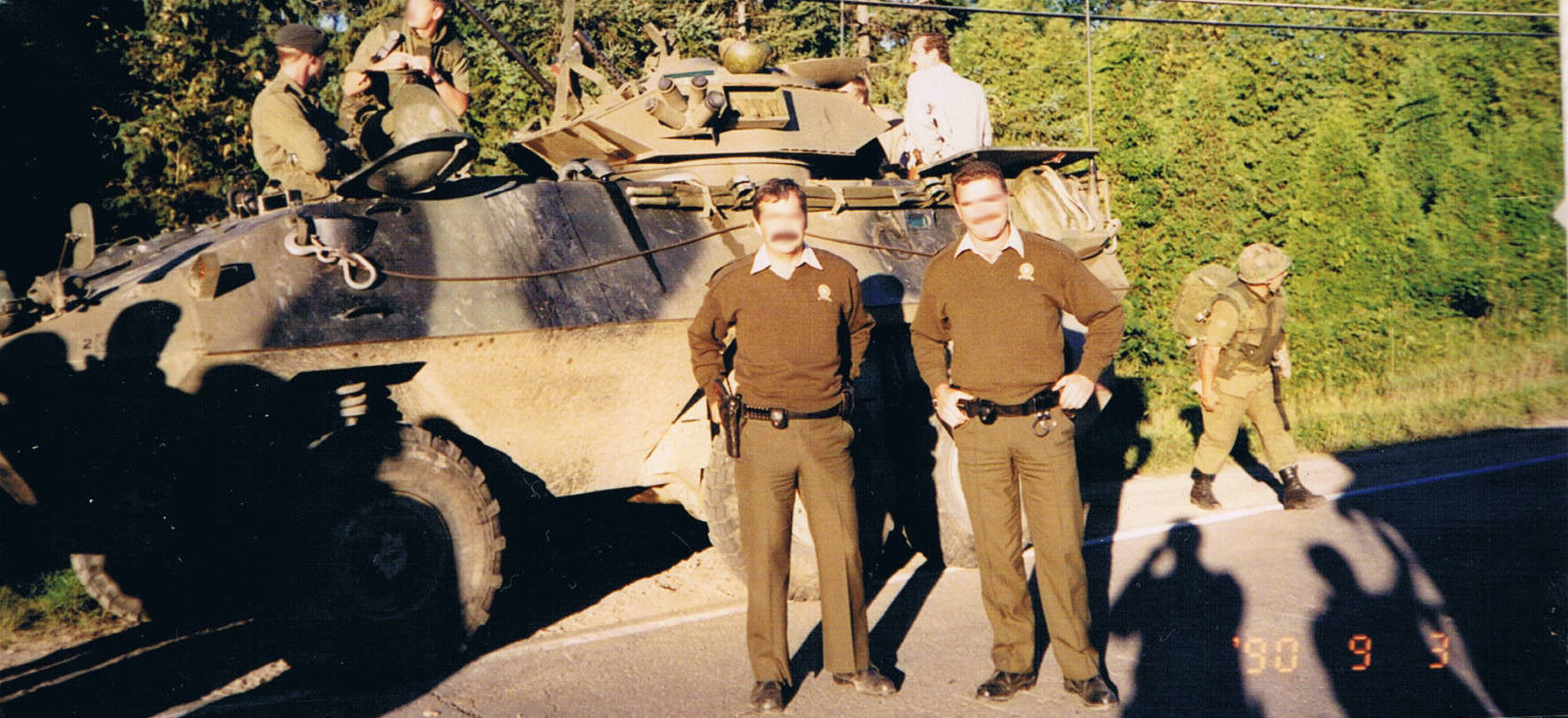
- Canadian soldiers and Sûreté du Québec officers on 3 September 1990
Date	July 11 – September 26, 1990 (2 months, 2 weeks and 1 day)
Location	Oka, Kanehsatà:ke and Kahnawá:ke, Quebec, Canada 45.46512°N 74.10317°W
Result	See aftermath: End of Mohawk blockade; Federal government purchased the Pines from Municipality of Oka to prevent further development.

Belligerents
Canada: Quebec	Mohawk

Commanders and leaders
John de Chastelain	Ellen Gabriel

Units involved
Canadian Armed Forces: Royal 22^{e} Régiment; Royal Canadian Mounted Police; Sûreté du Québec	Warrior Society: Local and non-local sympathizers

Strength
Force Mobile Command: 4,500 soldiers; more than 1,000 vehicles; RCMP: Small number positioned at various barricades and patrols; Sûreté du Québec: 10–100 Special operatives; 2,000 regular police; Dozens of vehicles	Non-local activists: more than 2,500 activists/warriors; Local activists: 75–600 armed warriors (at various times; including non-locals); Dozens of unarmed local activists

Casualties and losses
1 killed; 30 wounded	1 killed; 75 wounded

The Oka Crisis (French: Crise d'Oka), also known as the Mohawk Crisis or Kanehsatà:ke Resistance (French: Résistance de Kanehsatà:ke), was a land dispute between a group of Mohawk people and the town of Oka, Quebec, Canada, over plans to build a golf course on land known as "The Pines" which included an Indigenous burial ground. The crisis began on July 11, 1990, and lasted 78 days until September 26, with two fatalities. The dispute was the first well-publicized violent conflict between First Nations and provincial governments in the late 20th century.

== Historical background ==
=== Early settlement ===
Haudenosaunee (Iroquois) people, mainly members of the Mohawk nation (Kanien’kehá:ka), first established their homeland in the Hudson River valley before moving north to the lower area of the St. Lawrence River. The several hundred people who migrated at the time went on to develop three distinct Kanien’kehá:ka communities in the region: Kahnawá:ke, Kanehsatà:ke and Ahkwesáhsne.

Around 1658, the Kanien’kehá:ka had displaced the Wyandot people, with whom the Haudenosaunee had long been in conflict. In the fall of 1666, hundreds of French soldiers, as well as Algonquin and Huron allies, attacked southward from Lake Champlain and devastated four Kanien’kehá:ka villages near Albany, then negotiated a peace between the Haudenosaunee and the French and their allies which lasted for the next 20 years. In 1673, the Jesuit mission at Saint-François-Xavier brought about forty Kanien’kehá:ka from the village of Kaghnuwage, on the Mohawk River, in present-day New York state. In 1680, the Jesuits were granted the seigneurie Sault-Saint-Louis, now named the village of Kahnawá:ke, with a current area of over 4000 hectares. Starting in the 1680s, there was a military conflict between the English allied to the Kanien’kehá:ka and the French allied with other indigenous tribes. In the early 1690s, the Kanien’kehá:ka were weakened through a prolonged and severe military effort by the French.

In 1676, the Society of the Priests of Saint Sulpice (Sulpician Fathers), a Roman Catholic order, then based in Paris, France, founded Montreal Island's first mission at the foot of Mount Royal to minister to the Haudenosaunee / Kanien’kehá:ka, Algonquin and Huron neophytes and to distance them from French settlers in Ville Marie. In 1696, the Sulpicians moved the mission to one on the edge of the Rivière des Prairies, near the Sault-au-Récollet rapids, in north end Montreal Island. In 1717, the Compagnie de Saint-Sulpice de Paris was granted a concession (3.5 lieues of frontage, 3 lieues deep) named seigneurie du Lac-des-Deux-Montagnes.

In 1721, the Sulpicians moved the Sault-au-Récollet mission to two villages on seigneurie du Lac-des-Deux-Montagnes territory with the Algonquins and Nipissings being assigned the village to the east and the Kanien’kehá:ka being assigned the village to the west including territory known since the late 1880s as "The Pines" (formerly "sand dunes behind the village ... part of the Common Lands on which the Kanien’kehá:ka pastured their cattle") and the adjacent indigenous cemetery. This meant the Indigenous inhabitants were forced to move once again. To cushion the blow, they were promised ownership of the land they would inhabit. The seigneurie du Lac-des-Deux-Montagnes was expanded through two grants, one in 1733, consisting of small pie-shaped segment with 2 lieues of frontage to the east of initial concession land, and, in 1735, a larger segment representing about 40% of the seigneurie's total area. In all three grants the land was provided under the guarantee it would be used for the benefit of Indigenous residents.

=== Land dispute ===
Following the conquest of New France in 1760, the Act of Capitulation of Montreal guaranteed that all the "Indians" who had been allied to the French would be free to remain on the land they inhabited unless those lands were formally ceded to the Crown. This was restated by the Treaty of Paris and again in the Royal Proclamation of 1763. Hence, the Kanien’kehá:ka began advocating for the recognition of their land rights to British officials. Similar claims in Kahnawá:ke and Ahkwesáhsne were recognized, but the Kanehsatà:ke requests to be released from the rule of the Sulpicians and reporting of seminary officials to white settlers were ignored. When the Sulpicians aided the British in crushing the Patriot's War of 1837–38, the seminary's land title was confirmed. The Kanien’kehá:ka continued pursuing their right to the land, petitioning, and failing, to obtain the recognition of Lord Elgin's recognition of their claims in 1851. Eight years later, the Province of Canada extended the official title of the disputed land to the Sulpicians.

In 1868, one year after Confederation, the chief of the Oka Kanien’kehá:ka people, Joseph Onasakenrat, wrote a letter to the seminary claiming that its grant had included about 23 km^{2} (9 mi^{2}) reserved for Kanien’kehá:ka use in trust of the seminary, and that the seminary had neglected this trust by granting themselves (the seminary) sole ownership rights. In 1869, Onasakenrat attacked the seminary with a small armed force after having given the missionaries eight days to hand over the land. Local authorities ended this stand-off with force. In 1936, the seminary sold the territory under protest by the local Kanien’kehá:ka community. At the time they still kept cattle on the common land. By 1956, the Kanien’kehá:ka were left to six remaining square kilometres out of their original 165.

In 1959, the town approved the development of a private nine-hole golf course, the Club de golf d'Oka, on a portion of the disputed land. The project area bordered The Pines, as well as a Kanien’kehá:ka burial ground in use, at that time, for nearly a century. The Kanien’kehá:ka suit filed against the development did not succeed. Construction also began on a parking lot and golf greens adjacent to the Kanien’kehá:ka cemetery.

In 1977, the Kanehsatà:ke band filed an official land claim with the federal Office of Native Claims regarding the land. The claim was accepted for filing and funds were provided for additional research of the claim. In 1986 the claim was rejected on the basis that it failed to meet key legal criteria.

In March 1989, the Club de golf d'Oka announced plans to expand the golf course by an additional nine holes. As the Office of Native Claims had rejected the Kanien’kehá:ka claim on the land three years earlier, his office did not consult the Kanien’kehá:ka on the plans. No environmental or historic preservation review was undertaken. Protests by Kanien’kehá:ka and others, as well as concern from the Quebec Minister of the Environment, led to negotiations and a postponement of the project by the municipality in August pending a court ruling on the development's legality.

=== Lead-up to the crisis ===
On June 30, 1990, the court found in favour of the developers, and the mayor of Oka, Jean Ouellette, announced that the remainder of the Pines would be cleared to expand the golf course to eighteen holes and to construct 60 condominiums. Not all residents of Oka approved of the plans, but opponents found the mayor's office unwilling to discuss them.

On March 11, as a protest against the court decision to allow the golf course expansion to proceed, some members of the Kanien’kehá:ka community erected a barricade blocking access to the dirt side-road between Route 344 and "The Pines". Protesters ignored a court injunction in late April ordering the dismantling of the barricade, as well as a second order issued on June 29. Mayor Ouellette demanded compliance with the court order, but the land defenders refused.

On July 5, the Quebec minister of Public Security, Sam Elkas, said, regarding the land defenders at the Pines, that "they have until the 9th [of July], after that date it's going down." The next day, the Quebec Human Rights Commission alerted John Ciaccia and Tom Siddon, respectively the provincial and federal native affairs ministers, of the rapidly increasing threat of conflict near Oka and the need to establish an independent committee to review the historical Kanien’kehá:ka land claim. Ciaccia wrote a letter of support for the Kanien’kehá:ka, saying that "these people have seen their lands disappear without having been consulted or compensated, and that, in my opinion, is unfair and unjust, especially over a golf course." This did not sway the mayor.

== Crisis ==
=== Police raid ===
On July 11, at 5:15 a.m., police officers arrived to the Kanien’kehá:ka barricade that was blocking the Pines' southern gate. Police cars, vans, and rented trucks were parked in front of the roadblock. Police personnel took up tactical positions in the trees or crouched in ditches. Others proceeded to the barricade. At the same time, another police unit known as "Sector Five" approached the northern roadblock. A total of around a hundred officers surrounded the Kanien’kehá:ka warriors and their allies, including a tactical intervention squad and riot police.

The previous day the mayor of Oka, Jean Ouellette, had asked the Sûreté du Québec (SQ) to intervene with the Kanien’kehá:ka protest, citing alleged criminal activity at the barricade. While the protesters had expected town officials or municipal workers, they had been promised by an SQ officer that the police would not intervene in this civil injunction. While they were reportedly willing to be arrested in the defence of their land, they had hoped to avoid violence.

The Kanien’kehá:ka women present at the southern barricade purportedly took charge of the interactions with authorities as they recognized the protection of the land as their own duty. A dozen of them, arms stretched out to signify their being unarmed and having no violent intent, walked towards the police. Authorities said they would speak only to a designated leader, while the group of women said that they were all representing the interests of the group and no single leader existed. Tensions escalated as the authorities would not discuss matters with the Kanien’kehá:ka women. Eventually, the group compromised and asked a male protester to come forward and talk with the officers; which was in vain. The SQ deployed their Emergency Response Team (ERT), a police tactical unit, threw tear gas canisters and concussion grenades at the protesters in an attempt to force them to disperse.

The Kahnawá:ke Warrior Society was called in for reinforcements, and by 6:20 a.m. they were seizing Honoré-Mercier Bridge and the highways which fed into it. They gained control of the two lanes of Highway 138, and then pushed back the thousands of cars to Châteauguay. Over the next three hours they created a no-man's land between two barricades while other contingents blocked Highways 132 and 207 as well as Old Châteauguay Road.

Around 7:30 a.m. a front-end loader (sometimes cited as a bulldozer) and helicopter arrived, and the police moved closer to the barricade. Trees were sawed down by the Kanien’kehá:ka and added to the barricade while additional police cars arrived. Members of the surrounding Kanien’kehá:ka communities joined those already present at the Pines as tear gas canisters were thrown at the southern barrier. Around 8:30 the front-end loader rammed the barricade. Then armed police officers moved into the Pines, and gunshots were fired from both sides. Then the police retreated, abandoning six cruisers and the front-end loader. Although an initial account reported that 31-year-old SQ Corporal Marcel Lemay had been shot in the face during the firefight, a later inquest determined that the bullet which killed him struck his "left side below the armpit, an area not covered by [his] bullet-proof vest". Despite a 1985 SQ directive mandating that all officer communications be recorded, no record of the events was provided to the court, which the coroner decried as "unacceptable" and "even comical".

=== Siege ===
Upon their return, SQ officers established a perimeter around the protesters both at Kahnawáːke and Kanehsatà:ke, blocking all access routes with rows of police cars and sandbags, preventing supplies like food and medication to be delivered and blocking ambulances from intervening. Representatives from the Quebec Human Rights Commission were also prevented from entering. In turn, protesters fortified their barricades and erected new ones, but police forced their way in to arrest, search and interrogate. On July 12, at the request of the Quebec minister of Public Security, the Canadian Armed Forces began sending plain clothes military officers, C7 rifles, night-vision equipment, bulletproof vests and armoured vehicles.

Before the raid, there were approximately 30 armed Kanien’kehá:ka in and around the barricade; following the gun battle, this number grew to 60–70 and later grew to 600. The Kanien’kehá:ka seized six vehicles, including four police cars, and commandeered the front-end loader to crush the vehicles and use them to form a new barricade across Route 344.

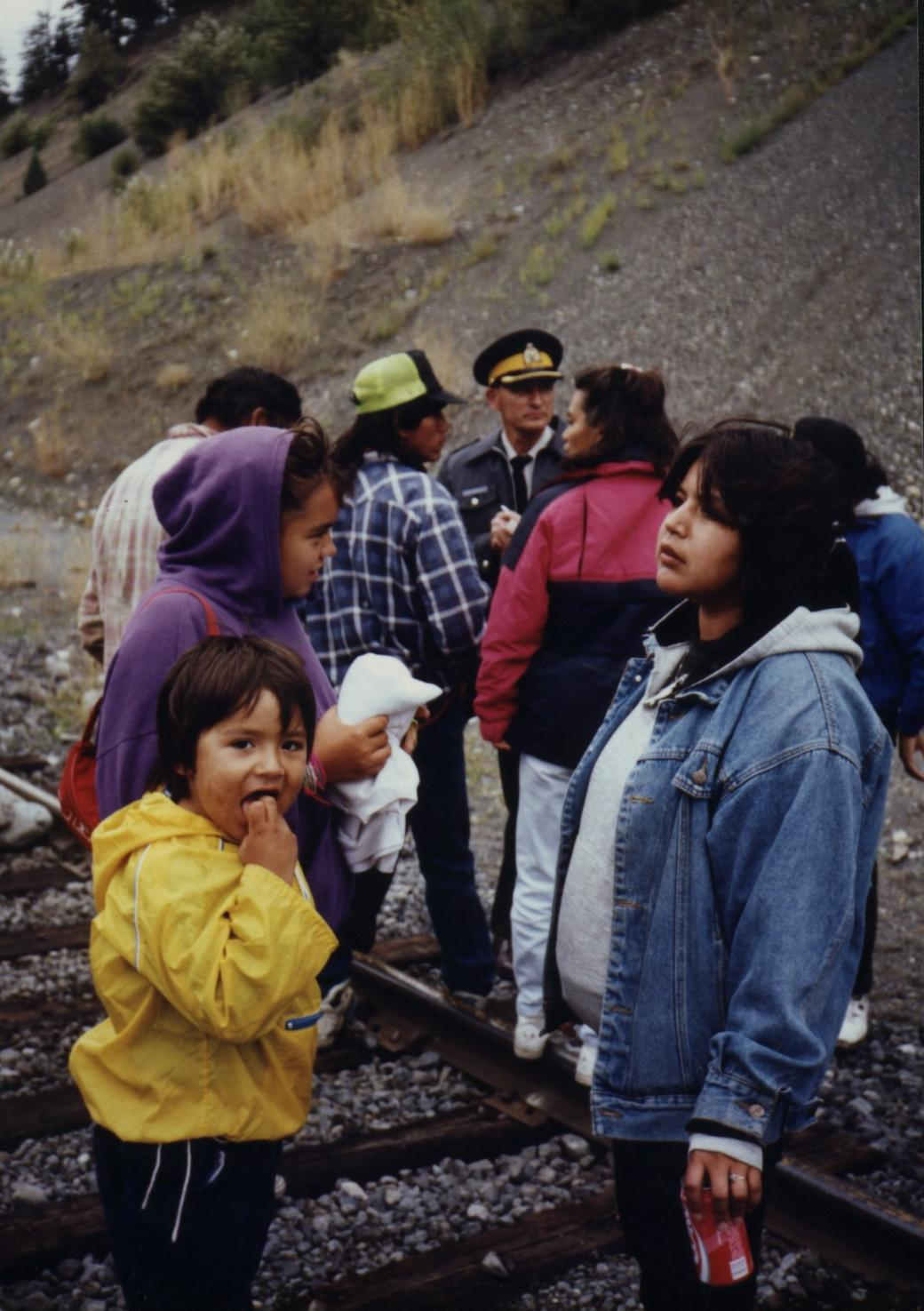
Members of the Seton Lake Indian Band blockade the BC Rail line in support of Oka, while an RCMP officer looks on. Later in the day, several elders protesting were arrested, and a confrontation with the band community ensued as Mounties drove the cars holding those arrested through the reserve en route to Lillooet.

The Kanien’kehá:ka established a network for communications among the Kanien’kehá:ka villages/reserves of Ahkwesáhsne, Kanehsatà:ke and Kahnawáːke, using hand-held radios, cellular phones, air raid sirens and fire hall bells, as well as local radio stations, and patrols. The local Kanien’kehá:ka were joined by Indigenous people from across Canada and the United States. People from Mi'kmaq communities, as well as a Buddhist monk and Filipina acupuncturist, joined the protesters in the early weeks of the fight. Fifteen activist-students were sent from all over Canada by the Canadian Federation of Students to write a policy paper, but most of the students decided to stay on in aid to the Kanien’kehá:ka cause instead. Additionally, over a hundred Oneida people from New York, Wisconsin, and southern Ontario, as well as a Quebec Algonquin man, and several women from western Canada and Mexico all came to help. The Kanien’kehá:ka Warriors and protesters also received support from Indigenous populations across the country. As well, support elsewhere was shown by the establishment of a Peace Village in Winnipeg.

The Mercier Bridge was blockaded at the point where it passed through Kanien’kehá:ka territory, thereby sealing off a major access between the Island of Montreal and Montreal's densely populated South Shore suburbs. This frustrated commuters, which resulted in violent confrontations. At the peak of the crisis, the Mercier Bridge and routes 132, 138, and 207 were all blocked, creating substantial disruption to traffic.

Corporal Marcel Lemay's funeral was held on July 16, and was attended by around 2000 people, including police officers from across Canada and the SQ director. The Warrior flag was lowered to half-mast in the Pines. On July 17, the Red Cross was granted entrance by police to provide food relief, but this access was rescinded quickly, forcing residents to smuggle provisions in. The Kanien’kehá:ka coalition, speaking on behalf of the resistance, agreed on preconditions for negotiations: free access to food and advisors and the presence of independent international observers, which both the provincial and federal governments firmly opposed.

Anger grew among residents as the crisis dragged on. A group of Châteauguay residents started building an unauthorized, unplanned roadway circumventing the Kahnawáːke reserve. Long after the crisis, this unfinished roadway was eventually incorporated into Quebec Autoroute 30. Residents of Châteauguay assaulted a Kanien’kehá:ka woman trying to buy groceries and tried to prevent her from leaving the store, from which she had to be escorted by police, and threw tomatoes at her and her children. They also burned multiple effigies of Kanien’kehá:ka warriors while chanting "sauvages" (savages).

By August 12, the crowd at Mercier Bridge had become a riot several thousand strong, destroying police vehicles and wounding officers. The SQ lost control of the situation, and the Royal Canadian Mounted Police (RCMP) were deployed. This resulted in 35 people, including ten constables, being hospitalized for their injuries. The heated context of the "failed" Meech Lake Accord earlier that summer, as well as the tensions between French and English speakers in the province complicated public sentiment vis-a-vis the Kanehsatà:ke resistance. Radio host Gilles Proulx raised tensions with comments such as the Kanien’kehá:ka "couldn't even speak French", while Simon Bédard of CJPR called for "cleaning everything up" by killing "fifty, one hundred, one hundred and twenty-five" people, burying them and forgetting about it. These remarks inflamed tempers that had been running especially high from comments preceding this crisis, including those by Ricardo Lopez, the federal Member of Parliament for Châteauguay, who denigrated the Kanien’kehá:ka.

=== Intervention by the armed forces ===
Nightly gatherings at the blockaded Mercier Bridge grew in size and violence, adding to the pressure put on SQ forces, leading the Quebec premier Robert Bourassa to announce that in accord with Section 275 of the National Defence Act, he was requisitioning military support from the Canadian Armed Forces on August 27. The same day Prime Minister Brian Mulroney appointed Quebec Chief Justice Alan B. Gold as special mediator to negotiate an agreement with the land defenders. On August 28, press conferences were held by military leadership to announce the upcoming intervention and by Mulroney to denounce the actions of the protesters. Lieutenant-General Kent Foster announced the upcoming use of three Leopard tanks and that Brigadier-General Armand Roy was given full autonomy to attack at will with the objective of obtaining "unconditional surrender" from the Warriors.

In response, families with children and elderly members attempted to flee Kahnawáːke, and were met at the barricades by a crowd throwing stones. Though the SQ had guaranteed safety for the evacuees, they did not attempt to stop the crowd from breaking windshields and windows. Several people were wounded. The car in which Kanien’kehá:ka elder Joe Armstrong, 71, was riding was hit with a projectile that shattered the windshield; the next day, Armstrong suffered a fatal heart attack that doctors attributed to stress. The following morning, Canadian Armed Forces replaced SQ officers surrounding Kahnawáːke and Kanehsatà:ke.

General John de Chastelain, Chief of the Defence Staff, placed Quebec-based troops in support of the provincial authorities; 2,500 regular and reserve troops were put on notice. On August 20, a company of the Royal 22^{e} Régiment, known colloquially in English as the "Van Doos", led by Major Alain Tremblay, took over three barricades and arrived at the final blockade leading to the disputed area. There, they reduced the stretch of no man's land, originally implemented by the SQ before the barricade at the Pines, from 1.5 kilometres to 5 metres. Additional troops and mechanized equipment mobilized at staging areas around Montreal, while reconnaissance aircraft flew air photo missions over Kanien’kehá:ka territory to gather intelligence. On August 29, the Kanien’kehá:ka at the Mercier Bridge negotiated an end to their protest blockade with Lieutenant-Colonel Robin Gagnon, the "Van Doos" commander who had been responsible for the south shore of the St. Lawrence River during the crisis.

While the Warriors at Kahnawáːke had reached an agreement with government officials and had begun dismantling their barricades, Kanehsatà:ke was now more vulnerable and isolated. Though the land dispute which had led to the crisis was resolved in principle, since the federal government had secured the purchase of the land from the developers and the town of Oka, it had yet to transfer the land title into Kanien’kehá:ka hands. Furthermore, the protesters at Kanehsatà:ke were still waiting on safety guarantees for themselves and their allies before risking giving up their last bargaining chips. Nonetheless, Bourassa announced that negotiations were over and demanded that international observers leave. They reluctantly submitted to his request, and were replaced by local church and human rights observers. Multiple parallel and sometimes secret talks were held, unbeknownst to many of the parties involved. With the bridge no longer occupied and Kahnawáːke essentially neutralized, the armed forces entered Kanehsatà:ke on September 1. They dismantled the last barricade on Highway 344 on September 2. The next day, only 24 Warriors were left defending a territory of only a few hundred meters and were surrounded by ravines, the lake, over 400 soldiers with machine guns, armoured vehicles and helicopters. They were sheltered in a treatment centre, at the top of a hill, with dormitories, a kitchen, food reserves, and communication equipment. What followed was the last leg of a prolonged siege.

By September 6, the Mercier Bridge was functional again. Journalists were forbidden from approaching the Warrior stronghold and the armed forces cut all cellphone service to the treatment centre. Anyone who left the compound was arrested, including legal counsel Stanley Cohen.

== Resolution and aftermath ==
September 25, 1990 witnessed the final engagement of the crisis: a Kanien’kehá:ka warrior walked around the perimeter of the blockade area with a long stick, setting off flares that had been originally installed by the Canadian Forces to alert them to individuals fleeing the area. The soldiers turned a water hose on this man, but it lacked enough pressure to disperse the crowd surrounding him. This crowd taunted the soldiers and began throwing water balloons at them, but the incident did not escalate further.

Finally, after 78 days of fighting and 26 days of siege without supplies being let through, the land defenders decided to end the struggle. The remaining protesters began walking home, but all were arrested either while leaving Kanehsatà:ke or while entering Oka. As the military began arresting land defenders and some began to flee, 14-year-old Waneek Horn-Miller, who was carrying her 4-year-old half sister Kaniehtiio Horn, was stabbed near the heart by a Canadian soldier with a bayonet, and nearly died.

The journalists who had stayed with the Kanien’kehá:ka people in the treatment centre were now held and interrogated. The Kanehsatà:ke Resistance was over.

Among those charged and convicted for their participation was Ronaldo Casalpro (who used the alias Ronald "Lasagna" Cross during the conflict). Casalpro was beaten by Sûreté du Québec officers after his arrest, and while three were suspended without pay, the case took so long to process that they had already left the force. Two SQ officers were suspended and investigated for allegedly beating Casalpro while in captivity, but were not subsequently charged. Cross served a six-year sentence for assault and weapons charges related to his role in the crisis and died of a heart attack in November 1999. Casalpro's brother, Tracy Cross, later served as the best man at the wedding of slain SQ Corporal Lemay's sister, Francine, who had reconciled with the community after reading At the Woods' Edge, a history of Kanehsatà:ke.

The golf course expansion that had originally triggered the crisis was cancelled and the land under dispute was purchased from the developers by the Government of Canada for CA$5.3 million. The municipality initially refused to sell the land until Kanien’kehá:ka barricades were dismantled, but acquiesced when the government threatened to expropriate the land without compensation. The Government of Canada did not transfer this land to Kanehsatà:ke ownership nor establish it as a land reserve.

The Oka Crisis motivated the development of a national Aboriginal Police Force in Canada First Nations Policing Policy, to try to prevent future incidents, and brought Indigenous issues into the forefront in Canada. In 1991, Ouellette was re-elected mayor of Oka by acclamation. He later said of the crisis that his responsibilities as mayor required him to act as he did.

== In media ==
The Oka Crisis was extensively documented and inspired numerous books and films.

Canadian filmmaker Alanis Obomsawin made documentaries about the Oka Crisis, including Kanehsatake: 270 Years of Resistance (1993) and Rocks at Whiskey Trench (2000). These and two additional documentaries on the crisis were all produced by the National Film Board of Canada: Christine Welsh directed Keepers of the Fire (1994), which documents the role of Kanien’kehá:ka women during the crisis, and Alec MacLeod created Acts of Defiance (1993).

Montreal Gazette journalist Albert Nerenberg switched careers after smuggling a video camera behind the barricades and making his first documentary, called Okanada.

Taiaiake Alfred, a Kahnawá:ke Kanien’kehá:ka who was part of the band council during the crisis, and who later became a professor of political science, wrote Heeding the Voices of Our Ancestors: Kahnawake Mohawk Politics and the Rise of Native Nationalism (1995). This is based on his PhD dissertation of the same name, which examines the issues.

Robin Philpot wrote a book about Canadian English language media's use of the crisis as a political tool following the failed Meech Lake Accord: Oka : dernier alibi du Canada anglais.

The 2020 film Beans, which won the Canadian Screen Award for Best Motion Picture, portrays the incident through the eyes of a young Kanien’kehá:ka girl. Tracey Deer, who lived through the crisis when she was twelve years old, directed and co-wrote the film.

Indian Summer: The Oka Crisis, a TV mini-series, was made in 2006.

The Canadian punk band Propagandhi released a song about the Oka crisis which is titled "Oka Everywhere" and released in 1994 on their EP I’d Rather Be Flag Burning.

== In print ==
Ellen Gabriel (Katsi'tsakwas), a Kanien’kehá:ka artist and activist, authored the book When the Pine Needles Fall with historian Sean Carleton, documenting the events.

== In art ==
Joseph Tehawehron David, a Kanien’kehá:ka artist who became known for his role as a warrior during the Oka Crisis in 1990, developed a body of artistic work that was deeply influenced by his experience "behind the wire" in 1990.

== See also ==
- Face to Face (photograph) – Photo taken in 1990 during the Oka Crisis
- Timeline of Quebec history
- Gustafsen Lake standoff – 1995 indigenous conflict in British Columbia, Canada
- Ipperwash Crisis – First Nations land dispute in Ontario
- Grand River land dispute – Dispute over Indigenous land rights in Canada
- Seton Portage § Land claims issues
- Burnt Church Crisis – 1999–2002 dispute in Canada's Maritimes
- 2020 Canadian pipeline and railway protests – Protests in Canada
- Fairy Creek old-growth logging protests – Ongoing environmentalist and indigenous rights protests
- Mohawk Civil War – 1989–1990 conflict over reservation gambling
- List of incidents of civil unrest in Canada

== Notes & references ==
=== References ===
- Alfred, Gerald R. (1995). Heeding the Voices of Our Ancestors: Kahnawake Mohawk Politics and the Rise of Native Nationalism. Oxford University Press. ISBN 0-19-541138-2.
- Anon-AP (July 12, 1990a). "Officer Dies as Mohawks and Quebec Police Clash". The New York Times. Archived from the original on January 2, 2020.
- Baird, Craig (August 22, 2020a). "The Kanesatake Resistance". Canadian History Ehx.
- Barrett, Paul (2015). Blackening Canada: Diaspora, Race, Multiculturalism. Toronto: University of Toronto Press. p. 256. ISBN 978-1442647701.
- Béchard, Henri (1975). The Original Caughnawaga Indians. Montreal: Ateliers des Sourds, Inc. ISBN 0-919-366-369-9. OCLC 934030473.
- Bennett, Carolyn; Miller, Marc; Vandal, Daniel (July 11, 2020a). "30th Anniversary of the Oka Crisis" (Press release). Government of Canada.
- Boily, Maxime (2006). "Les terres amérindiennes dans le régime seigneurial : les modèles fonciers des missions sédentaires de la Nouvelle-France" (PDF) (M.A.). Université Laval.
- Bonvillain, Nancy (2005). The Mohawk. Chelsea House Publishers. ISBN 0-7910-8352-7.
- Campbell, Lindsey (March 2010a). "(Re)covering Oka: Alanis Obomsawin's Representation of the Crisis at Oka". Off Screen.
- Canada Govt, RRCAP (October 1996a). "Volume 1: Looking Forward, Looking Back". Report of the Royal Commission on Aboriginal Peoples (PDF). Royal Commission on Aboriginal Peoples.
- Deer, Jessica (July 11, 2020a). "Oka Crisis: The legacy of the warrior flag". CBC News.
- Gelderloos, Peter (March 1, 2015a). The Failure of Nonviolence. Left Bank Books. ISBN 978-0939306046.
- Ha, Tu Thanh (July 11, 2000a). "Crisis inspired many native people". The Globe and Mail.
- Hamilton, Graeme (September 13, 2008a), "Dion ranks a distant second in Quebec Liberal leader haunted by Clarity Act", National Post
- Katlatont Gabriel-Doxtater, Brenda; Kawanatatie Van den Hende, Arlette (1995). At the Woods' Edge: An Anthology of the History of the People of Kanehsatà:ke. Kanehsatake Education Centre.
- Lackenbauer, P. Whitney (Winter 2008a). "Carrying the Burden of Peace: the Mohawks, the Canadian Forces, and the Oka Crisis". Journal of Military and Strategic Studies. 10 (2). Archived from the original on December 26, 2017.
- Ladner, Kiera L.; Simpson, Leanne, eds. (2010), This is an Honour Song: Twenty Years Since the Blockades, Chico: AK Press, ISBN 9781894037419
- MacLeod, Alec G. (1992). Acts of Defiance. National Film Board of Canada. IMDb
- Marshall, Tabitha (July 11, 2013a). "Oka Crisis". The Canadian Encyclopedia.
- LMDQ. "Mémoire du Québec, La".
- Miller, J.R. (2000). Skyscrapers hide the heavens : a history of Indian-white relations in Canada (3rd ed.). University of Toronto Press. ISBN 9781442689145.
- Montgomery, Mark (September 26, 2016a). "History: Oka Crisis Ends". Radio Canada International / RCI.
- Obomsawin, Alanis (1993). Kanehsatake: 270 Years of Resistance. National Film Board of Canada.
- Pertusati, Linda (1997). In Defense of Mohawk Land: Ethnopolitical Conflict in Native North America. Albany: State University of New York Press. ISBN 978-0791432129.
- Riopel, Alexis; Béland, Antoine (July 9, 2020a). "La crise d'Oka, jour par jour". Le Devoir.
- Rumrill, Donald A. (Spring 1985a). "An Interpretation and Analysis of the Seventeenth Century Mohawk Nation: Its Chronology and Movements". The Bulletin and Journal of Archaeology for New York State. 90: 1–39.
- St-Amand, Isabelle; Stewart, S.E. (2018). "3. The Disputed Land: Performing Sovereignty". Stories of Oka: land, film, and literature. University of Manitoba Press. ISBN 9780887555527.
- Scott, Marian (July 10, 2015a). "Oka Crisis: Sister of slain corporal builds bridges". Montreal Gazette.
- Scott, Marian (July 10, 2015b). "Revisiting the Pines: Oka's legacy". Montreal Gazette.
- Tekastiaks (1990). "Mohawk territory at Oka under dispute". Peace and Environment News. Archived from the original on February 7, 2009.
- Thompson, John (January 1991a). A Brief History of the Land Dispute at Kanesake [Oka] from Contact to 1961 (PDF). Library Indian and Northern Affairs.. Note: Prepared under contract for the Treaties and Historical Research Centre Comprehensive Claims Branch Department of Indian and Northern Affairs.
- York, Geoffrey; Pindera, Loreen (1991). People of the pines: The warriors and the legacy of Oka. Little, Brown. ISBN 0-316-96916-8.

== Further sources ==
A vast amount has been written in both English and French on the Oka crisis, including the following:

English works

- Taiaiake Alfred (1999). Peace, Power, Righteousness: An Indigenous Manifesto Don Mills: Oxford University Press
- Alan C. Cairns (2000). Citizens Plus: Aboriginal Peoples and the Canadian State, Vancouver: UBC Press;
- Canada, Parliament of; House of Commons (1991). Standing Committee on Aboriginal Affairs, The Summer of 1990: Fifth Report of the Standing Committee on Aboriginal Affairs, Ottawa;
- John Ciaccia (2000). Oka Crisis: A Mirror of the Soul, Dorval, QC: Maren Publications;
- Tom Flanagan (2000). First Nations? Second Thoughts, Montreal & Kingston: McGill-Queen's University Press;
- Donna Goodleaf (1995). Entering the War Zone: A Mohawk Perspective on Resisting Invasions, Penticton, BC: Theytus Books;
- Rick Hornung (1991). One Nation Under the Gun: Inside the Mohawk Civil War, Toronto: Stoddart;
- Craig Maclaine (1990). This Land is Our Land: the Mohawk Revolt at Oka, Montreal: Optimum Publishing;
- J.R. Miller (2004). Lethal Legacy: Current Native Controversies in Canada, Toronto: McCelland & Stewart Ltd.;
- Donald B. Smith (1982). "Onasakenrat, Joseph", in Dictionary of Canadian Biography, vol. 11, University of Toronto / Université Laval, 2003–, accessed November 16, 2021';

French works

- Gilles Boileau (1991). Oka, terre indienne, Histoire Québec, 5(2), 35–39;
- John Ciaccia (2000). Crise d'Oka : miroir de notre âme, Montréal: Leméac;
- Francois Dallaire (1991). Oka : la hache de guerre, Sainte-Foy, Québec: Éditions de la Liberté;
- Jacques-A. Lamarche (1990). L'Eté de Mohawks : bilan des 78 jours, Montréal: Stanké;
- Robin Philpot (1991). Oka : dernier alibi du Canada anglais, Montréal: VLB;
- Hélène Sévigny (1993). Lasagne : l'homme derrière le masque, Saint-Lambert, PQ: Éditions Sedes.

Documentary films

- Acts of Defiance (1992). Montreal: National Film Board of Canada;
- Rocks at Whiskey Trench (2000). Montreal: National Film Board of Canada
- My name is Kahentiiosta (1995). Montreal : National Film Board;
- Spudwrench: Kahnawake Man (c. 1997). Montreal : National Film Board of Canada;
- The Oka Legacy (c. 2016). CBC/Sonia Bonspille Boileau.
