= Jesuit missions in North America =

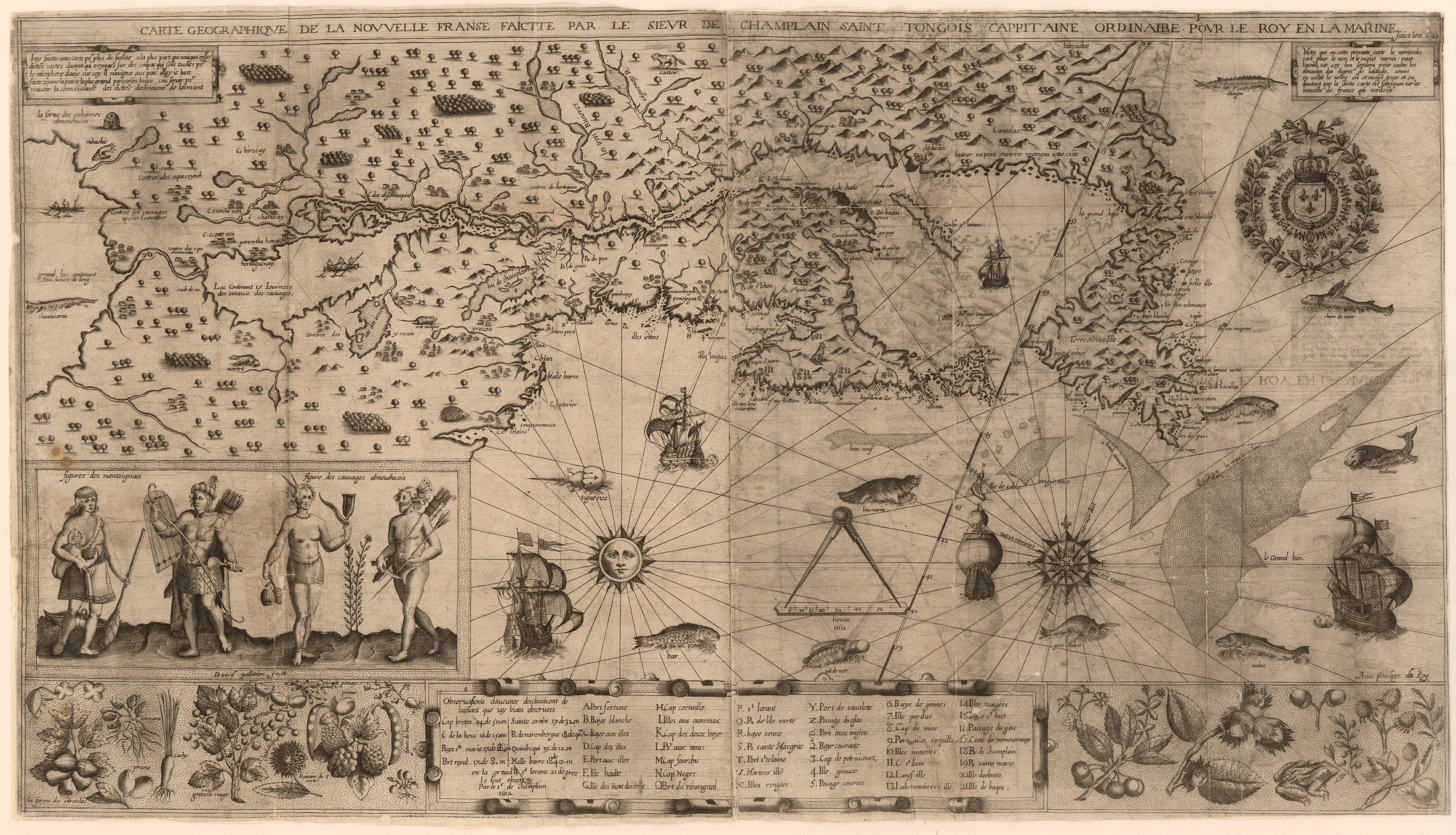
Map of New France (Champlain, 1612)

Jesuit missions in North America were attempted in the late 16th century, established early in the 17th century, faltered at the beginning of the 18th, disappeared during the suppression of the Society of Jesus around 1763, and returned around 1830 after the restoration of the Society. The missions were established as part of the colonial drive of France and Spain during the period, the "saving of souls" being an accompaniment of the constitution of Nouvelle-France and early colonial Mexico. The efforts of the Jesuits in North America were paralleled by their China missions on the other side of the world, and in South America. They left written documentation of their efforts, in the form of The Jesuit Relations.

== Establishment of Nouvelle-France and first missions ==
Toward the end of his reign, Henry IV of France started to look at the possibility of ventures abroad, with both North America and the Levant being among the possibilities.

In 1570, Spanish Jesuits moved northward from St. Augustine in Florida to establish a small mission in Virginia: the Ajacán Mission. On February 19, 1571, eight missionaries were killed by the local Indigenous. The Martyrs have become Servants of God.

In 1604, the French explorer Samuel de Champlain initiated the first important French involvement in Northern America. He founded Port Royal as the first permanent European settlement in North America north of Florida in 1605, and the first permanent French establishment at Quebec in 1608.

=== First Mission (1609) ===
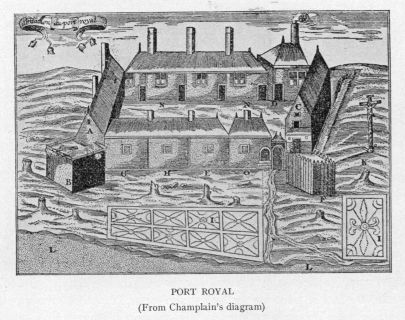
Habitation at Port Royal circa 1612.

The Jesuits established a mission on Penobscot Bay in 1609, which was part of the French colony of Acadia.

=== Second Mission (1611) ===
The Jesuits wanted to participate in these forays into new lands. On October 25, 1604, the Jesuit Father Pierre Coton requested his General Superior Claudio Acquaviva to send two missionaries to Terre-Neuve. As a result, in 1611 the two first Jesuits, Pierre Biard and Enemond Massé, were able to leave for Port Royal in Acadia. The mission failed in 1613 following a raid by Virginians.

=== Third Mission (1613) ===
A third mission was built on Mount Desert Island in 1613.

=== Fourth mission (1625) ===
The Jesuits conceived plans to move their efforts to the shore of the St. Lawrence River. A fourth mission was established in 1625 by Fathers Charles Lalemant as Superior, Enemond Massé, St. Jean de Brébeuf, and assistants François Charton and Gilbert Buret. This mission failed following the occupation of Quebec by English forces in 1629.

== The Jesuit establishment ==
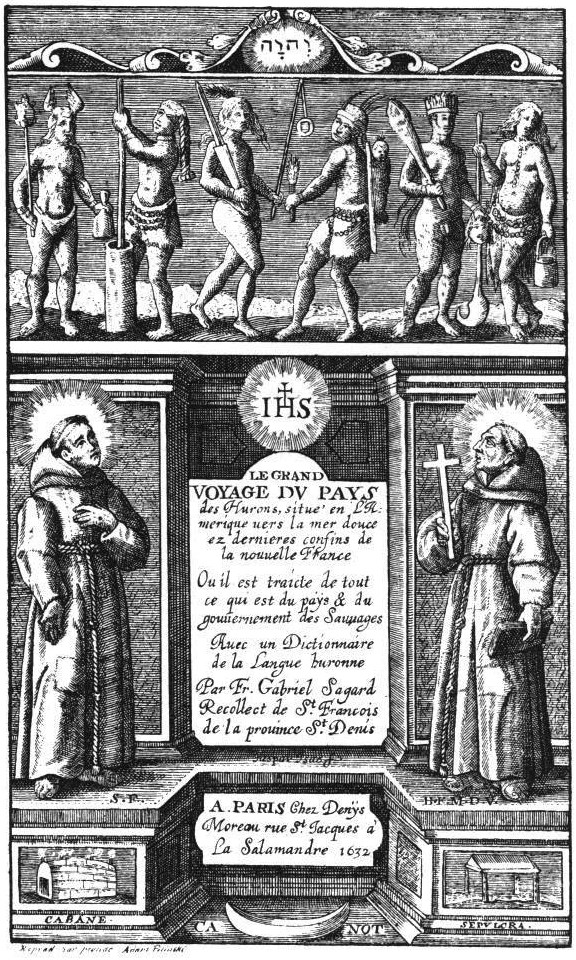
Le Grand Voyage du Pays des Hurons, Gabriel Sagard, 1632.

Although the Jesuits tried to establish missions from present-day Florida in 1566 up to present-day Virginia in 1571, the Jesuit missions wouldn't gain a strong foothold in North America until 1632, with the arrival of the Jesuit Paul Le Jeune. Between 1632 and 1650, 46 French Jesuits arrived in North America to preach among the Indians.

=== Missions ===
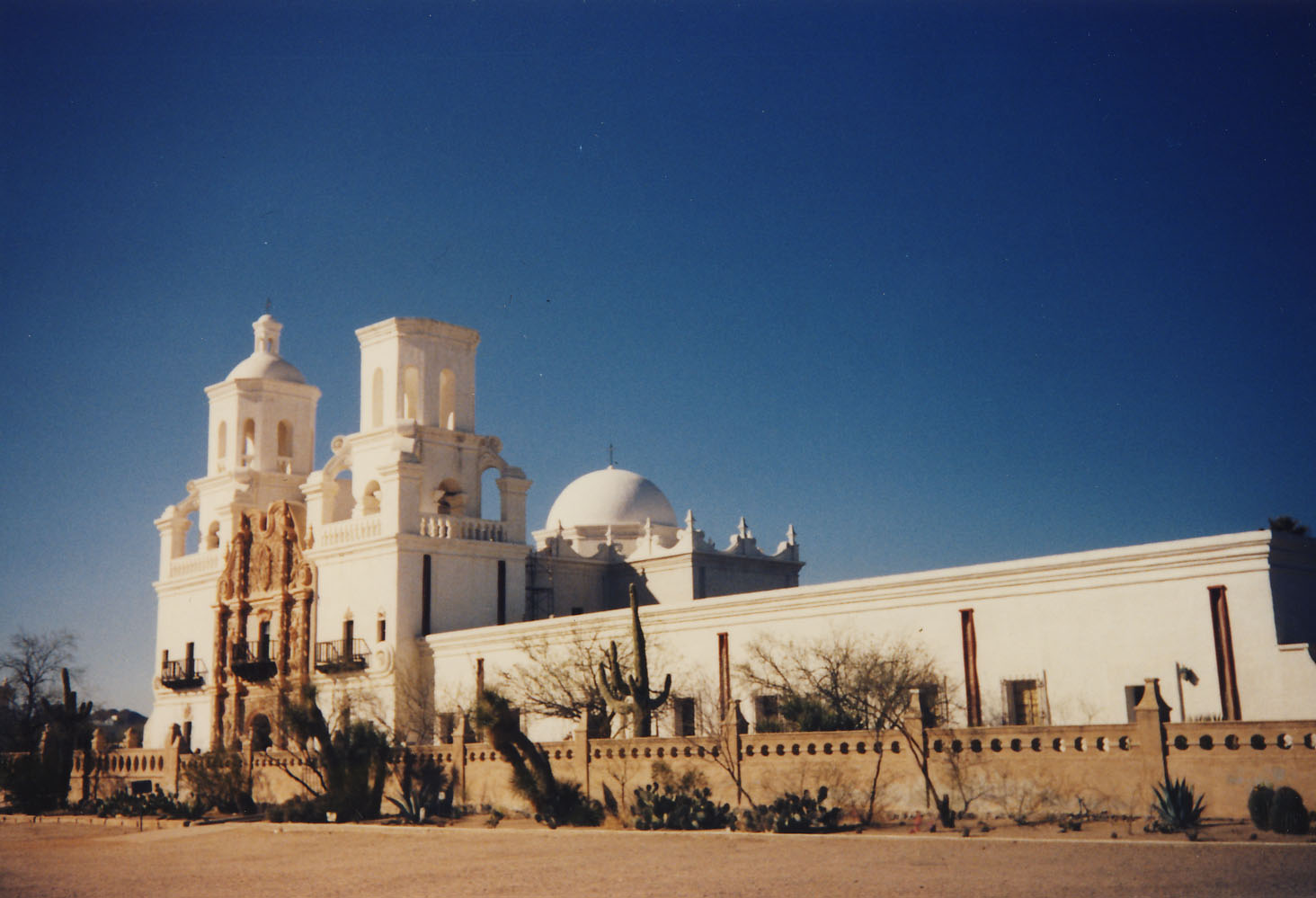
Mission San Xavier del Bac, est. 1692 in the Sonoran Desert, Viceroyalty of New Spain.

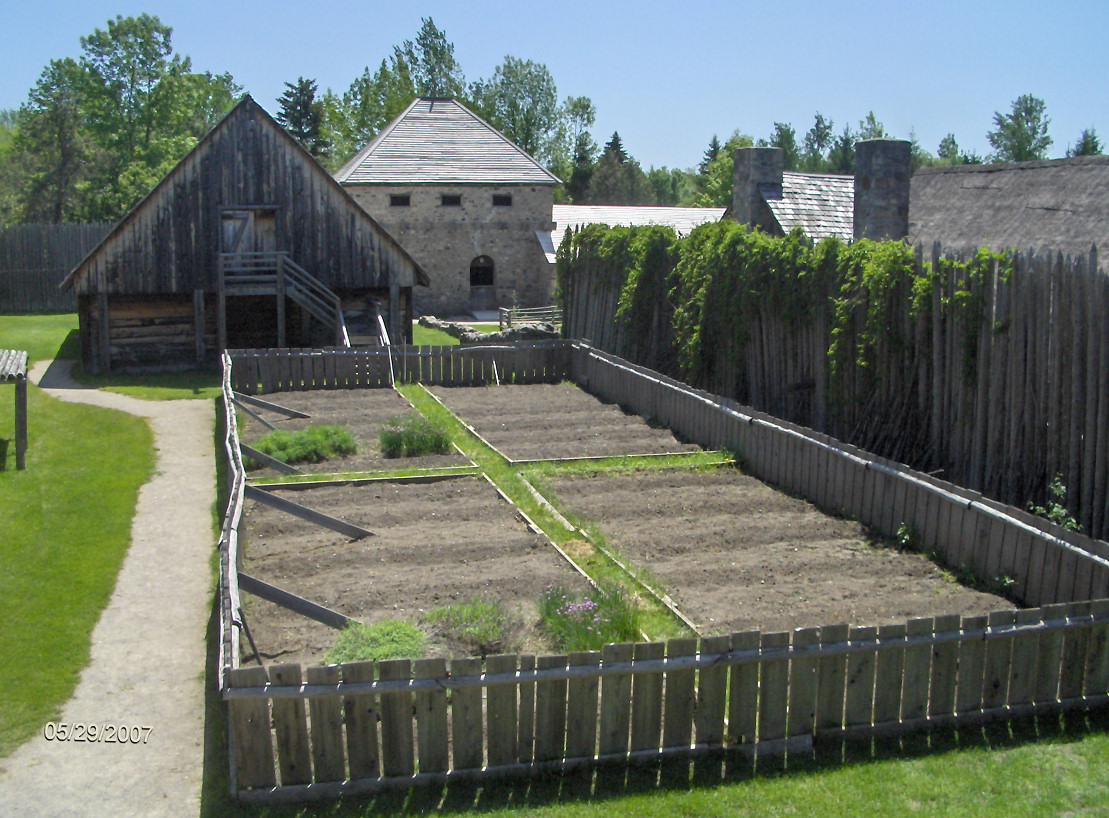
The mission of Sainte-Marie among the Hurons.

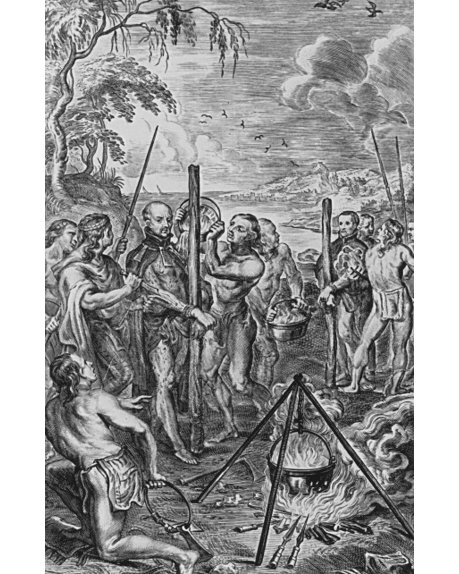
Jean de Brébeuf and Gabriel Lallemant stand ready for boiling water/fire "Baptism" and flaying by the Haudenosaunee in 1649.

==== Viceroyalty of New Spain ====
In the Spanish colonial Viceroyalty of New Spain (colonial México), from 1683 to 1767 the Jesuits established the first twenty missions in Baja California, on the Baja California Peninsula of present-day Mexico.

Also, from 1687 to 1704 the Jesuits established twenty-three missions in the Sonoran Desert, in the Provincias Internas of New Spain, present day northwestern Mexico and southern Arizona.

The Suppression of the Society of Jesus by 1767 in the Spanish Empire led to their expulsion from the Viceroyalty of New Spain. The Franciscans replaced them in supporting existing and establishing new missions from 1768 to 1822 in Spanish North America. In 1774, on the Baja California Peninsula only, the Dominicans replaced the Franciscans in establishing missions.

==== New France ====
In 1634, the Jesuits established a mission in Wendat (Huron) territory under the direction of Jean de Brébeuf. The Mission de Sainte-Marie was quite successful, and considered as "the jewel of the Jesuit mission in New France." More than a decade later it was destroyed by traditional Wendat enemies, the Haudenosaunee (Iroquois), first in 1648 and again in 1649. The Jesuits were killed along with the Wendat. Eight Jesuits—killed between 1642 and 1649—became known as the North American Martyrs.

In 1654, the Jesuits started establishing missions among the Haudenosaunee. In 1656 Sainte Marie among the Iroquois (originally known as Sainte-Marie-de-Ganentaa or St. Mary's of Ganantaa) was the first of these new missions to be established, located among the Onondagas under Father Simon Le Moyne. Within thirteen years, the Jesuits had missions among all five Haudenosaunee nations, in part imposed by French attacks against their villages in present-day New York state. However, as relations between the French and the Haudenosaunee were tense, the missions were all abandoned by 1708. Some converted Haudenosaunee and members of other nations migrated to Canada, where they joined the Jesuit mission village of Kahnawake by 1718.

The Jesuit mission at Detroit was moved to Bois Blanc Island in 1742. The mission was later reestablished in the vicinity of present-day Windsor, closer to the defences at Detroit. The Wendat mission served both native and European residents, with the arrival of French settlers in the area. In 1767, the mission became the Parish of Assumption, the earliest Roman Catholic parish in present-day Ontario.

In the late 1750s, leaders from Kahnawake led 30 families upriver to create a new settlement at Akwesasne, today the largest Mohawk settlement in Canada.

=== Seminaries ===
In order to train young Indians to the Catholic faith, a seminary was opened near Quebec, at Notre-Dame-des-Anges in 1636. The first students were five young Wendat, who were followed by a dozen young Innu and Algonquins in 1638–1639. After first successes, the seminary failed as the young Indians proved reluctant to be educated, and died in great numbers due to infections brought by the Westerners. A second seminary was opened in Trois-Rivières but failed after one year.

=== Reductions ===
A more successful endeavour was the establishment of "reductions", villages where local people were settled under the control of the Jesuits. The reductions in North America were inspired by the Jesuit Reductions of South America, especially those in Paraguay. Reductions were first established for the nomads of the St. Lawrence River valley, at Sillery near Québec and Conception near Trois-Rivières, and later among sedentary peoples such as the Huron-Wendat at Notre-Dame-de-Foy and later Lorette, and the Haudenosaunee at La Prairie de la Madeleine.

One of the most famous reductions was that of Sillery near Quebec, which was established with the financial help of Noël Brûlart de Sillery in 1637. In 1645, there were 167 aboriginal inhabitants in Sillery. The reduction was raided by the Haudenosaunee in 1646. In 1670, Sillery was hit by an epidemic of measles and the Montagnais and Algonquins left the territory. In 1698, the Jesuits abandoned their post there as missionaries and transferred the land to the parish of Notre-Dame-de-Sainte-Foy.

=== Conflict with the Haudenosaunee ===
The efforts of the Jesuits in North America would be constantly hampered by the conflict of the French with the Haudenosaunee. The Wendat Confederacy was essentially destroyed by the effects of warfare with the Haudenosaunee following epidemic infectious diseases from 1634 to 1640. From 1642 to 1649, the Haudenosaunee killed eight Jesuit missionaries, each of whom are now recognized as martyrs by the Catholic Church. A few years later in 1655, while carrying out a reconnaissance mission near Quebec, Jean Ligeois, a lay member of the Jesuit Order was brutally decapitated and scalped. At last, in 1701, the "Grande Paix de Montréal" would end the conflict.

The Jesuits demanded that the Haudenosaunee who converted to the Christian faith also adopt a new approach to politics, thus causing the Haudenosaunee to stop compromising with those who had not converted. They viewed opposition to rituals that bound Haudenosaunee of different clans and nations together as a necessity, since these rituals seemed hopelessly laced with sin and superstition. These differences between the Haudenosaunee converts to Christianity and those that stuck to the traditionalist beliefs created conflicts between the two groups. These led to the traditionalist Haudenosaunee waging violent attacks on the Christian converts. When the Haudenosaunee spiritual value seemed to increase through war victories, this is what caused traditionalist shamans and headmen to win back disciples in the same way that priest had first won them. In the late 1670s, the wars with Susquehannocks and Mahicans ended, causing the Haudenosaunee to have a return to the perceptions of their own spiritual strength. The Jesuits therefore did not like it when they won these battles, with one Jesuit Father Etienne de Carheil writing that there was nothing more harmful to these missions than the Natives' victories over their enemies.

=== Views on French Imperialism ===
In addition to converting Indigenous populations to Catholicism, Jesuits in New France worked to realize the imperial ambitions of the French Crown. While their primary focus was religious conversion, they viewed imperial expansion and economic prosperity as being inextricably linked to proselytization. As a consequence of these beliefs, the Jesuits’ activities in New France were often aligned with the imperial and economic interest of French elites. It should also be noted that the French Jesuits’ imperialist attitudes can be traced back to the early seventeenth century. In the year 1594, King Henry IV, who had been baptized Catholic but raised as Protestant, expelled the Society of Jesus from France following a failed assassination attempt by a student of the Jesuits in France. Nine years later, in 1603, Henry IV converted back to Catholicism and, to prove the sincerity of his conversion, allowed the Society back into France. However, before being allowed back into France, the Society had to accept two stipulations from Henry IV: 1) all Jesuits coming back into France had to be French-born or naturalized Frenchmen, and 2) had to swear an oath of loyalty to the French Crown. As a result, the French Jesuits coming back into France were incredibly homogenous, not only in nationality, but in loyalty to the French Crown as well. In fact, the historical record shows that throughout the early seventeenth century, French Jesuits began promoting Gallicanism, a belief which is rooted in the idea that the French monarch possesses a level of authority over the Catholic Church which rivals that of the Pope.

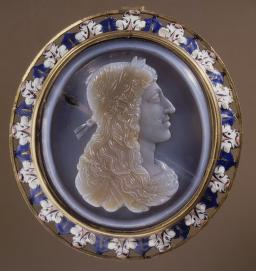
Portrait of Louis XIV as a teenager.

These nationalistic French Jesuits, who were unwavering in their support for the French Crown, would ultimately undertake the missions in New France. Although the missionaries’ primary concern was evangelizing the Indigenous peoples, they also believed that France's imperial expansion throughout New World territory was closely tied to the success of their proselytization efforts. More precisely, they viewed French expansionism in New France as providential, claiming that it had been ordained by Christ Himself because it would inevitably bring more people to the Christian faith. This belief prompted them to support aggressive actions on behalf of French colonists and Indigenous peoples against their enemies to grow the territorial claims of the empire. Historian Bronwen McShea, in one of her works titled Apostles of Empire: The Jesuits and New France, highlighted that this imperial flame burned brighter than ever before after King Louis XIV proved to be a competent ruler. During the early years of Louis XIV’s reign, the Jesuits in New France emphasized that an important element of their mission was to pursue the worldly interests of New France, while maintaining that this pursuit was tied to their ultimate goal of Christianizing the New World. By the 1660s, the language in the Relations grew increasingly imperialistic, as Jesuit missionaries began calling for a French crusade against the Haudenosaunee—-claiming that it would lead to “a beautiful French kingdom and a great Christian empire, fittingly ruled by a descendant of St. Louis.”

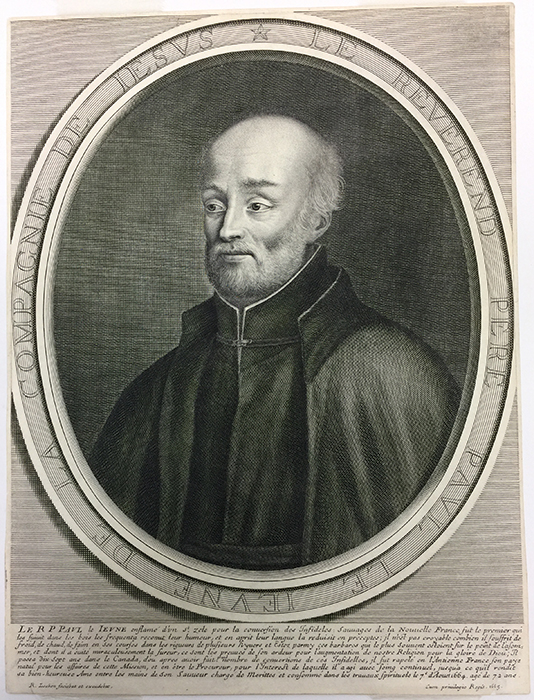
Portrait of Paul Le Jeune, leader of founding era Jesuit missions.

Le Jeune’s early writings make it strikingly clear that the Jesuits missionaries in New France saw a strong connection between proselytization and economic prosperity. As mentioned previously, their primary focus was converting Indigenous populations to Catholicism, but they also believed that economic prosperity was a prerequisite for any large-scale conversion of the Indigenous populations in America. In other words, they believed that it would be impossible to convert the Indigenous populations to Catholicism as long as their economic circumstances remained dire, writing that “[great] poverty stifles the spirit.” In his view, French colonial development was the solution to this problem. He urged French developers to invest in the New World, hoping that it would bring economic prosperity to the Indigenous populations, which would in turn open their hearts to Catholicism. For example, he argued that if French settlers could establish a profitable agricultural business in Quebec, it would improve the material well-being of the Indigenous peoples, making them more likely to accept Christianity. At the same time, he contended that such an investment would also strengthen the empire by providing valuable resources like grain, ore, and timber. He also contended that such population growth in the French empire would produce enormous benefits. Historian Catherine O’Donnell, who has extensively studied the Jesuit missions in North America, describes the early Jesuits as “both evangelists and agents of empire.”

=== Decline in Support for the Missions ===
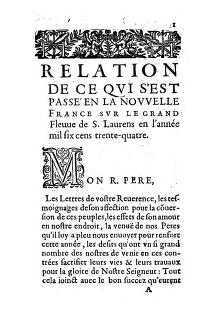
Le Jeune's Relation of missionary activities in New France in the year 1634.

Throughout the late seventeenth and eighteenth centuries, support for the French Jesuits in New France gradually waned, leading to the decline of their missions. By 1680, the Jesuit Relations were no longer being published, and the Royal Court had moved from Paris to Versailles, making it much harder for the Jesuit missionaries to update the French elite about new developments in New France. Furthermore, by the mid-seventeenth century, the projects in New France had become low priority for senior-level Jesuit leadership in the Parisian bureaucracy. As early as 1656, this concern surfaced when Louis Cellot, a Jesuit provincial in Paris, appeared before the Superior-General. He alleged that the missionaries in New France were more focused on worldly matters than on proselytizing, even tolerating prostitution, in hopes of redirecting resources from that mission to projects elsewhere. These bureaucratic tactics would prove to be quite successful, as the Jesuit mission in New France grew increasingly less popular and the missionaries struggled to secure the staffing resources necessary to sustain their project. The Age of Enlightenment, which began in the late seventeenth century, also contributed to the declining support for the Jesuit missions in New France. During this period, arguments in favor of secularism and religious freedom were gaining momentum among French elites, government officials, and intellectuals. This prompted a cultural transformation among the French elite class in which they were much less concerned with the spread of Catholicism and much more concerned with the profitability of their investments overseas. This development had an immensely negative impact on the Jesuit mission in New France because the Jesuits relied heavily upon the resources of French elites and officials to fund their projects.

=== Further expansion ===
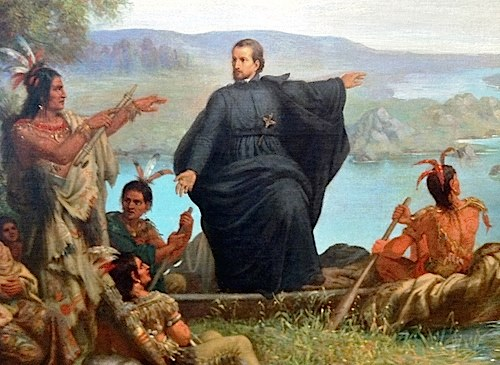
Father Jacques Marquette with Indians.

By 1667 the Jesuits had established a station near present-day Green Bay, Wisconsin. The Illiniwek whom they met there are reported to have asked the French to send a missionary to them in their home country. In 1668 Father Jacques Marquette was moved by his Jesuit superiors to missions farther up the St. Lawrence River in the western Great Lakes region. He helped found missions at Sault Ste. Marie in present-day Michigan in 1668, St. Ignace in 1671, and at La Pointe on Lake Superior near the present-day city of Ashland, Wisconsin. In 1673, Marquette and French-Canadian explorer Louis Jolliet undertook an additional journey to explore the Mississippi River as far south as the mouth of the Arkansas River.

During the late 1690s, the Jesuits expanded along the middle of the Mississippi River, in competition with the Seminary of Foreign Missions of Quebec (a branch of the Paris Foreign Missions Society). In 1700, the Jesuits established themselves at the mouth of the River Des Peres. From 1703 a large Jesuit establishment was based at Kaskaskia in Illinois country, when Jacques Gravier was appointed vicar general of the Illinois Mission. He was located in Fort de Chartres.

Many of the missionaries compiled studies or dictionaries of the First Nations and Native American languages which they learned. For instance, Jacques Gravier compiled the most extensive Kaskaskia Illinois-French dictionary among works of the missionaries before his death in 1708. It was not edited and published until 2002, but the work has contributed to the Miami Tribe of Oklahoma's language revitalization project with Miami University in Oxford, Ohio.

In June 1735, Father Jean-Pierre Aulneau de la Touche received an assignment as chaplain and set out for Fort St. Charles on Lake of the Woods in an area now in Ontario, Canada and Minnesota, United States. He sailed through the Great Lakes to Fort St. Charles along with Pierre Gaultier de La Vérendrye, commander of the western district. At the time, Father Aulneau was posted farther west than any other missionary in North America. The following year Father Aulneau, Jean Baptiste de La Vérendrye, and 19 French-Canadian voyageurs were sent from Fort St. Charles to Fort Michilimackinac to pick up supplies for an expedition to the Mandan people in what is today the North and South Dakota. On June 8, 1736, their first night out and within several kilometres of the fort, all members of the expedition were killed by "Prairie Sioux" warriors on a nearby island in Lake of the Woods. The massacre was allegedly in retaliation for commander La Vérendrye's practice of supplying guns to Sioux enemies.

Great Britain took over colonial rule of Canada and the lands east of the Mississippi River in 1763 after the Seven Years' War. In Quebec they allowed the Jesuits to continue to minister to First Nations villages.

The Jesuits maintained a presence until their order was suppressed in France. They were officially expelled from Louisiana in 1763. At that time twenty-seven of them were officiating from Quebec to Louisiana. After the Order was restored by Pope Pius VII in 1814, Jesuits resumed missionary work in Louisiana from around 1830.

Several Belgian men came to study at Whitemarsh, near Bowie, Maryland, in the early 1820s. They all had volunteered to be missionaries to Native Americans. Father Pierre-Jean De Smet, who started working in Missouri in 1830, would eventually build strong relationships with leaders of numerous tribes of the West, including Sitting Bull, war chief of the Sioux. Through the nineteenth century, Jesuit priests founded missions and schools among Native tribes in present-day Montana and Idaho.

The Canadian residential schools, who caused a detriment to several generations of First Nations children and youth who were silenced and abused within their walls, consisted schools run by Jesuits. The residential schools that the Jesuits took part in functioned in a way so as to bring about indigenous assimilation and to gain their lands. Canadian Ojibwe writer Basil Johnston represents this Jesuit oppression by writing survival humor themes of students at his own Ontario Jesuit-run residential school in the 1930s, while also narrating a more general strategy of resistance by students and their families.

Prior to the Civil War, Jesuit plantations in the United States owned African-American slaves and participated in the Trans-Atlantic slave trade. In 1838, to raise funds Georgetown University in Washington, D.C. sold 272 African-American slaves to plantation owners in Louisiana for the current-day equivalent of three million dollars. Jesuits also owned slaves in other states. In 2017, the Jesuits apologized for their involvement and announced measures to recognize and atone for the university's participation in the slave trade. Following the Civil War, the Jesuits established operations in the African-American community inviting them community to worship at their St. Ignatius Church in Baltimore in the 1850s and starting Black parishes and schools in Florida (including St. Peter Claver Catholic School in Tampa) some decades later. The congregation would later shift away from Black ministry in response to various factors, including racist opposition and threats of violence.

== Methods ==
The Jesuits in America used methods which were comparatively respectful of the traditional way of life of the Indians, especially compared to the approach of the Puritans in New England, who required a conformity to their code of dress and behaviour. In a simplification, the 19th-century Protestant historian Francis Parkman wrote: "Spanish civilization crushed the Indian; English civilization scorned and neglected him; French civilization embraced and cherished him."

Jesuit missionaries learned Indian languages and accepted Indian ways to the point of conforming to them, especially when living among them. According to Jérôme Lalemant, a missionary must first have "penetrated their thoughts... adapted himself to their manner of living and, when necessary, been a Barbarian with them." To gain the Indians' confidence, the Jesuits drew parallels between Catholicism and Indian practices, making connections to the mystical dimension and symbolism of Catholicism (pictures, bells, incense, candlelight), giving out religious medals as amulets, and promoting the benefits of the cult of relics.

The Jesuits were surprised and even indignant toward the Natives' refusal to adapt to what they believed as God's law and nonetheless their continual practicing of what they saw as time-honored customs. Additionally, while attempting to show a commonality between their Catholic faith and the practices of the Native Americans, held some internal frustrations at the Natives refusal to assimilate to the faith rapidly. A prominent French Jesuit, Father Brebeuf, was one priest who tried to find similarities between the cultures, but ultimately decided to fall back to Catholic theistic practices when he couldn't comprehend Native behaviors. With regard to Jesuit Father Francois Le Mercier, he strongly suggested that it was the Natives' having “recourse” to St. Joseph and their vowing to have said a novena of masses which prompted God to save his and Brebeuf's lives and their mission. Le Mercier thus was unable to find a natural explanation, which formed a large part of the Jesuits' writings, for his and Brebeuf's deliverance from danger. This inability is one example that shows how the Jesuits moved beyond the natural explanations and explained events theistically when facing the incomprehensibility of an alien culture.

The concept of going to Hell if one did not convert to Catholicism and the idea that Native practices were evil was a method which the Jesuits used in order to get the Natives to convert. French Jesuit Father Paul Le Jeune, who arrived on Haudenosaunee land in 1632, was one such priest who used this fear tactic. He believed that little by little the Natives would give up their “evil customs.” When Spanish Jesuit Juan Rogel was evangelizing to the Native Florida cacique, or king, in 1565, he told the cacique that the Natives' belief that their ancestors saw God at the time of burials was invalid and that their ancestors actually saw the Devil. In 1600, in the Acaxee territory within Sinaloa, Mexico, Jesuit Father Alonso Santaren, alongside Captain Diego de Avila, used physical punishment and in at least one case, execution, to root out the practices that they believed allowed Satan to maintain a hold on the Indian mind. On December 7, in an attempt to find hidden idols or piles of bones, Diego and Santaren discovered skeletal remains in houses and then placed them in a pile in the center of the village. Before burning the idols and forcing the Natives to watch this, Santaren commanded a guard to give four lashes to an old Native man who refused to hand over his ancestral bones.

The Spanish Jesuit missionaries in New Mexico did not prepare themselves for missionary groups with different language groups. The Natives were also required to provide entertainment to the Jesuit missionaries in their villages. Additionally, the Natives were given no period of request for missionaries, wherein they could have been prepared by their leaders to receive the missionaries. There was a forced labor program that both the Spanish government and Jesuit missionaries imposed on the Natives. This forced Native people to assimilate to not only Jesuit customs, but Spanish life in general, including the family ways and morality of the Spanish colonists. In Mexico, the Jesuits were complicit the mistreatment of Afro-Mexicans, or people of mixed African and Native Mexican blood, which was waged by pure Native Mexicans. Although the pure Native Mexicans were likely also oppressed by these and/or other colonial forces, Native Mexicans that also had African blood mixed in are the ones who suffered harder. Located in Xalmolonga within the Toluca region, the Jesuits held the most notable concentration of slaves in Mexico here. The Jesuits treated them with the same reputation of illegitimacy as the pure Native Mexicans did, which came from being born out of wedlock or being born of illegitimate unions.

== Spanish Jesuit missions in North America ==
- Ajacán Mission
- Spanish missions in Arizona
- Spanish missions in Baja California
- Spanish missions in California
- Spanish missions in the Sonoran Desert
- Missions in Spanish Florida
- Spanish missions in Texas
- Suppression of the Society of Jesus – expelled and replaced by the Franciscan mission program

== See also ==
- Jesuit history in Central and South America
- Franco-Indian alliance
- List of Jesuit sites
- List of Spanish missions
- Jesuit China missions
- Eusebio Kino
