= Kahnawake Iroquois and the Rebellions of 1837–1838 =

The Haudenosaunee Mohawk community of Kahnawake played a unique role in the Lower Canada Rebellions, part of the greater Rebellions of 1837.

Situated between the Montréal and Lachine British-Army headquarters and the Patriote-friendly Châteauguay River Valley, the Kahnawake꞉ronon rapidly found a place in this context of civil war and revolutionary crisis.

== Aiding British armed forces ==
Existing works have discussed to some extent the involvement of the Kahnawake꞉ronon on three different occasions during which they intervened by cooperating with the British:

- On 13 December 1837, about 150 Kahnawake men quickly responded to a government request to mobilize in Lachine for the purpose of repelling a feared attack by Patriotes;
- On 4 November 1838, the Kahnawake꞉ronon apprehended seventy-five armed Patriotes, led by many including François-Maurice Lepailleur, who had come to Kahnawake in a failed attempt to borrow arms and obtain Native support; the Haudenosaunee had feared for their lives and, under the leadership of Antoine-George de Lorimier (the son of Claude-Nicolas-Guillaume de Lorimier) and others, they refused to give in to Patriote threats. After the Patriotes had quietly arrived near the old St-Jean Baptiste Chapel, they were met by ten Kahnawake men. Despite coming close to a shootout, the two sides settled on the use of diplomacy. The Kahnawake꞉ronon invited the Patriotes into the center of the village with the false promise of arms and support for the Patriote cause. The trap worked, and the Kahnawake men proceeded to easily arrest and disarm the Châteauguay Patriotes, many of whom claimed had been forced to march on the Haudenosaunee village.
- From 11 to 16 November 1838, 200 Kahnawake men joined volunteers and soldiers to wage battle on Patriotes thought to be hidden in Châteauguay. Finding the place deserted, government soldiers and Kahnawake warriors proceeded to pillage it.

== November 1838 raid on Kahnawake ==
Kahnawake oral history accounts that a local unnamed woman searching the bushes for her lost cow saw the Patriotes and alerted the community. Although this account is often dismissed by non-Native historians, there are some sources that indicate that Kahnawake resident Marie Kawananoron did indeed see the Patriotes at the outskirts of the village. Although the subsequent events are more complex, including a trap set up by the Mohawks to lure the Patriotes into the village, the oral account does seem to have some documentary evidence to support it.

Investigators have traditionally failed to take on an insider's perspective of the Rebellions as they were lived and assessed by the Kahnawake꞉ronon. Further, when attempts have been made to explore the underlying causes of Kahnawake's involvement, interpretive research has been quite limited. There has been a generalized tendency to view the Kahnawake꞉ronon as a group of loyal Indians acting in defense of the British Crown.

On the contrary, the actions of the Kahnawake꞉ronon were not necessarily grounded in an outright allegiance to the British Crown. Indeed, it is possible that a wide and complex mixture of socio-economic, political, and cultural factors shaped the behavior of the community, in general, and of specific Kahnawake people. Some of these factors are heavily detailed in the letters of, Joseph Marcoux, the secular priest residing in Kahnawake during the time of the Rebellions.

For instance, at the time, the Indian Department was seeking ways to reduce its expenses by curtailing annuities it had been providing to Native people. By collaborating with the Crown, the people of Kahnawake may have been hoping to maintain the flow of annual presents, and thus protect interests which they felt belonged to them as "Indians". Also, in, perhaps the relations between Kahnawake and its French-Canadian neighbours as well as between the former and the Patriotes were marked by mutual mistrust and suspicion. These relationships did indeed shape Kahnawake's intervention. Given the relative importance of factionalism in Haudenosaunee political culture, the village of Kahnawake experienced internal disputes at the time of the Rebellions. Studies have suggested that despite the common presence of divisive tendencies within Native American communities, whose sense of collective identity can prevail in the face of an external threat to resources, land, and identity. In the case of the Rebellions, a perceived external threat to Native land, life, and identity effectively united the entire Kahnawake community. Finally, the oral historical tradition of Kahnawake maintains that the Kahnawake꞉ronon intervened in the Rebellions in order to protect their land and express their identity. Drawing on this tradition, David Blanchard writes that it

"was not necessary to reward the Kanienkehaka for defending their own lands. By defending their land, the Kanienkehaka had not joined with the British against the French. They had simply been protecting the interests of the people of Kahnawake. Such a defense did not make the Kanienkehaka pro-British or anti-French. It simply showed that they were Kanienkehaka.""

The documentary record does show that in the end, the will to defend land and identity, united the Kahnawake꞉ronon and ultimately shaped their intervention. Factional disputes which enhanced individual interests among Kahnawake residents during the 1830s were temporarily dissolved. Based on recent research, it can therefore be concluded that the decision of the Kahnawake꞉ronon to intervene in the Rebellions may have been prompted by a powerful desire to protect common interests as well as a strong community will to defend and express a collective identity.

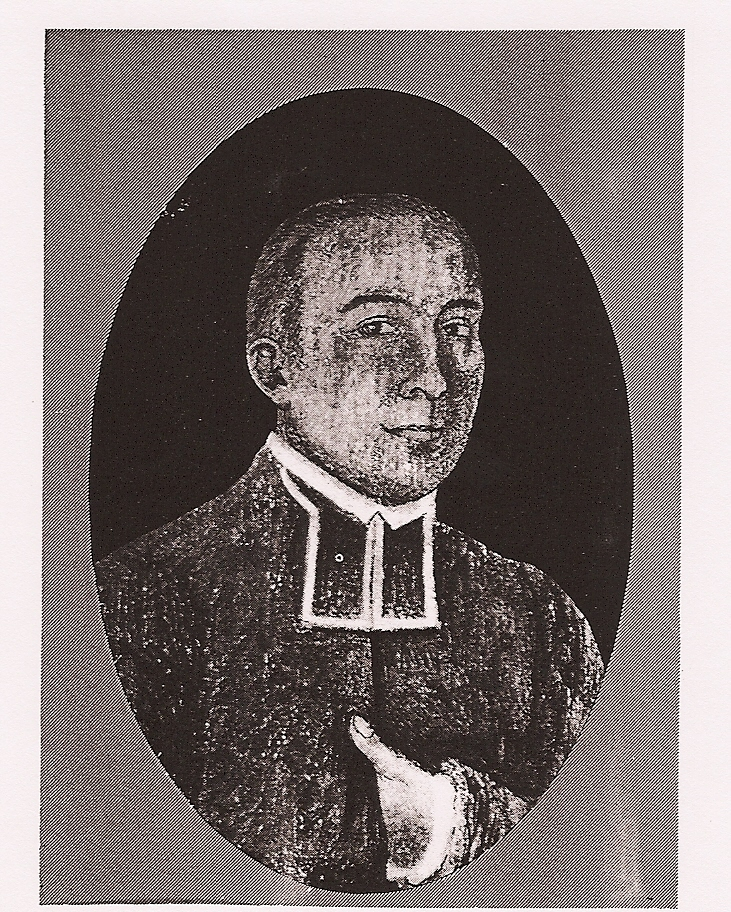

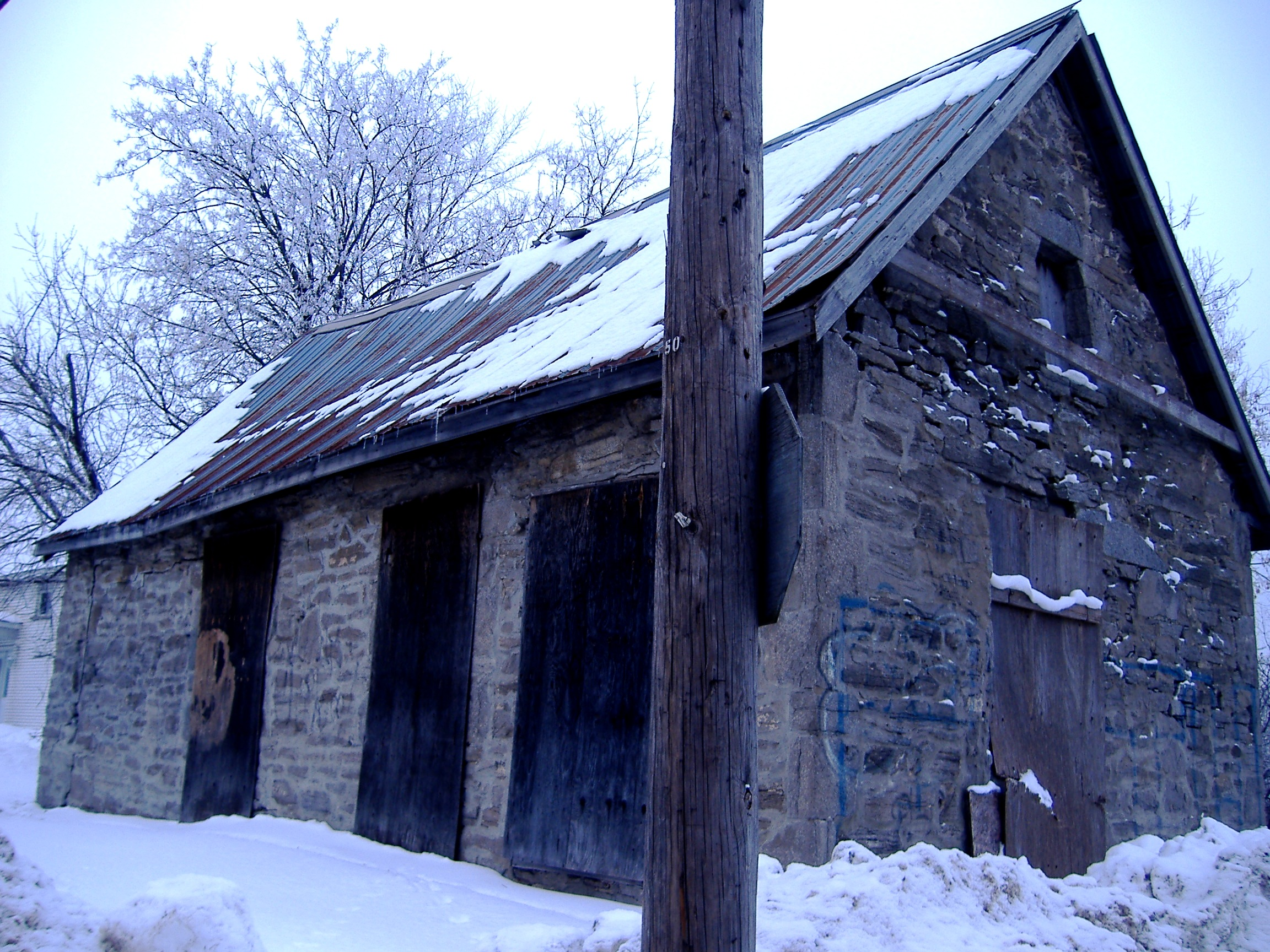

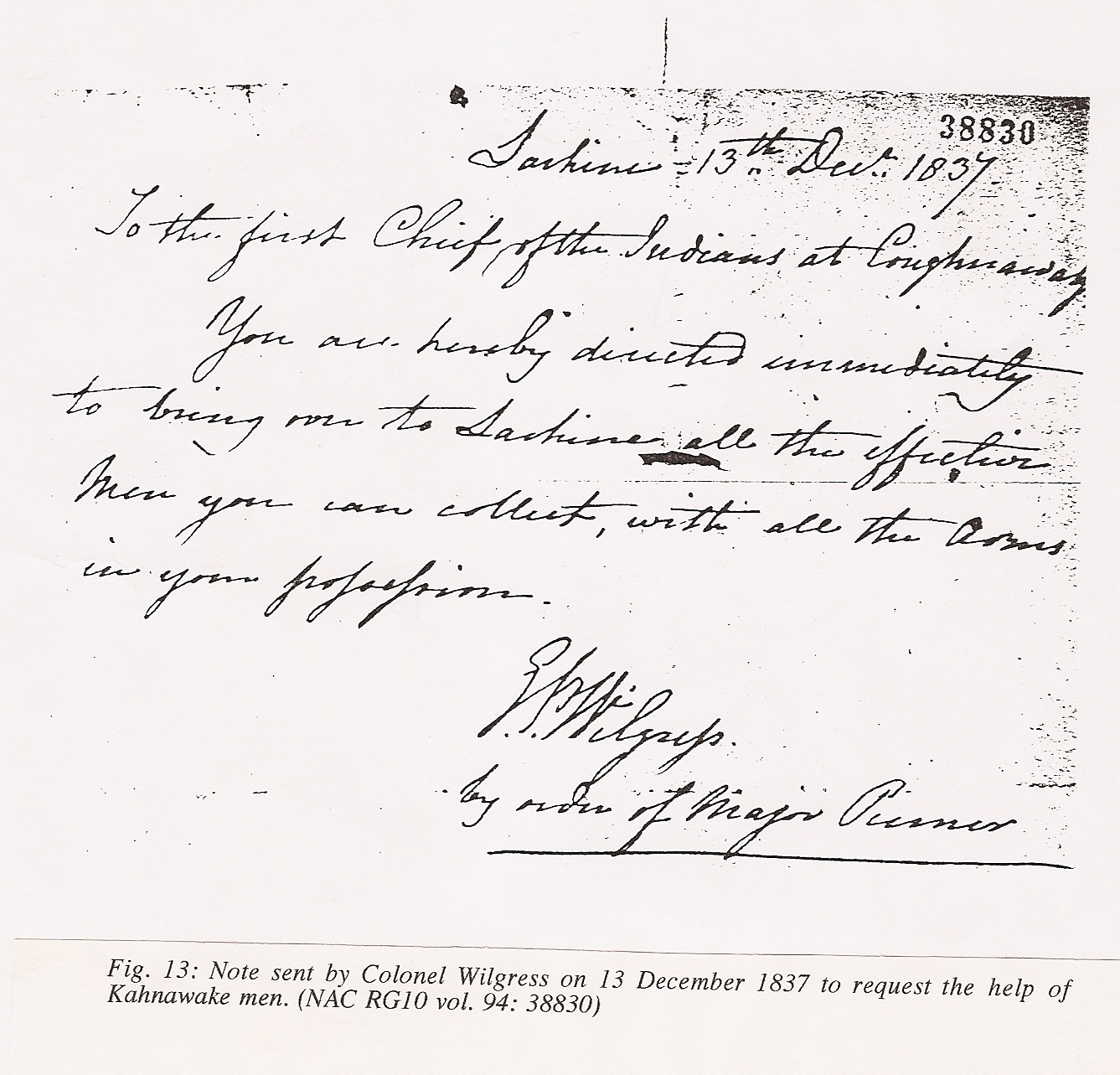

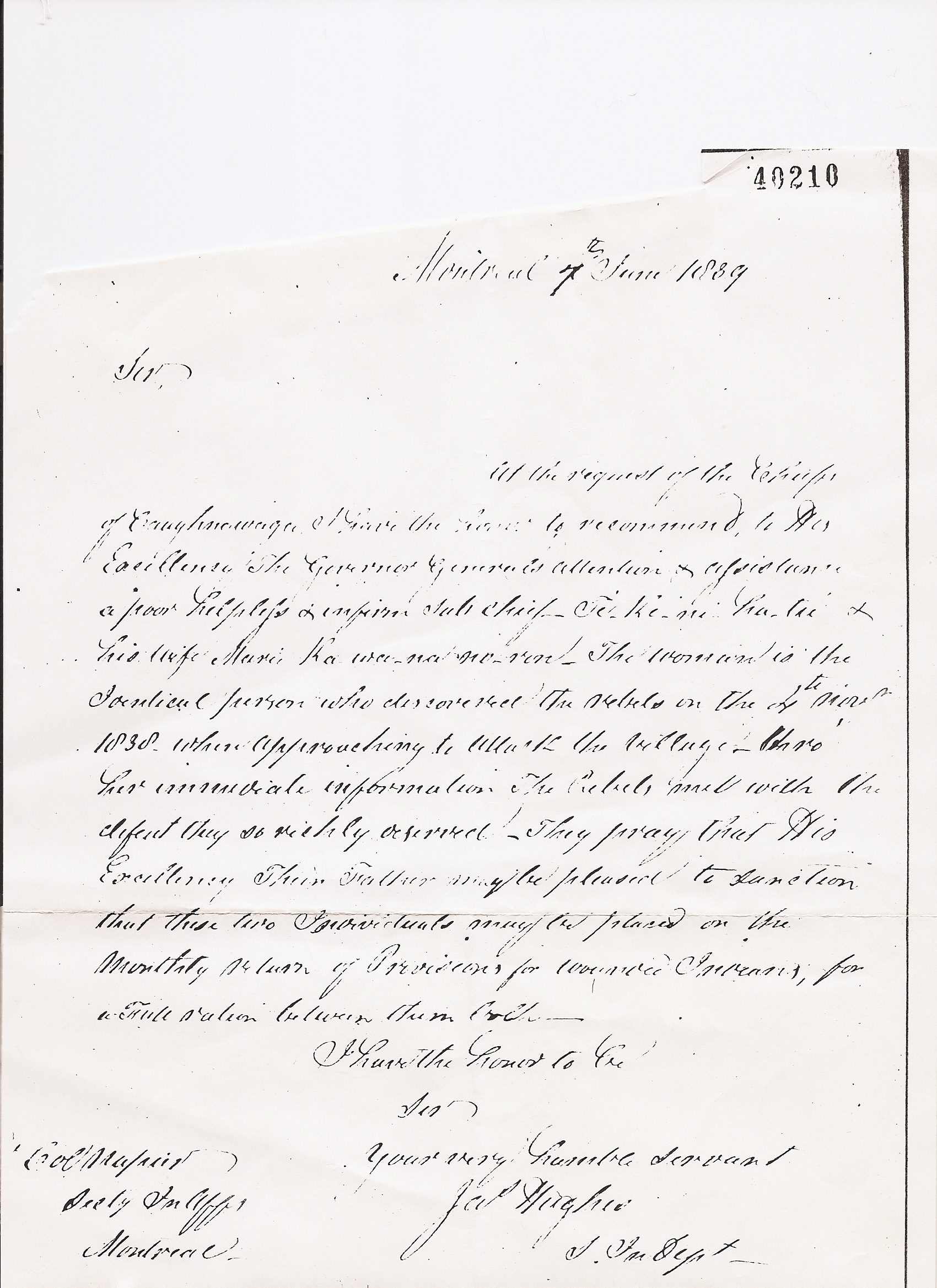

== See also ==
- Rebellions of 1837
- Lower Canada Rebellion
- Claude-Nicolas-Guillaume de Lorimier

French Wikipedia article: fr:Attitude des Amérindiens du Bas-Canada lors des rébellions de 1837-1838
