= KKIC =

KKIC may refer to:

- the ICAO code for Mesa Del Rey Airport, in King City, California, United States
- KKIC-LD, a low-power television station (channel 16) licensed to Boise, Idaho, United States
- CKKI-FM, a radio station in Kahnawake, Quebec, Canada that uses "KKIC" as a branding
