= Pierre de Lauzon =

Pierre de Lauzon (known as Gannenrontié among the Iroquois) (bapt. September 13, 1687, Leignes-sur-Fontaine, Vienne, France—September 5, 1742, Quebec) was a noted eighteenth-century Jesuit missionary in New France. Although sometimes mentioned as Jean, in his official acts he invariably signed Pierre. From 1732 to 1739 he was superior of all the Jesuit missions in Canada.

== Background ==
Lauzon was the son of lawyer Pierre de Lauzon and his wife Marguerite Riot. After classical studies at the Jesuit college in Poitiers, he entered the novitiate with the Jesuits at Bordeaux on November 26, 1703. He studied logic and physics in Limoges, 1705 to 1707, and was a professor from 1707 to 1710. After a third year studying philosophy in Limoges, he taught rhetoric there until 1712. He then studied theology in Bordeaux, and, four years later, was ordained a priest.

== In Canada ==
After ordination Lauzon was sent to Canada, in 1716. From 1716 to 1718 he was Pierre-Daniel Richer's assistant at the mission at Lorette. There he studied the Huron and Iroquois languages. He did missionary duty at Sault St. Louis (Caughnawaga) from 1718 to 1731. He made his solemn profession of the four vows at Sault St. Louis on February 2, 1721. He was absent from Sault St. Louis only for the scholastic year 1721-22, when he replaced François Le Brun as instructor in the royal school of hydrography in the college at Quebec, as the exhausting labours of the mission had undermined his health.

The Caughnawaga Iroquois clamoured for his return, and on May 12, 1722 they formally petitioned Governor Philippe de Rigaud Vaudreuil and Intendant Michel Bégon to that effect. There were other grievances mentioned in the petition as well. The Iroquois felt that the proposed reestablishment of a French garrison in the settlement was an insult to their loyalty and a danger to their wives and daughters.

Rigaud feared that the Indians would abandon their alliance with the French and perhaps even go over to the English. It was Lauzon who had earlier prevented two-thirds of the Indians from moving away and settling within easy reach of the English, and therefore Rigaud urged the superior to send him back. In 1722 Lauzon returned to Sault St. Louis.

== As superior of the Jesuit missions ==
In 1723 he was named superior of the Caughnawaga mission, replacing Julien Garnier. The ability he displayed in governing during the nine succeeding years determined the general, Franz Retz, to place him in 1732 over the whole Canada mission. This, according to established custom in Canada, entailed the duties of rector of the college at Quebec. In September he took up his new offices, succeeding Jean-Baptiste Duparc.

During his term of office, which lasted seven years, he crossed over to France (1733) in quest of recruits. Among those whom he brought back with him was the Jean-Pierre Aulneau, massacred in 1736 at the Lake of the Woods, and Luc-François Nau. Pierre-Herman Dosquet of Quebec returned at the same time, bringing with him three Sulpicians. The party sailed aboard the warship Rubis on May 29 and reached Quebec on August 16, after a distressing voyage of eighty days. Terrific winds and pestilential disease marked the long journey, and twenty people died. Lauzon, besides ministering to the sick, as did the other priests on board, was appointed boatswain's mate, for all the passengers had to share in the work.

== Return to Caughnawaga ==
In 1739 Jean-Baptiste de Saint-Pé succeeded him as superior of the Jesuit missions. In September, Lauzon resumed his missionary labours with the Caughnawaga Iroquois. There, he defended the Indians against charges in France of disloyalty and illicit trade with the English. In a 1741 report to Pierre François de Rigaud, governor of Trois-Rivières, Lauzon recounted the services the Caughnawaga Iroquois had rendered France against other Indians and the English. He also rejected the accusations of engaging in trade that had been brought against the Jesuits at the mission. These accusations developed into the Tournois-Desauniers affair. The Jesuit Jean-Baptiste Tournois was accused of being in a business partnership with the Misses Desauniers and promoting their store among the Indians. On April 12, 1742, the minister, Jean-Frédéric Phélypeaux, ordered the store closed and directed Lauzon to take further steps to prevent the Iroquois from going over to the English.

Owing to failing strength Lauzon was recalled to Quebec in 1741, where he died the following year, after a short illness of two and a half days.
