= Esther Louise Georgette Deer =

American singer (1891–1992)

Princess White Deer
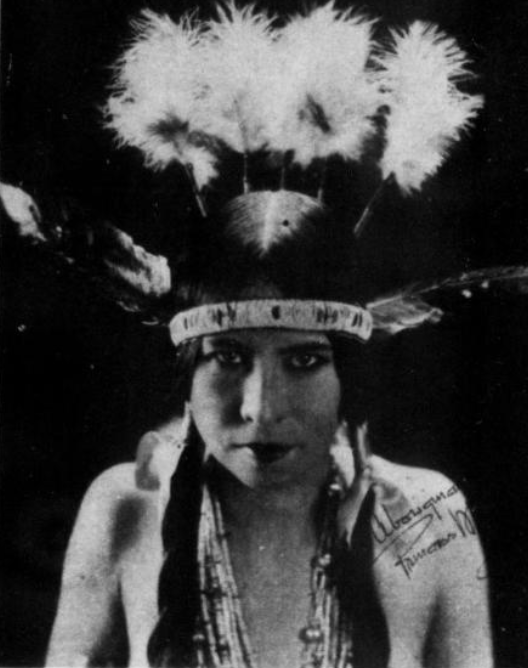
- Deer in a 1927 publicity photograph
- Born: Esther Louise Georgette Deer; November 2, 1891; New York City
- Died: February 1992 (aged 100)
- Other name: Ken-Tio-Kwi-Osta
- Occupations: Singer; dancer; activist

Esther Louise Georgette Deer (November 2, 1891 – February 1992) was a Native American dancer, singer, and activist. She was of the Mohawk tribe. She performed under the name Princess White Deer as part of The Famous Deer Brothers, a family stage act, which toured the United States, Europe and South Africa. She returned to America as the country was preparing to enter World War I, and participated in war bond rallies, where she was noticed by Florenz Ziegfeld Jr. She joined his Ziegfeld Follies, and became one of its principal artists. She also lobbied to have the rights of Native Americans recognized in America.

Deer died at the age of 100.

== Early life ==
Born in 1891, Deer was born in New York City, the daughter of James David Deer and Georgette Osborn Deer. Often said to be of "genuine Native American descent", Deer's paternal family originated from the Kahnawake Mohawk Territory in Québec, Canada. She was the granddaughter of Chief John Running Deer, the last keeper of the Akwesasne Wolf Belt.

== Career ==
Deer began performing as a child alongside her family members. At age eleven, she joined The Famous Deer Brothers, Champion Indian Trick Riders of the World. Deer performed in Wild West shows throughout her teenage years, often starring in "shows [that] presented a romantic version of the American west from the point of view of the white colonizers and were very popular during the late 1800s and early 1900s." Around 1905, they relabeled their act as The Deer Family Wild West Show and began performing throughout Europe.

By her late 20s, Deer had a solo career. She spent some years in Europe, living primarily in Russia where she was briefly married. After World War I began, Deer came back to the United States and began performing as means to fundraise for the government's war funds. By the 1920s, Deer began performing in vaudeville and had become well known during her time period, especially as a Native American woman.

In 1925, Deer debuted a play she wrote, in which she also starred, titled From Wigwam to White Lights. She had been quite successful during her time on stage, performing alongside well-known performers such as Will Rogers, Eddie Cantor, George M. Cohan, Harry Houdini, W.C. Fields, and George Gershwin in Ziegfeld shows and four Broadway musicals.

=== Theatrical credits ===
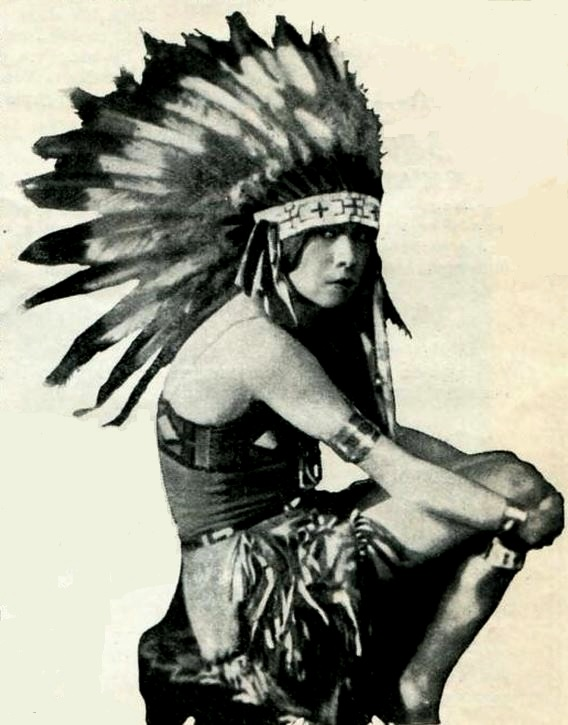
Princess White Deer, performer in the Ziegfeld 9 O'clock Frolic

The following list is incomplete.

- Lucky (Mar 22, 1927 - May 21, 1927) ... as Strawberry
- The Yankee Princess (Oct 02, 1922 - Dec 09, 1922) ... as Indian Dancer
- 9 O'clock Frolic (Feb 08, 1921 - Mar 1921) ... as Princess White Deer
- Ziegfeld Midnight Frolic (Feb 01, 1921 - unknown) ... as Princess White Deer
- Tip Top (Oct 05, 1920 - May 7, 1921) ... as Wetonah
- Dance to the Great Spirit
- Hitchy Koo 1919

== Activism ==
Outside of her entertainment career, Deer was also well known for her activism and humanitarian work. She encouraged Native American women to vote, and was called "A Susan B. Anthony of the American Indians" in 1921. In 1927 she named and dedicated New Jersey's Lake Mohawk in 1927, and was named Queen of the Lake at its tenth anniversary celebrations in 1937. White Deer Plaza in the Lake Mohawk community is named for her. She supported a number of charities in her lifetime, most notably American Indian Defense Association. She had worked alongside President Roosevelt in 1937, inviting him and a Canadian delegation to a meeting of the Grand Council of Chiefs of the Six Nations of the Iroquois. By the late 1930s, Deer had retired from the performing arts and had focused all of her attention on her activism work instead.

== Legacy ==
Deer died in 1992, a few weeks after her 100th birthday. In 1980, there was an exhibit of Deer's theatrical costumes, scrapbooks, and other memorabilia at the Kanien'Kehaka Cultural Centre in Caughnawaga, organized by her great-niece. In 2017, there was a similar exhibit at the historical museum in Sparta, New York.
