= Joseph Marcoux =

Canadian Catholic missionary

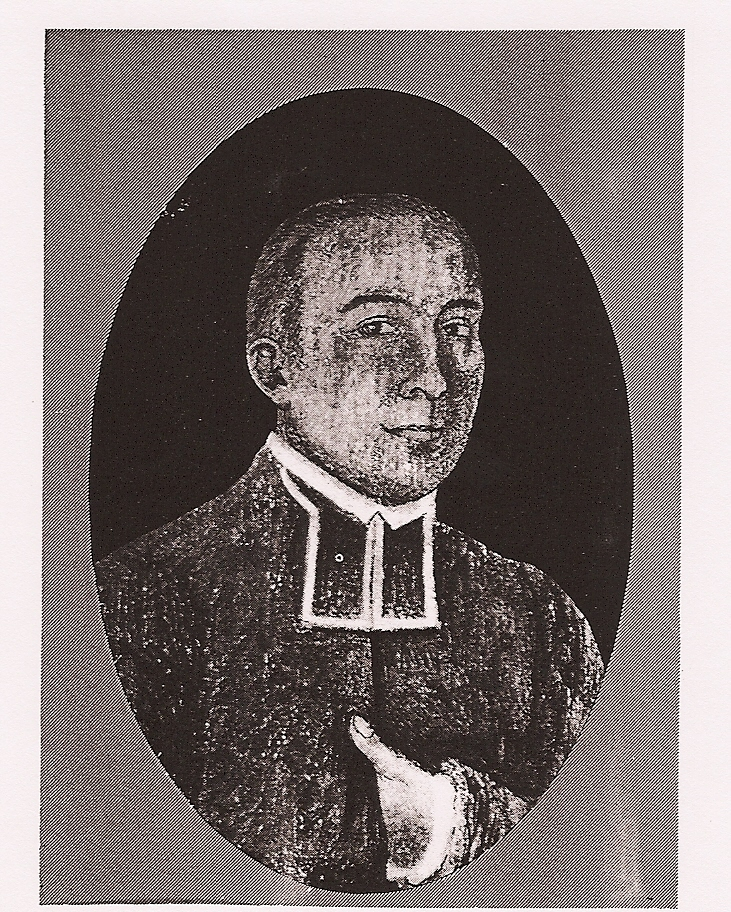
Joseph Marcoux

Joseph Marcoux (16 March 1791 – 29 May 1855) was a Canadian Catholic missionary among the Haudenosaunee. Fluent in Mohawk, Marcoux was also known as Tharoniakanere, "the one who looks up to the sky".

== Life ==
Marcoux travelled to the mission at St. Regis in 1812, where he was instructed by Jean-Baptiste Roupe. During the War of 1812, Marcoux escaped the American attack on the mission on 23 October 1812. After being ordained by Roupe on 12 January 1813, Marcoux succeeded him at St. Regis.

For the remaining forty-two years of his life, Marcoux worked to evangelize the Haudenosaunee, first at St. Regis, later at other missions at Kahnawake (Sault-St-Louis) and Lac des Deux Montagnes.

He was a close friend and regular correspondent of Bishop Michael Power, and in 1838 joined him in signing a statement of loyalty to Queen Victoria in response to rebellions in the regions around Montreal.

A noted linguist, Marcoux compiled early reference materials on the Mohawk language. He taught the language to Jean-André Cuoq, who went on to a linguistic career of his own.

In 1855, Marcoux died of typhoid fever, at that time epidemic among the Haudenosaunee.

== Works ==
He wrote Iroquois grammar and a French–Iroquois dictionary. For his church and schools, he translated into Iroquois François de Ligny's Histoire de la vie de Notre Seigneur Jésus-Christ, and published in their language a collection of prayers, hymns, and canticles (1852), a catechism (1854), a calendar of Catholic ritual, and a number of sermons.
