= Tammy Beauvais =

First Nations fashion designer

- Born: Kahnawake, Quebec, Canada
- Education: First Nation Technical Institute
- Occupations: Fashion designer, fine artist, entrepreneur
- Employer(s): Self-employed by Tammy Beauvois Designs, her company since 1999
- Known for: Fashion and design
- Website: http://tammybeauvais.com/

Tammy Beauvais is a First Nations fashion designer from Kahnawake Mohawk Territory in Quebec, Canada. She left Kahnawake in 1990 following the Oka Crisis. In 1999, Beauvais launched Tammy Beauvais Designs a North American Indigenous Fashion company which produces contemporary, authentically Indigenous made clothing that honors Indigenous spirituality and traditions.

== Career ==
Beauvais has been designing since she was 13 years of age. Her company, Tammy Beauvais Designs, was founded in 1999 and designs contemporary and traditional indigenous clothing for both celebrations and everyday use. Their products include clothing and accessories such as wedding apparels, Pow-wow-opoly board game, apparel and sunglasses.

Her work resides in the collections of the McCord Museum, Heard Museum and the Budeskunsthalle Museum.

A beaded cape created by Beauvais was gifted to Michelle Obama by the Canadian government. The cape gifted to Obama includes three glass beads, which were heirlooms belonging to Beauvais's family, one in each beaded flower. In 2011, Beauvais created a new scarf for graduating Aboriginal students of McGill University that will be introduced into convocation ceremonial dress. The scarves acknowledge the importance of Aboriginal students and their ties to the university. In 2012, Beauvais' work was featured in the Rendezvous Royale in Cody, Wyoming as part of the Cody High Style fashion show. In this show, her work featured motifs of wampum, turtles, and feathers.

Notable people who own or have worn Beauvais' work include Sophie Grégoire-Trudeau (winter white cape), Robert De Niro (satin Tree of Peace Native Design vest), Pierce Brosnan, Pope John Paul II (satin Katri Tekakwitha Native Design Scarf), Lorne Cardinal, Waneek Horn Miller and actor Eric Roberts. Beauvais designed the "Sky Woman Capes" for Aline Chrétien, the former First Lady of Canada, that were given to all the First Ladies of the Americas, including Laura Bush.

== Personal life ==
Beauvais was born in Kahnawake Mohawk Territory but left in 1990 after the Oka Crisis. She went to live in Manitoba with the Metis, Cree and Ojibwe people and sought healing from the armed standoff through fasting, sweat lodges and sun dance ceremonies. In 2004 she married into the Navajo Nation of Steamboat, Arizona.
