= Marion Konwanénhon Delaronde =

Kahnawakeronon director

- Education: B.F.A. Concordia University
- Known for: Tóta tánon Ohkwá:ri (TV series)

Marion Konwanénhon Delaronde (born March 23, 1977) is a Kahnawakeronon artist, animator, director and puppeteer. Delaronde is known for her children's series Tóta tánon Ohkwá:ri, a show produced at The Kanien'kehá:ka Onkwawén:na Raotitióhkwa Language and Cultural Center (KORLCC) in Kahnawake. She is also the director of the Eastern Connections Film Festival, an Indigenous community run film festival which began in 2013. She is an advocate for the revitalization of the Kanien'kéha language and uses her creative projects to help her community further develop and promote learning the language. Marion is also a scholar and holds degrees from Concordia University. Over the years she have developed a portfolio that includes animated films, books, masterclasses and workshops.

== Biography ==
Marion Konwanénhon Delaronde is a Kanien'kéha (Mohawk) artist and director from Kahnawà:ke. She created an initiative called Teioiaks in 1999, which aimed to help local youth make short films. In 2004, she graduated from the Kanien’kéha Ratiwennahní:rats program from the KORLCC, a program geared towards enhancing adults in their fluency in the Kanien'kéha Language. She has a college diploma in languages and literature and a B.F.A. in Film Animation from Concordia University. Delaronde is the producer of the T.V. show Tóta tánon Ohkwá:ri and has been running the project for over a decade. She's co-host of a radio show on 103.7 FM for second language Kanien’kéha learners, which is entirely in the Mohawk language called Tewawennakará:tats. Delaronde has worked on the animated features The Lost World(2002) and Without a Whisper: KONNON- KWE (2020). Through her work and assisted work on films, Delaronde created the Eastern Connections Film Festival in Kahnawake. Marion is currently studying at Concordia University, enrolled in the Foundations of Science Certificate Program. In August 2023, as part of the Presence Autochtone Festival, she gave a masterclass on "community production in the original language." This class was presented by The Indigenous Screen Office and was held at The National Film Board in Montreal.

== Works ==
Tóta tánon Ohkwá:ri (TV Series) - Delaronde is the art director for the children's series and also voices many of the characters in the show. She voices the main character Ohkwá:ri, a young boy who enjoys spending time with his grandmother and their adventures, they teach lessons about healthy living, cooking, and traditional practices. The show currently is in its 18th season and uses comedy, puppeteering and hand drawn elements within the show. She first began the project by applying for a job at The Kanien'kehá:ka Onkwawén:na Raotitióhkwa Language and Cultural Center as a position for an art director for the show. It was at this moment the gears began to turn and Marion found inspiration from The Muppets show. She saw the creativity in an ensemble cast of puppets and quickly began working on the main character of the show Tóta, which means grandmother in Kanien'kéha. She later began to find inspiration from people in her everyday life in Kahnawake.

The Eastern Connections Film Festival (2011–Present) - Delaronde is the director of The Eastern Connection Film Festival in Kahnawake. The festival takes place annually in Kahnawake, it has previously taken place in Kahnawake's Legion Hall. The film festival is a collaboration with The Montreal's First Peoples Festival and The Kanien'kehá:ka Onkwawén:na Raotitióhkwa Language and Cultural Center (KORLCC.) During the festival films are screened accompanied by panel discussions and presentations from invited guests in the Indigenous film industry. The festival usually runs for two days, screening films during the day and at night. Previous editions of the festival have featured artists Devery Jacobs, Kaniehtiio Horn, Sterlin Harjo, Leo Koziol, Alanis Obomsawin and more. Backyard Birds of Kahnawake (Book) - In 2022 she produced a field guide of local birds in the Kahnawake area. This field guide featured a puppet character made by Marion and a part of the Tóta tánon Ohkwá:ri series. This book is a collaboration with The Kanien’kehà:ka Onkwawén:na Raotitióhkwa Language and Cultural Center (KORLCC) and the Kahnawà:ke Environment Protection Office (KEPO). The project was also funded by the American Association for the Advancement of Science (AAAS).
