= Jean-Pierre Aulneau =

Jesuit missionary priest

Jean-Pierre Aulneau (French pronunciation: [ʒɑ̃ pjɛʁ o(l)no]; 21 April 1705 Moutiers-sur-le-Lay, Poitou, Kingdom of France – 8 June 1736 Massacre Island, Lake of the Woods, New France, now Ontario, Canada) was a Jesuit missionary priest working in New France and a pioneering linguist of the Assiniboine and Cree languages.

Aulneau was born in the province of Poitou and worked in France until 1734. Shortly after his arrival in New France following an 80-day voyage from La Rochelle and his subsequent ordination to the Roman Catholic priesthood, Fr. Aulneau was assigned as a military chaplain to the legendary Voyageur explorer Pierre Gaultier de Varennes, sieur de La Vérendrye at Fort St. Charles, on the Northwest Angle of what is now Minnesota.

Only two years after his arrival in North America, Fr. Aulneau insisted on traveling to Fort Michilimackinac, located at what is now Mackinaw City in the Lower Peninsula of Michigan, with a pre-winter resupply mission led by the commander's son, Jean Baptiste de La Vérendrye. Fr. Aulneau had hopes of a last visit to the Sacrament of Confession at Fort Michilimackinac, before accompanying a years-long westward expedition in search of both the Mandan people and an overland route to the Pacific Ocean. Instead, he and all others travelling with him were killed by a war party of the Dakota people at what is still known as Massacre Island on Lake of the Woods.

His remains were recovered during an excavation of the ruins of Fort St Charles in 1908 and, in 1961, Father Aulneau was dubbed "Minnesota's Forgotten Martyr" by Fr. Emmett A. Shanahan.

== Early life ==
Jean-Pierre Aulneau was born into the French nobility at the ancestral chateau belonging to his family near Moutiers-sur-le-Lay, Vendée, Kingdom of France. His father was hereditary Seigneur, or Lord of the manor, of La Touche. Jean Pierre studied at the Diocesan minor seminary of Luçon prior to entering the Jesuit novitiate at Pau in 1720. He spent a number of years as an instructor in La Rochelle and Poitiers. Prior to his ordination to the priesthood, he sailed for Canada New France in 1734.

His crossing on Le Ruby was stormy and, as was typical, the ship's passengers and crew shared diseases in the close quarters. A group of smugglers were also on board, and were being transported as prisoners to New France.

According to a letter by his fellow passenger Fr. Luc-François Nau, "These wretched beings would have caused the heart of a Turk to melt with pity. They were half naked and covered with sores; some were eaten alive by worms. We clubbed together and made a collection to buy them shirts from the sailors who had them to spare. All we could do did not prevent the outbreak among them of a kind of pest, which spread throughout the ship, attacking all indiscriminately, and which carried off twenty of our men at a stroke... This sickness afforded a fine field for our zeal. Father Aulneau distinguished himself by his assiduity in serving the sick."

Under orders from the General Superior of the Jesuits in New France, Fr. Pierre de Lauzon, Fr. Aulneau left Le Ruby fifteen leagues from Quebec City in New France, and completed his journey partly in a launch and partly in a birch-bark canoe. Le Ruby made the same port after eighty days at sea and one of the longest voyages from France to the New World then on record, on 12 August 1734. Father Nau wrote of Father Aunleau, however, "God preserved him in health during the passage across, for the good of the ship, but scarcely had he set foot on shore, when in turn he was stricken down and brought by two different attacks to death's door. No one could tell how he had been sick."

After recovering his health, he lodged at the Jesuit College in Quebec, preparing for his final examination, which he passed during Lent, and was ordained to the priesthood in April 1735.

== Black robe in the Northwest ==
After receiving an assignment as chaplain, the missionary (whom the Indians called the "Black Robes") set out for Fort St. Charles in June 1735.

His letters to his mother in France reveal that he was afraid of being assigned so far away from his confessor and the support of the church. He was to join the local Assiniboine and travel with them to the Mandan.

He sailed through the Great Lakes to Fort St. Charles along with Pierre Gaultier de La Vérendrye, commander of the western district. At the time, Aulneau was posted farther west than any other missionary in North America.

In a letter to fellow priest Fr. Bonin from Fort St. Charles on 30 April 1736, Fr. Aulneau related his efforts, under orders from his superiors, to compile the first ever dictionary of the Cree language. Fr. Aulneau admitted ruefully, however, "I am not very skilled at it. I have picked up but little during the winter, as all have been on a warlike expedition against the Maskoutépoels, or Prairie Sioux. They have destroyed a few lodges, and some have returned with a few scalps, which are prized as the most precious trophies of their victories. This war was the occasion for us of much suffering during the winter, as we had no other nourishment than tainted pike, boiled or dried over the fire."

== Martyrdom ==
On June 5, 1736, Fr. Aulneau, Jean Baptiste de La Vérendrye and 19 French-Canadian voyageurs were sent from Fort St. Charles to Fort Michilimackinac. They were to pick up supplies for an expedition to the Mandan people in what is today the North and South Dakota. In addition, the trip would allow Aulneau a last visit to the Sacrament of Confession before accompanying the explorers on their long journey. His letters to his family showed a young man filled with excitement about his mission to the Mandans, to whom he was eager to preach the Roman Catholic faith.

In a 1735 letter to fellow priest Fr. Bonin, Fr. Aulneau had prophetically written, "Doubtless I shall have to undergo many hardships... May God accept the sacrifice I make of my life... I can refuse him nothing... I shall deem myself happy were I deemed worthy of laying down my life for the One from Whom I received it... You may hear the news of my death. I am disposed to offer Him with a light heart the sacrifice of my life."

Within several kilometres of the fort, however, all members of the resupply expedition were killed by "Prairie Sioux" war party consisting of an estimated 90 canoes, which had travelled down the Warroad River, at Massacre Island in Lake of the Woods. The date was 8 June 1736.

The Lake of the Woods Massacre is believed to have been masterminded by Chief Sacred Born and a disaffected minority of the Minnesota Dakota people in retaliation for the Sieur de La Vérendrye's practice, like many other Frenchmen during the same era, of supplying guns to Sioux enemies, especially the Assiniboine and the Cree peoples, as part of the North American fur trade. There were very understandable reasons for this, however, as La Vérendrye had no other means to follow the orders of his King without facing financial ruin.

At the Palace of Versailles, King Louis XV and the Comte de Maurepas, the Minister of Marine, were increasingly impatient and rapidly escalating their demands for the Northwest Passage to be located without any further delays, but they invariably refused to cover any of the costs. Meanwhile, La Vérendrye's many creditors in Quebec and Montreal were threatening dire consequences if La Vérendrye did not immediately pay back his existing debts. Furthermore, according to visiting naturalist Pehr Kalm of the Royal Swedish Academy of Sciences, La Vérendrye, similarly to the Lewis and Clark Expedition of a later century, was under strict orders from the Governor of New France, the Marquis de Beauharnois, to continue exploring to the westward until reaching the Pacific Ocean.

In addition to his trading relationship and occasional military alliance with some Sioux enemies, La Vérendrye is also strongly suspected by some historians of having covertly encouraged the Assiniboine and Cree Iron Confederacy into the poaching of North American beaver skins from much further south in Minnesota, especially during the seasonal western migration of the local Dakota people to hunt the American bison in the Great Plains. La Vérendrye, who had then shipped the valuable beaver skins east in order to cover his debts and expenses, later wrote, however, that the loss of his son, his chaplain, and the 19 Voyageurs in what is now called the Lake of the Woods massacre was the greatest grief of his entire life and one from which he never completely healed.

When the Cree people reported the massacre to La Verendrye, he wrote in a 17 September 1736 diary entry, "I dispatched the Sergeant with six men to raise the bodies of Reverend Father Aulneau and my son and on the eighteenth I had them buried in the chapel together with the heads of all the Frenchmen killed, they also brought in accordance with my orders."

The bodies of Fr. Aulneau and young La Verendrye were encased in a rough hewn coffin and buried beneath the altar of the fortress chapel. Fr. Aulneau's rosary was laid at his feet. The severed heads of the 19 voyageurs were buried together in a nearby trench.

For the time being, the massacre ended plans for an immediate expedition to the Mandan and the other peoples of the Great Plains. The Assiniboine and Cree Iron Confederacy also assembled at Fort St. Charles and demanded that La Vérendrye lead them immediately in a war party to avenge the murder of his son, who had been adopted into a Cree family. La Vérendrye refused to do this, however, without first asking for and receiving permission from Versailles. The French commander also considered it suicidal to lead a war party so late in the year, as a bountiful wild rice harvest would be desperately needed to survive the coming winter without supplies from Fort Michilimackinac.

A trade embargo was instead decreed by the King against the Dakota people, resulting the temporary closure of all fur trading posts. After several years of receiving supplies only from coureurs des bois, who continued trading with the Dakota in defiance of the French Crown, Chief Sacred Born sued for peace. His decision was made following a massive retaliatory raid by the Iron Confederacy against the Prairie Dakota during their annual bison hunting migration. The raid had been led by La Vérendrye, who by now had permission in advance from King Louis XV and his Ministers. Chief Sacred Born's apology was accepted without further incident and the fur trade in Dakota land was resumed.

It was not until 1741, however, that another Catholic priest, Fr. Claude-Godefroy Coquart, began his journey west to join La Vérendrye. Fr. Coquart spent some time at Fort St. Charles before moving on to Fort La Reine (presently Portage la Prairie, Manitoba) in 1743. Fr. Coquart is the first recorded Roman Catholic priest to visit present-day Manitoba and the first to travel both North and West of Lake of the Woods.

== Veneration ==
The Catholic Church considers Aulneau a martyr in the effort to convert the Native peoples to Christianity.

The letters of Aulneau to his family, which had almost miraculously survived the 1793 Vendée Uprising, were shared with the Jesuit Order by Aulneau descendants in Vendée, France in 1889. They were first published in an English translation in 1893 as The Aulneau Collection Academics at St. Boniface College in Winnipeg read The Aulneau Collection, which inspired a series of expeditions, encouraged by Archbishop Adélard Langevin, to rediscover the old sites. Fort St. Charles remained illusive, but, based on the oral tradition of local First Nations peoples, the Jesuits easily located Massacre Island, which remains, according to Fr. Emmett Shanahan, "an island at which no pagan Indian will as much as look and who, should he have to pass it, will without fail cast upon the waters a handful of tobacco to appease the anger of the Manitou."

In 1908, a further Jesuit expedition from Saint Boniface College located Fort St. Charles, just inside the territorial waters of the United States. They excavated and examined the remains of the martyred priest and his companions. Fr. Aulneau was identified by the hook from the top of his cassock and his rosary, which had been laid at his feet. The party transferred all human remains and artifacts found at Fort St. Charles across the Canada–US border to St. Boniface College, where they were tragically lost in the November 1921 fire that destroyed the college. Whatever could be recovered was collected and reburied at the Aulneau-Vérendrye Memorial in the St. Boniface Cathedral Cemetery in Saint-Boniface, Manitoba.

To honor its Golden Anniversary in Minnesota, in 1949 the Fourth Degree Knights of Columbus in Minnesota raised money to buy the site of Fort St. Charles and build a replica of the fort and it's Catholic chapel there, which was consecrated by Bishop Francis Joseph Schenk on 5 July 1951. The property was then deeded over to the Diocese of Crookston, Minnesota, and remained, as of 1961, the site of an annual Christian pilgrimage and of a mid-July outdoor Mass in honor of Father Aulneau.

A stone statue of Fr. Aulneau, with his hands outstretched as a sign of oblation and self sacrifice, was carved by Anthony Caponi of Macalester College in St. Paul, Minnesota. As of 1961, the statue was located at the base of the tower of St. Mary, Queen of Martyrs Roman Catholic Church in Warroad, Minnesota.

== See also ==
- Canadian Martyrs
- Charles-Michel Mesaiger
