= Claude-Nicolas-Guillaume de Lorimier =

Canadian politician

Claude-Nicolas-Guillaume de Lorimier (September 4, 1744 – June 7, 1825) was an officer in the French army of Louis XV, an officer in the British Indian Department, a Member of the Parliament of Lower Canada (present day Quebec) and a fur trader and businessman. He was also known as Guillaume, Chevalier de Lorimier, Major de Lorimier, and by the Iroquois name Teiohatekon.

== Career ==
Claude-Nicolas-Guillaume de Lorimier was born in Lachine, Quebec, New France in 1744, the son of a French army officer, Le Chevalier Claude-Nicolas de Lorimier de La Rivière, Seigneur des Bordes and Marie-Louise Lepailleur de Laferté. Following in the footsteps of his father, grandfather and great-grandfather, he was commissioned as an officer in the French army of Louis XV and was serving as a junior officer when the British conquered New France. Following the conquest and brief spell in France, Lorimier returned to Quebec and joined the British army. He became one of the leading officers of the "British Indian" warriors, recruiting primarily Mohawk Iroquois Confederacy native warriors during the American Revolution and taking part in the defence of Fort St Johns (later Saint-Jean-sur-Richelieu). He was wounded during an expedition led by Major-General John Burgoyne into New York state in 1777. In 1783, he married an Iroquois woman by the name of Marie-Louise Schuyler and the couple moved to Kahnawake, where he became resident agent. Shuyler died in 1790. Claude was elected to the 1st Parliament of Lower Canada as the Member for Huntingdon in 1792. In 1793, Lorimier married Marie-Madeleine-Claire, the daughter of seigneur Joseph Brassard Deschenaux.

In 1801, Claude remarried a third time, this time to Iroquois woman and Kahnawake resident Anne Skaouennetsi (also known as McGregor or Gregory) with whom he had four children, including Antoine-George de Lorimier. Claude served as resident captain for the Iroquois forces at Caughnawaga during the War of 1812 and fought at the Battle of Châteauguay. One of his sons, Guillaume-François, was killed at the Battle of Crysler's Farm, and another, Jean-Baptiste de Lorimier, was wounded at the Battle of Beaver Dams. Lorimier was named deputy superintendent of the Embodied Indian Warriors in 1814. He died in Kahnawake in 1825.

== Descendants ==
Claude-Nicolas-Guillaume de Lorimier's son George de Lorimier (1805–1863) was also known as Antoine-George de Lorimier and George Oronhiatekha de Lorimier. He was a merchant, a wealthy land owner and a ferry operator in Kahnawake. In 1835, George married Marie-Louise Macomber/McComber. Stephen-Ambroise, attorney Albert-Emmanuel (Albert Oronhiatekha), Georges-Gervais, Joseph (Sose Ountiakase) and Jean-Baptiste (Sawakis Tahohenta) were five of their seventeen children. The first two still have many descendants in Montreal and the latter has descendants in places such as California, Delaware, Virginia. His daughter Louise has descendants in places such as France, Italy and the United Kingdom in addition to Canada and the United States. George de Lorimier lies buried under the Saint-Francis-Xavier Mission Roman Catholic church in Kahnawake, Quebec.

The first image shows Claude-Nicolas-Guillaume. The second image is a portrait of his son, Antoine-George.

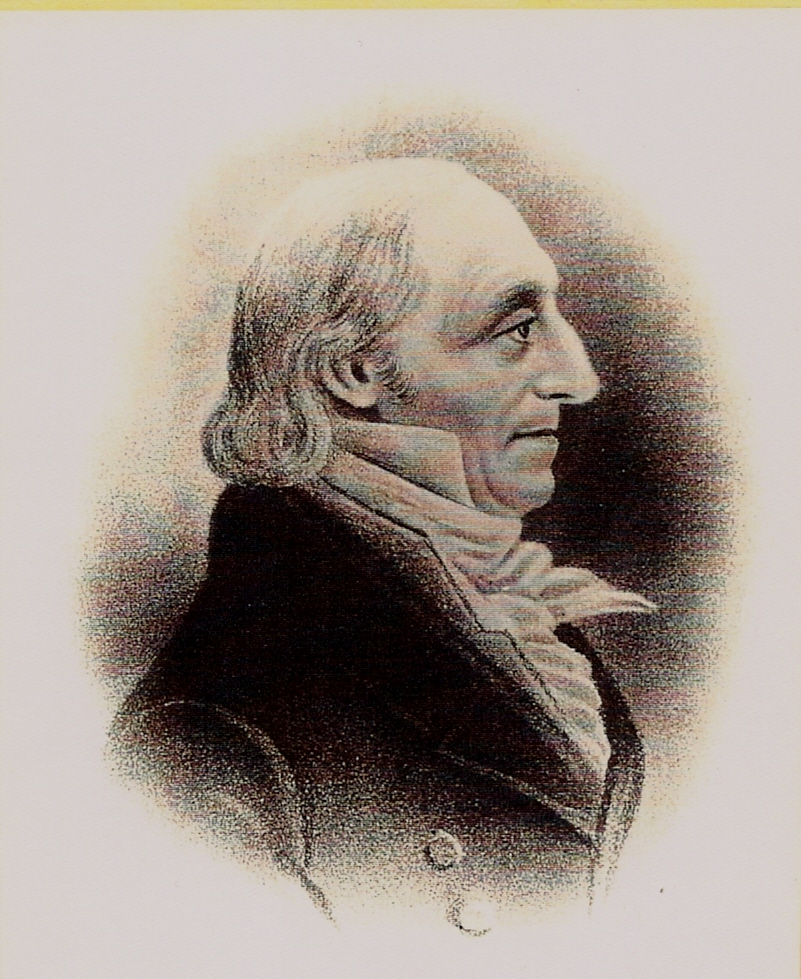

This is a picture of his son (and grandson of Claude-Nicolas-Guillaume), and Montreal attorney Albert-Emmanuel de Lorimier: http://www2.ville.montreal.qc.ca/archives/portraits/fr/fiches/P1267.shtm
