= Lake of the Woods massacre =

18th century massacre

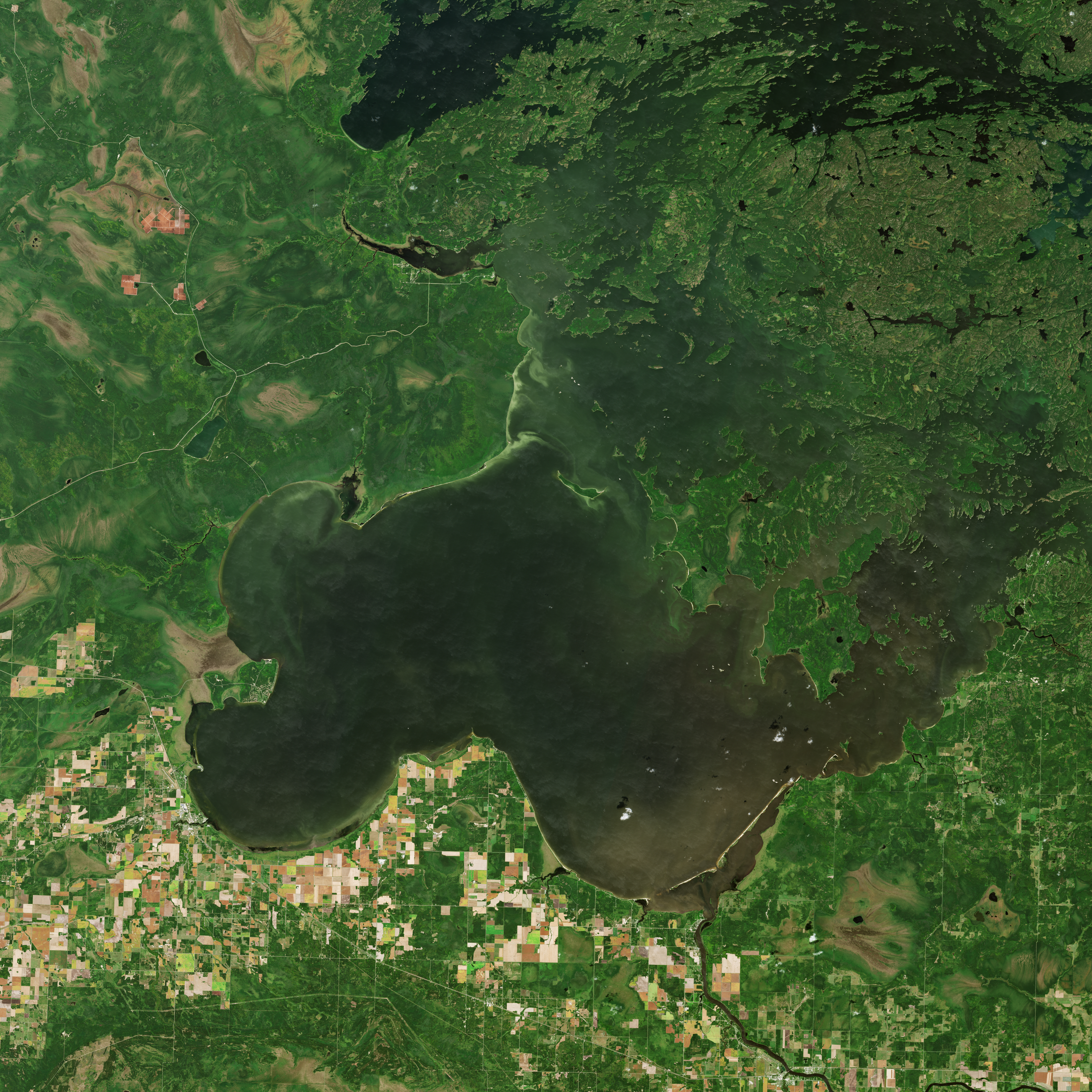
- A satellite image of Lake of the Woods
Date	6 June, 1736
Location	Lake of the Woods
Result	Sioux victory

Belligerents
Lakota and Dakota war party	French explorers

Commanders and leaders
Unknown	Jean Baptiste de La Vérendrye

Strength
About 100 warriors	21 men

On June 6, 1736, a party of twenty one French explorers led by Jean Baptiste de La Vérendrye were massacred by Lakota and Dakota warriors on an island in Lake of the Woods. The massacre came about as a result of a recent French alliance with the Cree, who, under French protection, had been attacking Lakotas. The explorers had been en route to Fort Kaminstiquia on the northern shore of Lake Superior when the group of about one hundred warriors descended on and killed them in revenge for the French-sponsored Cree raids and French slave trading.

== Background ==
=== French trade with the Sioux ===
The fur-trade in North America with New France led to much competition and conflict among indigenous nations. In the early and mid-eighteenth century, French trade had come to favor the Sioux, who received guns in return for pelts from their beaver-rich homeland, which had been relatively untouched by trade in comparison with other nations. Hoping to coax the Sioux out of an alliance with the Meskwaki (Fox), whose military power the French aimed to destroy in the Second Fox War, New France opened Fort Beauharnois among the Sioux. The Sioux, despite a newfound connection to French trade, harbored a distrust of French intentions, refusing to feed French priests and expecting traders to adopt Sioux culture and customs.

=== Cree-French alliance ===
After the Peace of Utrecht ended the War of the Spanish Succession, French desire for domination of the American interior and reaching the Mandan villages on the Missouri River prompted Governor Charles de la Boische, Marquis de Beauharnois to hire Pierre Gaultier de Varennes, sieur de La Vérendrye to develop a string of trading posts into the interior and search for a water route to the Pacific. A lack of trust towards the French among the Sioux meant that the plan required the cooperation of the Cree. La Vérendrye's attempts to broker a truce between the warring Cree and Sioux proved fruitless. Realizing he could not stop raids on the Sioux, La Vérendrye discouraged the Cree from attacking any Sioux but the more distant Lakotas, unaware of their superior numbers.

La Vérendrye armed a war party of around six hundred Cree and allied tribes in 1734, and sent his eldest son Jean-Baptiste among them, directing them not to attack Sioux. The party, against La Vérendrye's warning, proceeded to attack Lakotas and sell captives into slavery. In 1736, the prominent slave trader René Bourassa dit La Ronde, an associate of La Vérendrye, was leading an enslaved Sioux woman to Michilimackinac when a Sioux war party of around one hundred Dakota and Lakota warriors stopped him. The enslaved woman directed the war party, bent on revenge for the French-sponsored raids against the Sioux, to Lake of the Woods, which Jean-Baptiste and a party of twenty other explorers were crossing in three canoes. The Frenchmen were part of a larger hunting expedition that had run out of provisions and were proceeding to Fort Kaminstiquia.

== Massacre ==
On June 6, Jean-Baptiste de La Vérendrye's party paused its crossing of Lake of the Woods to set up camp for breakfast on a sandy island, possibly Massacre Island. At the same time, the Sioux war party, alerted to the Frenchmen's position, possibly by smoke from a French fire, approached the island from the other side and moved towards the explorers through the underbrush, taking the French by surprise and killing them all. A later account states that some of the Frenchmen attempted to swim to safety and were drowned. The explorers were scalped and mutilated, with their decapitated bodies arranged in a circle, while their heads were wrapped in beaver skins. Jean-Baptiste's back was sliced with knives and a stake plunged into his side. The bodies of the explorers were found on June 24 by a French search party. The bodies were then taken to Fort Saint-Charles and buried in its chapel.

== Aftermath ==
The killing of Jean-Baptiste de La Vérendrye would result in the French blaming the Dakota, with Pierre Gaultier de La Vérendrye declaring declaring "Rub these people out, and wipe them off the face of the Earth!" The Dakota were allies with the Ojibwe, and following French hostilities with the Dakota, and Ojibwe's alliance with the Dakota collapsed, resulting in the Dakota-Ojibwe War.
