= CKKI-FM =

Coordinates: 45°22′51.96″N 73°39′32.04″W

- Kahnawake, Quebec; Canada
- Broadcast area: Greater Montreal
- Frequency: 89.9 MHz
- Branding: 89.9 KIC Country Montreal

Programming
- Format: country

Ownership
- Owner: KKIC Radio; (Brian Moon, in his capacity as General Manager of Kahnawake Keeps It Country Station)

History
- Former frequencies: 106.7 MHz (as a pirate)
- Call sign meaning: Anagram of "Kahnawake Keeps It Country"

Technical information
- ERP: 610 watts

Links
- Webcast: Listen Live
- Website: 899kic.com

CKKI-FM (89.9 KiC Country Montreal) is a Canadian radio station in the Kahnawake Mohawk Territory, near Montreal, Quebec, which operates at 89.9 MHz FM. The station airs a country music format. Its on-air studios are located on Route 207, with production studios in Mercier.

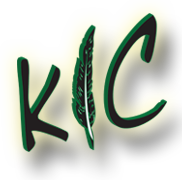
Logo from 2009 to 2024

In December 2009, the station originally operated as an unlicensed station on 106.7FM; the frequency was previously used by a local Aboriginal Voices repeater. It was granted a license to operate on 89.9 FM on September 29, 2011, by the Canadian Radio-television and Telecommunications Commission (CRTC). The station was licensed by the CRTC as a dual-language English / Mohawk station on the Sovereign Territory of Kahnawake, with 126 hours of local programming—120 hours featuring country music, and 6 hours of spoken word and talk programming, 5% in Mohawk, with the remainder in English.

On the weekend, Casey Clark's Country Countdown Ted Rupe's Country Spotlight, "Down East Country" with George Canyon, "Trucker Radio" and Cool Indy Radio are featured.

Currently, during the week Kic Country is airing all music with no live programming, until the weekend.
