= Massacre Island (Ontario) =

Island in Ontario, Canada

Coordinates: 49.2760°N 94.7704°W

Massacre Island, Ontario is a small island in Lake of the Woods, a large lake between the United States and Canada.

It is believed that this island was the site where, on June 6, 1736, a mixed group of Teton-Lakota, Dakota, and Ojibwa killed 21 Frenchmen from New France including Jesuit missionary Jean-Pierre Aulneau as well as Jean Baptiste de La Vérendrye. Fr. Aulneau has been assigned as military chaplain at Fort St. Charles, with orders to pass the summer and fall of 1736 with the Assiniboine as a prelude to joining a planned expedition West in search of the Mandan people and of the Northwest Passage. According to Catholic sources, La Vérendrye decided at the beginning of June to send a brigade east to Fort Michilimackinac for winter supplies and Fr. Aulneau insisted on accompanying the party for a last visit to the Sacrament of Confession before several years of exploring further west. When the group failed to return several search parties were dispatched. On June 22, 1736 word was received that the bodies of most of the party had been found decapitated with various other injuries including arrow wounds and knife cuts.

Today the site is marked by a large wooden cross in the middle of the island. There is some dispute whether this island was the actual site of the massacre.
