= Kahnawake =

Kahnawake Kahnawà:ke Caughnawaga
- Indian reserve
- Kahnawake First Nations Reserve No. 14
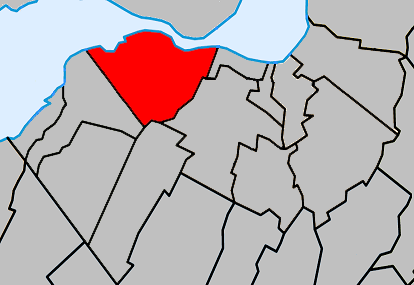
- Location of Kahnawake, outside of Roussillon RCM.

- Location in southern Quebec. Kahnawake (Quebec)
- Coordinates: 45°25′N 73°41′W
- Country: Canada
- Province: Quebec
- Region: Montérégie
- RCM: Roussillon; Within RCM, but unassociated
- Electoral Districts Federal: La Prairie—Atateken
- Provincial: Châteauguay

Government
  - Type: Band council
  - Grand Chief: Cody Diabo
  - Federal MP(s): Jacques Ramsay (LPC)
  - Quebec MNA(s): Marie-Belle Gendron (CAQ)

Area
  - Land: 50.41 km^{2} (19.46 sq mi)

Population (2022)
  - Total: 7,965
  - Pop 2006-2011: N/A
  - Dwellings: N/A
- Demonym: Kahnawakehro꞉non
- Time zone: UTC−05:00 (EST)
  - Summer (DST): UTC−04:00 (EDT)
- Postal code(s): J0L1B0
- Area code: 450
- Highways: R-132; R-138; R-207
- Website: www.kahnawake.com

The Kahnawà꞉ke Mohawk Territory (French: Territoire Mohawk de Kahnawake, pronounced [ɡahnaˈwâːɡe] in the Mohawk language) is a First Nations reserve on the south shore of the Saint Lawrence River in Quebec, Canada, across from Montreal. Established as Seigneury Sault du St-Louis by French Canadians in 1719 as a Jesuit mission, it was formerly known as Caughnawaga (after the ancestral Mohawk villages named Caughnawaga (Kahnàwa꞉ke) in the Mohawk Valley of New York). (Note: There are 17 European spelling variations of the Mohawk Kahnawake and the name Kahnawà꞉ke refers to at least three historical places in New York State, in addition to the latest one.)

Inhabited by the Mohawks of Kahnawà:ke or Kahnawakehró꞉non, Kahnawà꞉ke's territory totals an area of 48.05 km^{2} (18.55 sq mi). Its resident population numbers slightly above 8,000, with a significant number living off reserve. Its land base today is unevenly distributed due to the federal Indian Act, which governs individual land possession. It has rules that are different from those applying to Canadian non-reserve areas. Most Kahnawà꞉ke residents originally spoke Kanien'kéha, the Mohawk language, and some learned French when trading with and allied with French colonists. Together with most of four Haudenosaunee nations, including the Mohawk, they allied with the British government during the American Revolutionary War and the Lower Canada Rebellion. They have since become mostly English speaking.

Although people of European descent traditionally refer to the residents of Kahnawake as Mohawk, their autonym is Kanien’kehá꞉ka (the "People of the Flint"). Another meaning is "those who speak [the language] Kanien'kéha"). The Kanien’kehá꞉ka were historically the most easterly nation of the Haudenosaunee (Six Nations Iroquois Confederacy) and are known as the "Keepers of the Eastern Door". They controlled territory on both sides of the Mohawk River and west of the Hudson River in present-day New York, where they protected other parts of the confederacy to the west against invasion by tribes from present-day New England and the coastal areas.

Kahnawake is one of several self-governing Kanien’kehá꞉ka territories of the Mohawk Nation within the borders of Canada, including Kanesatake on the north shore of the Saint Lawrence River northwest of Montreal; Tyendinaga in Ontario; Akwesasne, which straddles the borders of Quebec, Ontario and New York across the Saint Lawrence River; and the Six Nations of the Grand River in Ontario north of Lake Erie. In the late 18th and early 19th centuries, the British considered Kahnawake one of the Seven Nations of Canada.

The name is derived from the Mohawk word kahnawà꞉ke, meaning "place of the rapids", referring to their major village Caughnawaga near the rapids of the Mohawk River in what is today central New York. When converted Catholic Mohawk moved to the Montréal area, they named the new settlement after their former one. The proximity of the Lachine Rapids also influenced their naming decision.

== History ==
=== Historical land claim ===
Sault-Saint-Louis seigneury, 1829. The surveyor (McCarty) identifies the portion of land that is claimed by the people of Kahnawake as "Morceau réclamé par les Sauvages" - portion claimed by the Indians. Also, with the words "Vraie ligne de la seigneurie Sauvage" - true boundary of the Indian Seigneury, the surveyor highlights that the original boundary of the Iroquois seigneury is situated in the Seigneury of LaPrairie.

The first Haudenosaunee settlement near Montreal was founded in 1667 on Jesuit land near La Prairie by a group of Oneida. Over the following decade, they were joined by other Haudenosaunee, particularly Mohawk refugees from the Mohawk Valley town of Ossernenon (Note: Destroyed by the French in 1667) as well as Onondaga, Wendat, and Algonquians. This predominantly Mohawk settlement became known as Kenhtà:ke. In 1675, in response to the site's swampy conditions and proximity to French alcohol traders, the inhabitants of Kenhtà:ke moved their village westward towards the Lachine Rapids, naming the new settlement Kahnawake after the Mohawk Valley village of the same name. The village was moved further west in 1690, to Kahná:wakon, and again in 1696 to a site later called Kanatakwén:ke. In 1715, the community moved for a fourth and final time to its current location, retaining the name Kahnawake.

Under what was known as the Seigneurie du Sault-Saint-Louis, a 40,320-acre (163.2 km^{2}) territory was granted in 1680 by the French Crown to the Jesuits to "protect" and "nurture" those Mohawk newly converted to Catholicism. When the seigneury was granted, the government intended the territory to be closed to European settlement, but the Jesuits, as seigneurs of the Sault, permitted French and other European colonists to settle there and collected their rents. The eastern tracts of the seigneury, originally inhabited and cleared by the Mohawk, were ultimately sold to French settlers.

The Jesuits managed the seigneury until April 1762, after the British defeated France in the Seven Years' War and took over their territory east of the Mississippi River. The new British governor, Thomas Gage, ordered the reserve to be entirely and exclusively vested in the Mohawk, under the supervision of the Indian Department.

Despite repeated complaints by the Mohawk, many government agents continued to allow non-Native encroachment, and mismanaged the lands and rents. Surveyors were found to have modified some old maps at the expense of the Kahnawake people. From the late 1880s until the 1950s, the Mohawk were required by the government to make numerous land cessions to enable construction of railway, hydro-electric, and telephone company industrial projects along the river.

As a result, Kahnawake today has only 13,000 acres (5,300 ha), one-third of the original seigneury. In the late 20th century, the Mohawk Nation was pursuing land claims with the Canadian government to regain lost land. The modern claim touches the municipalities of Saint-Constant, Sainte-Catherine, Saint-Mathieu, Delson, Candiac and Saint-Philippe. Led by the Mohawk Council of Kahnawake and the reserve's Inter-governmental Relations Team, the community has filed claims with the government of Canada. It is seeking monetary compensation NOTE: Kahnawake is not seeking financial compensation for the mismanagement of the land. Kahnawake recognizes the full extent of the 'seigneury" to be Kahnawake Mohawk Territory and is moving to reacquire its land along with financial compensation for infrastructure criscrossing the territory. and symbolic recognition of its claim.

=== Multi-cultural community ===
Kahnawake was settled by a variety of historic Indigenous peoples, although the Mohawk became by far the majority. They and other tribes had a practice of adopting captives into the tribe, often to replace people lost to illness or warfare. They generally chose to adopt young women and children taken in raids, as these were believed to be more amenable to assimilation. Individual families adopted such captives, and made them full members of their clan and tribe. The practice preceded European encounter, but later some European captives were also assimilated as Mohawk. The Mohawk had a matrilineal kinship system, with children considered born into the clan of the mother and deriving their status from her family.

There was some European settlement after the reserve land was "donated" by the French Crown in the mid-17th century. The French government stationed French colonial troops there (who formed liaisons with local women and had children by them). Shopkeepers also formed families, and through the 18th century, many marriages occurred between European men and Indian women. Multiracial children born to Mohawk mothers were readily assimilated into the mother's family, clan, and nation.

During the 17th and early 18th centuries, the English and French were competing in North America and in Europe. Together with allied First Nations or Native American tribes, they conducted raids along the undefined border between the territories of New France and New England. Captives were sometimes held for ransom, and European families and communities worked to buy them back. In some cases, families of the Indigenous communities kept captives for adoption. For instance, more than 100 captives were taken during the 1704 Raid on Deerfield; they were forced overland to Montreal and Kahnawake. The minister of Deerfield was ransomed, but his teenage daughter was kept by a Mohawk family. She ultimately married a Mohawk man and had a family with him, choosing to stay with her new family rather than return to Deerfield.

As a result of this history, many Kahnawake people have been of mixed ancestry but identify as Mohawk. Backgrounds may include ancestry of other Haudenosaunee nations, such as the Oneida, [Onondaga, Cayuga, Seneca, and Tuscarora; and/or French, English, Anglo-American, Scots, and Irish. By the 1790s and early 19th century, visitors often described the visible "great mixture of blood" at Kahnawake. They noted that many children who appeared to be of European ancestry were being brought up culturally as Mohawk. At times there has been more tension about the relations of full-blood and mixed-race members of the tribe, both in the late 19th and 20th centuries. In other areas of Canada, particularly the Red River region in the west, Métis descendants of European trappers and Indigenous women, gradually developed what has become a separate, recognized ethnic group, based on a distinct hunting and trading culture.

Charles-Gédéon Giasson & Agathe McComber

Kahnawake surnames, such as Beauvais, D'Ailleboust, de La Ronde Thibaudière, Delisle, de Lorimier, Giasson, Johnson, Mailloux, McComber, McGregor, Montour, Phillips, Rice, Stacey, Tarbell, and Williams, represent the evidence of tribal members' adoption of and intermarriage with non-Natives. Tarbell ancestors, for instance, were John and Zachary, brothers captured as young children from Groton, Massachusetts in 1707 during Queen Anne's War and taken to Canada. Adopted by Mohawk families in Kahnawake, the boys became assimilated: they were baptized as Catholic and renamed, learned the Mohawk ways and were also given Mohawk names, married women who were daughters of chiefs, reared children with them, and became chiefs themselves.

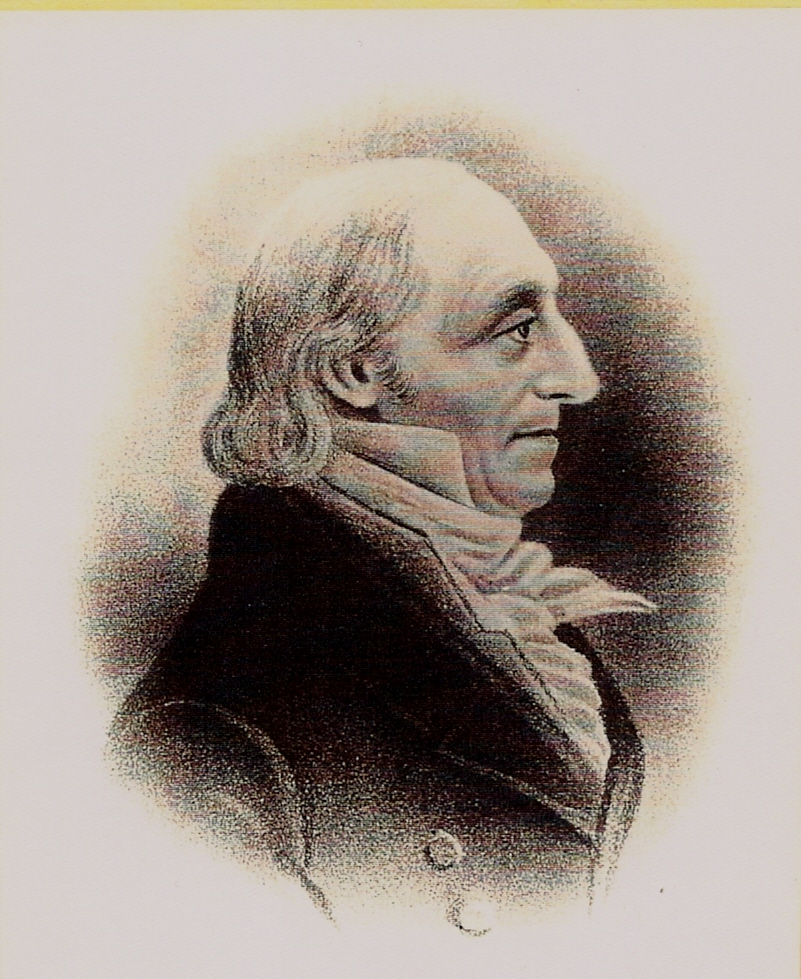
Claude-Nicolas-Guillaume de Lorimier (Major de Lorimier), sketch, c. 1810.

Historic sources document the sometimes strained relations between Mohawk and ethnic Europeans at Kahnawake, usually over property and competition for limited resources. In 1722, community residents objected to the garrison of French soldiers because they feared it would cause "horrible discord" and showed the French did not trust the locals. In the mid-1720s, the community evicted the Desaulnier sisters, traders who were garnering profits formerly earned by members of Kahnawake. In 1771, twenty-two Mohawk pressed British officials to help them prevent two local families from bringing French families to settle "on lands reserved for their common use". In 1812, many were opposed to specific types of "mixed" marriages. In 1822, Nicolas Doucet, an agent of the British Indian Department reported that the community was growing frustrated by marriages in which white husbands acquired rights over the lives and properties of their Mohawk wives according to British Canadian laws. This was in opposition to Haudenosaunee culture, which had a matrilineal kinship system, with descent and property invested in the maternal line.

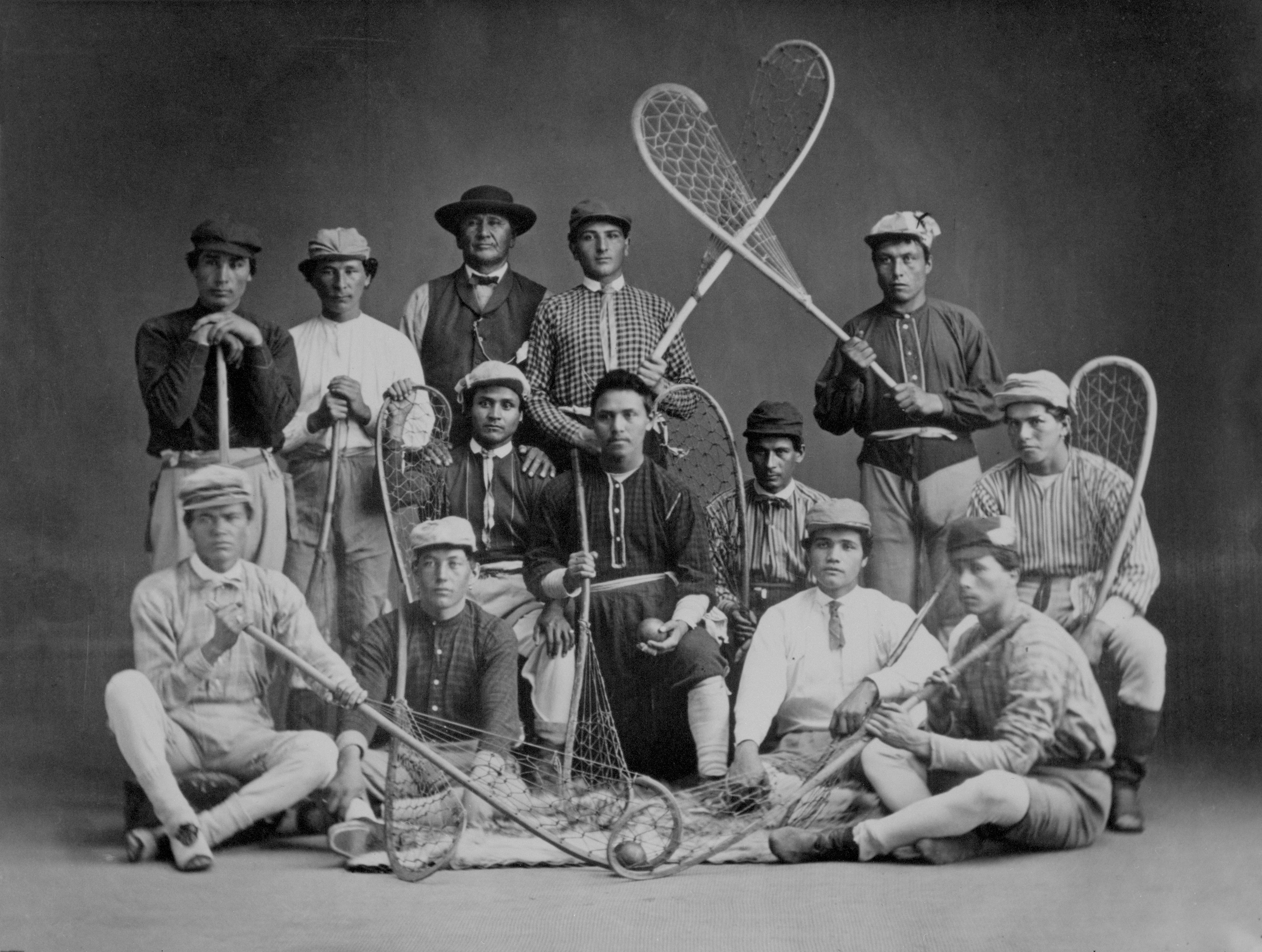
Kahnawà:ke Lacrosse Club, Montreal, QC, 1867, by William Notman

Abuse of alcohol was a continuing problem. In 1828, the village expelled white traders who were "poisoning" the Haudenosaunee "with rum and spirituous liquors". Tensions rose at the time of the 1837-38 Lower Canada Rebellion. The Mohawk had suffered incursions on their land, including non-Natives' taking valuable firewood. The Kahnawake cooperated with the British Crown against the Patriotes, largely over the issue of preserving their land and expressing their collective identity. Before and after the Rebellions, the community was fiercely divided regarding the rights of mixed-race residents, such as Antoine-Georges de Lorimier (the son of Claude-Nicolas-Guillaume de Lorimier), and whether he should be evicted. Although his mother was Mohawk and native to Kahnawake, because of his father's and his own connections to the European community, Georges de Lorimier became a controversial figure in Kahnawake, even after his death in 1863.

In the 1870s and 1880s, land and resource pressures renewed local concern about ethnic Europeans living at Kahnawake. In addition, the national government's passage of legislation, from enfranchisement to the Indian Advancement Act of 1884, which prohibited traditional chiefs and required Canadian-style elections, split the community and added to tensions. Some young Mohawk men wanted a chance to advance independently to being chiefs; other people wanted to keep the traditional, hereditary seven life chiefs selected from the seven clans.

An article on European-Mohawk conflict from the Montreal Star, 1907

The inequalities in landownership among Kahnawake residents led to resentment of the wealthy. For instance, in 1884, the multiracial sons of the late Georges de Lorimier were the largest and wealthiest landowners in the community. Some Kahnawake residents questioned whether people who were not full-blood Mohawk should be allowed to own so much land. The Mohawk Council asked members of the Giasson, Deblois, Meloche, Lafleur, Plante and de Lorimier families to leave, as all were of partial European ancestry. Some, like the de Lorimier brothers, gradually sold their properties and pursued their lives elsewhere. Others, such as Charles Gédéon Giasson, were finally given permanent status at the reserve.

Because the Indian Department did not provide adequate support to the reserve, the community continued to struggle financially. At one point, the Kahnawake chiefs suggested selling the reserve to raise money for annuities for the tribe. Social unrest increased, with young men attacking houses, barns and farm animals of people they resented. In May 1878 an arson fire killed Osias Meloche, the husband of Charlotte-Louise Giasson (daughter of Charles Gédéon Giasson, noted above), and their home and barn were destroyed. Under the Walbank Survey, the national government surveyed and subdivided the land of the reserve, allotting some plots individually to each head of household eligible to live in Kahnawake. The violence stopped as the new form of privatisation of land was instituted, but antagonism toward some community members did not.

The election of council chiefs began in 1889, but the influence of Kahnawake's shadow government of traditional clan chiefs persisted. This lasted into the 1920s, when the traditional seven-clan system became absorbed in the Longhouse Movement, which was based on three clans. This was strong through the 1940s. Since then, the elected Mohawk Council of Kahnawake (MCK) have generally established predominance in governing the reserve. This Band government is the only body with which the Canadian government recognizes.

=== 20th century ===
==== Kahnawake skywalkers ====
Mohawk success on major high-rise construction projects inspired the legend that Native American men had no fear of working at heights. Numerous Kahnawake men continued as iron and steelworkers in Canada. Thirty-three Kahnawake (Mohawk) died in the collapse of the Quebec Bridge in 1907, one of the worst construction failures of all time. The small community was devastated by the loss of so many men. They erected crosses of steel girders at both ends of the reserve to honour them.

Many Kahnawake ironworkers went to New York City to work during the first half of the 20th century. Its building boom stimulated construction of notable skyscrapers and bridges. For more than a generation, many Kahnawake men participated in building the Empire State Building, and other major skyscrapers in New York City, as well as many bridges. They brought their families with them, and most Mohawk from Kahnawake lived in Brooklyn. They called their neighbourhood "Little Caughnawaga" after their homeland. While the men worked on skyscrapers, the women created a strong community for their families. Many also worked outside the home. In the summers, the families would return to Kahnawake to stay with relatives and renew connections. Some of the people who grew up in Brooklyn as children still have the local New York accent, although they have long lived in Kahnawake.

Kahnawake high steel workers in New York were the subject of the 1966 documentary High Steel, as seen through the story of Harold McComber.

==== Vietnam War ====
Fifty men from Kahnawake volunteered to fight with the United States armed forces during the Vietnam War.

=== Present ===
==== Membership and residency on the reserve ====
With continuing late 20th-century conflicts over who could reside at the reserve, the elected chiefs of the Mohawk Council of Kahnawake (MCK) passed laws regulating membership or eligibility for residence at Kahnawake. In 1981 they passed a law that non-natives could not reside in the community; those Mohawk who marry outside of the nation lose the right to live in the homeland. The MCK said that its policy was to preserve the people's cultural identity. In the 21st century, they did not want non-Natives living at the reserve, even if a person had adopted the Mohawk language or culture.

The policy is based on a 1981 community moratorium on non-Native residency, which Kahnawake enacted into law in 1984. All couples who had a non-Mohawk partner were sent eviction notices regardless of how long they had lived on the reserve. The only exemption was for those of such couples who had married before the 1981 moratorium. Although some concerned Mohawk citizens contested the racially exclusive membership policy, the Canadian Human Rights Tribunal ruled that the Mohawk Kahnawake government may adopt policies it deems necessary to ensure the survival of its people.

In February 2010, the issue was renewed when the Mohawk Council of Kahnawake elected to evict 35 non-Natives from the reserve. While the action was legal according to the membership laws, critics believed the council was acting specifically against some individuals. These persons had lived on the reserve for 10 years or more and contributed to the community. The council said they were responding to complaints from residents about limited housing and land being occupied by non-Natives. The eviction resolution, endorsed by all 12 chiefs of the MCK, caused an uproar within and beyond the community, attracting national press attention.

Steve Bonspiel, publisher and editor of Kahnawake newspaper The Eastern Door, said that the issue dated back to 1973. At that time, when non-Native people with no ties in the community were asked to leave, they were harassed and even physically attacked. Bonspiel thought the council's 2010 threat to publish the names of people ineligible to live on the reserve was inappropriate as a means to use public pressure and potentially physical threat against them. Coverage of this issue by the Eastern Door that year resulted in the council reversing their decision.

The Federal Indian Affairs Minister Chuck Strahl said there was nothing illegal about the band's eviction of non-members:

It is important for people to realize that whether I like the decisions or not, these are decisions made by First Nations people on their own land (...) It is not for me to make those decisions, or the Government, and we are not going to be making those decisions.

— Chuck Strahl, National Post

Ellen Gabriel, the head of the Quebec Native Women's Association and a Mohawk resident at Kanesatake, criticized the MCK. She said their actions did not represent the traditional inclusiveness of Mohawk communities, which had historically assimilated adoptees and marriage partners. She criticized the council for interfering in the private lives of persons who had chosen non-Native partners. She noted the Mohawk had long been successful at integrating people within their communities, and have still preserved their language and culture over the centuries.

Some residents who received eviction notices agreed to leave; others proved they spend only limited time in the community, so were permitted as visitors. The council said it would send second notices to people who did not respond, and then would publish their names. The governing band council defended its right to ask non-Natives to leave the small community:

While the media has had a field day with this story and some have used the word 'racist,' we will, once again, state the issue isn't about anyone's feelings towards non-natives, it is simply an issue of residency and our right to determine who can and cannot live on the 13,000 acres we call home," said Mohawk Chief Michael Delisle Jr.

— Michael Delisle Jr., CBC

In September 2014, the council revived the issue of non-Native residents, announcing community meetings for discussion and plans to issue a new regulation. It barred non-Kahnawake residents from the meeting.

==== Restorative justice ====
Before European contact, the Haudenosaunee Confederacy had a long tradition of justice administered within the clan and council system. The clan would govern the behaviour of clan members, and conflict between members of clans would be settled by consensus of the council. Clan mothers as well as chiefs had roles in this system. The goal was to quickly restore peace to the community and control behaviour that threatened it. The system was based on the four principles of reason, persuasion, satisfaction and compensation, with both wrongdoer and victim as part of the process. It was intended to achieve "[d]ue compensation and condolence, and a promise of agreement" between the parties.

Many at Kahnawake and other First Nations communities believe their people are not being well served by the Canadian justice system. First Nations people are over-represented in it and in prisons. They believe this is in part due to the imposition of the Canadian justice system on traditional ways, by which the government has tried to assimilate the First Nations into European-based culture. The Canadian government has gradually favoured "indigenization" of the system. Kahnawake used section 107 of the Indian Act to nominate community members as justices of the peace, and in 1974 Justice Sharron was appointed as the first justice of the peace at the reserve. Many of the cases have dealt with traffic and parking violations, but her scope is wider, as the JP has jurisdiction over Criminal Code offences related to the following four areas: cruelty to animals, common assault, breaking and entering, and vagrancy. The Kanien’kehá꞉ka wanted further improvements.

Since 2000, Kahnawake has started to reintroduce Skenn꞉en A'onsonton (to become peaceful again), the traditional justice system of the Haudenosaunee. This system intends to create an alternative dispute resolution process, as developed by the First Nation, or "reintroduced" according to its principles. The Justice Committee of the MCK and representatives of the Longhouse jointly presented the initiative to the community. Based on wrongdoing that has taken place within the geographic area of Kahnawke, the system is intended for use before any arrest of an affected party under the Canadian system. It has procedures to be used by the victim and offender, and their supporters. With assistance by trained facilitators to resolve issues, the process is intended to restore peace and harmony, rather than to be an adversarial process. In contrast to the Canadian system of adversarial justice it,

would allow the parties to personalize the process of addressing wrongdoing and in so doing provides the parties with a "new and different choice" to resolve disputes based on traditional principles that the parties can initiate on their own without the involvement of the criminal justice system.

— Susan Haslip, The (Re)Introduction of Restorative Justice in Kahnawake: "Beyond Indigenization"

The initiative has challenges, for instance, gaining the support of Peacekeepers and community members who may not be familiar with these traditional cultural principles. But, it is an important means of re-education into principles that offer an alternative to the current Canadian system, and helps build a future especially for the young people of the community.

== Geography ==
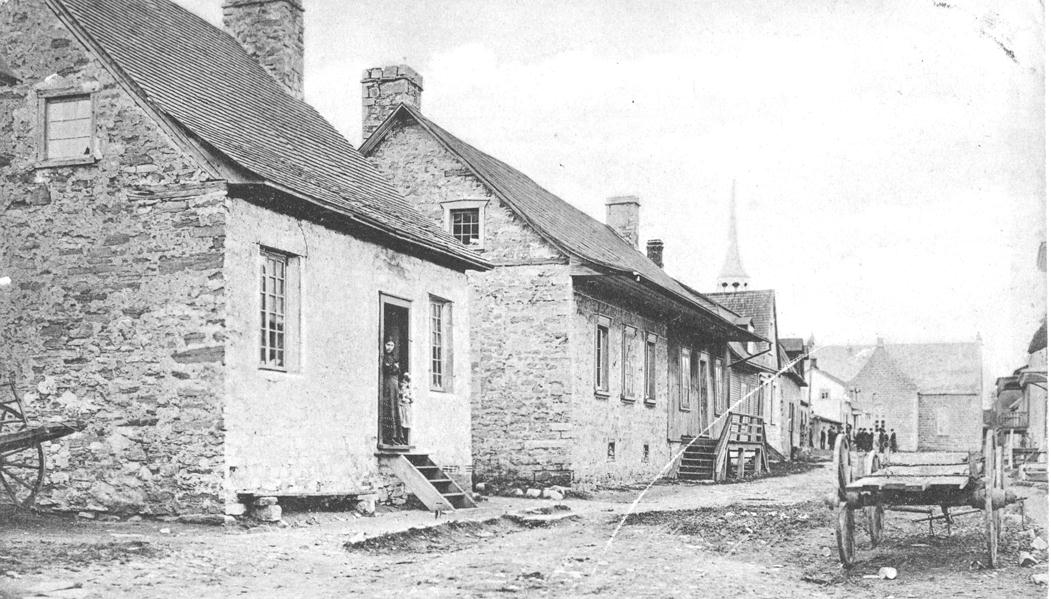
Historic photo of Kahnawake, ca. 1860

Kahnawake is located on the southwest shore where the Saint Lawrence River narrows. The territory is described in the native language as "on, or by the rapids" (of the Saint Lawrence River) (in French, it was originally called Sault du St-Louis, also related to the rapids). This term refers to their village being located along the natural rapids of the St. Lawrence. But in the mid-20th century, the path of the river was changed with construction of the Saint Lawrence Seaway canal and the people lost access to the river.

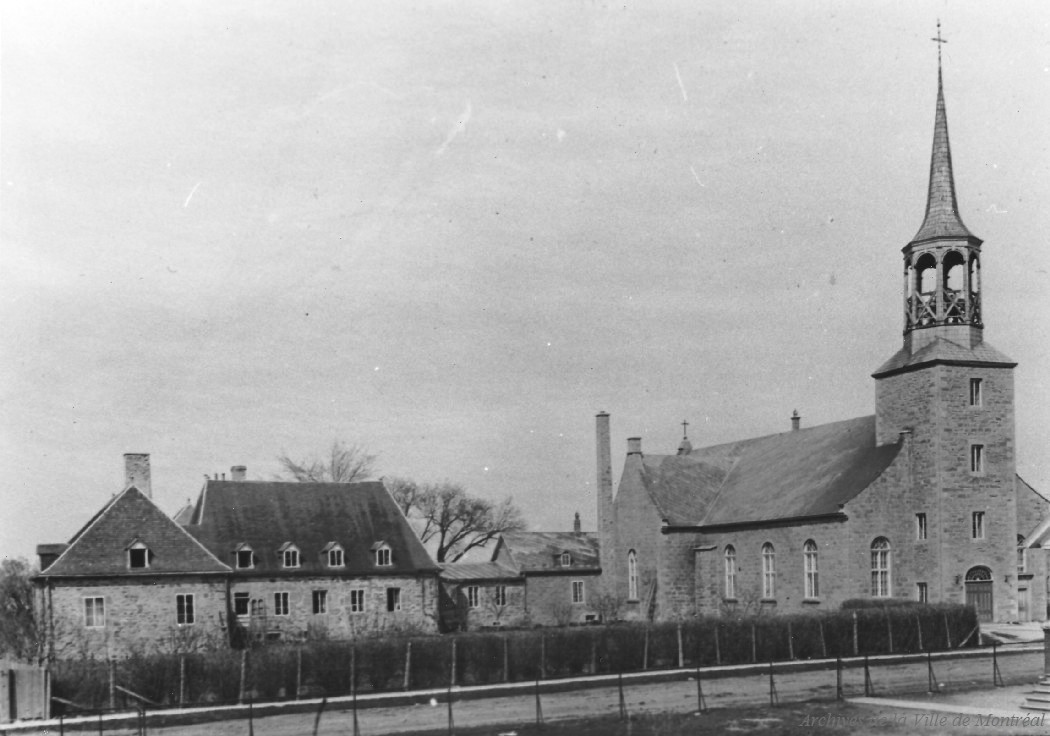
Kahnawake, Presbytery (1719) and Saint Francis Xavier mission (1845)

The French colony of New France used Kahnawake as part of a southwestern defence for Ville-Marie (later Montreal) and placed a military garrison there. The Jesuits founded a mission to administer to local Mohawk and other First Nations. This was also a base for those missionary priests who were sent to the west. Jesuit records give a settlement date of 1719.

=== Historic sites ===
Kahnawake contains three National Historic Sites of Canada: Fort St-Louis, the Jesuit Mission of St-François-Xavier, and the Caughnawaga Presbytery.

== Economy ==
The Kahnawake Gaming Commission offers licenses to Internet-based gambling sites for poker, casino, and sportsbook. It has established Kahnawake as a substantial player in that business.

Mohawk Internet Technologies (MIT), a local data centre located within the territory, hosts and manages many Internet gambling websites, and provides high-tech employment to its people. MIT is the closest and fastest source for "legally hosted" gambling websites for North American players. Established in 1998, MIT by 2006 had become a "remarkably profitable" enterprise.

== Conflicts ==
While working to strengthen their culture and language, the people of Kahnawake have generally not had the political turmoil of the nearby, smaller Kanesatake reserve.

=== Effects of construction projects in/through community ===
Historically, the federal and Quebec governments have often located large civil engineering projects benefiting the southern Quebec economy through Kahnawake because of its proximity to the Saint Lawrence River. The reserve is criss-crossed by power lines from hydroelectric plants, railways, and vehicle highways and bridges. One of the first of such projects was the fledgling Canadian Pacific Railway's Saint-Laurent Railway Bridge. The masonry work was done by Reid & Fleming, and the steel superstructure was built by the Dominion Bridge Company. In 1886 and 1887, the new bridge was built across the broad river from Kahnawake to the Island of Montreal. Kahnawake men worked as bridgemen and ironworkers hundreds of feet above the water and ground.

Kahnawake seen from Montreal

In 1955, the national government decided to pass the Saint Lawrence Seaway canal cut through the community, unilaterally expropriating 1264 acres of Mohawk territory. Despite resistance from Kahnawake and appeals to the Canadian legal system and United Nations, the people and buildings of the community were permanently separated from the natural river shore. Unable to stop the canal's construction, the Band Council attempted to ensure compensation for displaced landowners, with partial success. The loss of land and access to the river, the demolition of houses, and the change in the community's relationship to the river have had profound effects on Kahnawake, as community identity was strongly linked to the river.

=== Oka Crisis bridge blockade ===
In support of Kanesatake during its Oka Crisis in 1990, people from Kahnawake blocked the Honoré Mercier Bridge to Montreal, which had an access road through their reserve. The Kanesatake reserve had been blockaded and isolated by the Sûreté du Québec in a conflict over use of lands the Mohawk considered sacred.

The bridge blockade affected the commute of many locals throughout the summer, leading to rioting and the burning of effigies, and to a event referred to as the "Rocks at Whiskey Trench" on August 28, 1990. On that day, a convoy of 50 to 75 cars, bearing mostly women, children and elders, left Kahnawake in fear of a possible advance by the Canadian Army. While the Mohawks' cars were being searched by the provincial police force, a crowd of hundreds gathered on the Montreal side of the highway; many in the crowd threw rocks and chairs at the cars and yelled ethnic slurs. Many windows were broken and some Mohawk were hit by rocks and cut by glass. Thirteen people were arrested. Blame has fallen on the provincial government for letting the convoy pass; on the Sûreté du Québec for holding the cars for so long, and for mostly not stopping people from throwing rocks; on the lack of police or army or riot squad; and on local radio stations that broadcast the location of the convoy.

After some time, Kahnawake negotiated separately with the armed forces to remove the blockade to the bridge.

== Media ==
Kahnawake has several media outlets:

- CKKI-FM 89.9 FM known as 89.9 KiC Country Montreal
- CKRK-FM 103.7 FM branded as K1037 Kahnawake
- Mohawk Radio, an Internet-based radio station (Defunct)
- Mohawk TV/Loud Spirit Productions
- CKER The Seeker Kahnawake's first community channel (Defunct)
- Kwatokent TV, a bi-weekly informational program produced by The Mohawk Council of Kahnawake
- Iorì:wase, print and online newspaper of the Kanien’kéhá:ka Nation found at www.kahnawakenews.com
- The Eastern Door, a weekly newspaper founded in 1992 that publishes each Friday and is available online
- Mohawk TV, Kahnawake's first community TV station, broadcasting on local cable in the community.
- Mohawk Princess Pictures

== Kahnawake powwow ==
The powwow is held every summer on the second weekend of July at the Kateri Tekakwitha Island. It is a social event open to everyone to share the Native American culture such as traditional foods, hand made crafts, singing and traditional dancing.

== Schools ==
- Step By Step Child and Family Center, early learning/nursery
- Kateri School, elementary school
- Karonhianonhnha School, elementary school
- Indian Way School, elementary school
- Karihwanoron Mohawk Immersion School, elementary school with Mohawk-language immersion
- Kahnawake Learning Center, general education centre, high school
- Kahnawake Survival School, high school
- FNRAEC (First Nations Adult Education Center), Adult Education

== Representation in other media ==
- Reaghan Tarbell, a native of Kahnawake, wrote and directed a one-hour documentary, Little Caughnawaga: To Brooklyn and Back (2008), about the families from Kahnawake who migrated to work in New York. It focused on the early 20th-century community created by the women where they settled in Brooklyn, while the men worked on steel skyscrapers and bridges. It was later released in the US as A Mohawk Journey: To Brooklyn and Back (2010).
- In Tracey Deer’s drama film Beans, the 1990 Oka Crisis at Kanesatake is explored. Deer lived the crisis as a child and show it through the eyes of a preteen girl named Tekehentahkhwa (nicknamed "Beans"). Beans's perspective on life is radically changed by these events.

== Notable Kahnawakehro:non ==
- Taiaiake Alfred (born 1964), Kahnawà꞉ke Mohawk, professor and activist
- Tammy Beauvais, fashion designer
- John Kim Bell (born 1952), conductor, first Indigenous Canadian to conduct a symphony orchestra
- A. Brian Deer (1945–2019), librarian, scholar
- Beatrice Deer (Mohawk/Inuk, born 1985), singer and actress
- Esther Louise Georgette Deer, Princess White Deer (1891–1992), Kahnawá꞉ke Mohawk dancer and singer
- Tracey Deer (born 1978), two-time Gemini Award-winning filmmaker, for her documentary Club Native (2008). She also made the short Mohawk Girls. She was producer/director/writer to adapt it as a television series, Mohawk Girls, which ran on CBC for five seasons from 2014 to 2017.
- Marion Konwanénhon Delaronde (born 1977), director and puppeteer
- Don Eagle (1925–1966), 1950 American Wrestling Association champion as Chief Don Eagle.
- Mary Two-Axe Earley (Mohawk/Oneida, 1911–1996), champion of Native Women's rights, she played a major role in having Bill C-31 implemented in Canada, and received major honours.
- Karoniaktajeh Louis Hall (1918–1993), artist, writer and activist, designer of the "Mohawk Warrior Flag"
- Carla Hemlock (born 1961), quilter, beadwork artist, textile artist
- Donald "Babe" Hemlock (born 1961), woodcarver, sculptor
- Kahn-Tineta Horn (born 1940), activist, model
- Kaniehtiio Horn (born 1986), actress
- Waneek Horn-Miller (born 1975), Olympic water polo player, member of the Canadian women's water polo team, which won a Gold Medal at the 1999 Pan American Games in Winnipeg
- Kawennáhere Devery Jacobs (born 1993), actress, writer, and director
- Alwyn Morris (born 1957), Kahnawá꞉ke Mohawk Olympic canoeist and kayaker, won a gold medal in canoe/kayak for Canada at the 1984 Olympics
- Jaaji (Mohawk/Inuk), singer
- Alex Rice (born 1972), actress featured in numerous TV and film roles, including two of the Twilight films.
- Robert (Bobby) Simpson (born 1956), former professional ice hockey player who played for the Atlanta Flames
- Skawennati (born 1969), Kahnawà꞉ke Mohawk multimedia artist and curator
- Brooke Stacey (born 1996), ice hockey player
- Dexter Stacey (born 1992), NASCAR driver
- Kateri Tekakwitha (Mohawk/Algonquin, 1656–1680), born in a village in New York, but lived in Kahnawake later in life. She was canonized as the first Native American Catholic saint on October 21, 2012.
- Billy Two Rivers (1935–2023), professional wrestler, actor
- Derek White (born 1970), NASCAR driver
- Kona Williams, forensic pathologist
- Tom Wilson (born 1959), rock musician, parents were both Mohawk from Kahnawake

== See also ==
- Kahnawake Iroquois and the Rebellions of 1837–38
- List of Indian reserves in Quebec
- Pierre de Lauzon Jesuit missionary to the Kahnawake
- Raid on Deerfield as an example of frontier warfare between New France and the New England colonies
