= List of First Nations people =

This is a partial list of famous people who are members of the First Nations in Canada.

== A ==
- Aatsista-Mahkan, Blackfoot chief
- Abishabis, Cree religious leader
- A-ca-oo-mah-ca-ye, Blackfoot chief
- Evan Adams, Sliammon actor, doctor and health policy
- Mary Kawennatakie Adams, Mohawk basket maker
- Agouhanna, chief of Hochelega
- David Ahenakew, politician
- Freda Ahenakew, author
- Frederick Alexcee, Tsimshian-Iroquois woodcarver
- Jerry Alfred, musician
- Almighty Voice, fugitive
- Anahareo (Gertrude Bernard), author
- Anna Mae Aquash, Mi'kmaq activist
- Nathaniel Arcand, actor
- Jeannette Armstrong, author, artist and activist
- Arron Asham, NHL hockey player
- Shawn Atleo, chief
- Auoindaon, Wyandot chief

== B ==
- James Bartleman, diplomat and author
- Francois Beaulieu, northern prospector and guide
- Adam Beach, actor
- Big Bear, Cree chief
- Jackson Beardy, Ayisini painter
- Billy-Ray Belcourt, writer
- Perry Bellegarde, politician and leader of the Assembly of First Nations
- Rykko Bellemare, actor
- Kwena Bellemare-Boivin, actress
- Rebecca Belmore, Ojibwe conceptual artist
- Ethel Blondin-Andrew, politician
- Dempsey Bob, Tahltan-Tlingit woodcarver
- Columpa Bobb, actor, playwright and poet
- Rodney Bobiwash, scholar and activist
- Steven Bonspille, Mohawk chief
- Milton Born With A Tooth, activist
- James Bourque, activist
- Joseph Brant, Mohawk leader
- Mary Brant, Mohawk leader
- T. J. Burke, politician

== C ==
- Douglas Cardinal, architect
- Harold Cardinal, writer and political leader
- Lorne Cardinal, actor
- Tantoo Cardinal, actor
- Kate Carmack, possible finder of the gold deposits in the Yukon
- Nadine Caron, first female First Nations Canadian general surgeon
- Dawson Charlie, co-discoverer of gold in the Yukon
- Jonathan Cheechoo, ice hockey player
- Chief Lady Bird, (aka Nancy King), Chippewa and Potawatomi artist, illustrator, educator and community activist
- Byron Chief-Moon, Kainai Nation American-born actor
- Matthew Coon Come, former NationalAssembly of First Nations
- Harold Crowchild, last surviving Tsuu T'ina veteran of World War II
- Crowfoot, Blackfoot chief
- Bert Crowfoot, broadcaster and journalist

== D ==
- Brian Deer, Tionerahtoken (Mohawk) librarian from Kahnawake, laid the foundation for the Brian Deer Classification System (BDCS)
- Demasduit, one of the last Beothuk people
- Andy de Jarlis, Métis fiddler
- Paul DeVillers, politician
- Bonnie Devine, Ojibway conceptual artist
- Donnacona, chief of Stadacona site of present-day Quebec City
- Armond Duck Chief, country singer-songwriter
- Willie Dunn, filmmaker, folk musician, playwright and politician
- Jeremy Dutcher, musician
- Lillian Dyck, Canadian Senator

== E ==
- Georges Erasmus, politician
- Ron Evans, politician

== F ==
- Gary Farmer (b. 1953), Cayuga actor and filmmaker
- Jerry Fontaine, politician
- Phil Fontaine, former National Chief of the Assembly of First Nations
- Rainbow Sun Francks, Plains Cree actor

== G ==
- James Gabriel, Grand Chief of Kanesatake, Quebec
- Jonathan Genest-Jourdain, politician
- Dan George, actor and Salish chief
- Dudley George, protester killed near Camp Ipperwash
- Leela Gilday, Dene musician
- James Gladstone, Canadian Senator
- Michelle Good, writer and lawyer
- Graham Greene, Oneida actor
- Mary Greyeyes-Reid, first First Nations woman to join the Canadian Forces
- Guujaaw, Haida, carver, musician and political activist

== H ==
- John Harding (Sha ko hen the tha), chief of Kanesatake, Quebec
- Elijah Harper, politician
- Rinelle Harper, advocate for victims of violence
- Jimmy Herman, actor
- René Highway, dancer and actor
- Tomson Highway, playwright, novelist, and children's author
- Tom Hogan, Ojibway painter
- Kaniehtiio Horn, actress

== I ==
- Ilona Verley, Nlaka'pamux drag queen most known for competing in Canada's Drag Race

== J ==
- Alex Janvier, Dene Suline-Saulteaux artist
- Chief William Jeffrey, Tsimshian hereditary chief, activist and carver
- Edward John, political leader
- Mary John, Sr., leader of the Dakelh or Carrier people
- Pauline Johnson, writer and performer
- Dr. Gene Joseph, Wet'suwet'en Nadleh'dena First Nations librarian, founder of the Xwi7xwa Library
- Edith Josie, writer

== K ==
- Stephen Kakfwi, premier of the Northwest Territories
- Tina Keeper, activist, actress and politician
- Keish (Skookum Jim Mason), discovered gold in the Yukon
- Wab Kinew, musician and broadcaster, premier of Manitoba
- Chester Knight, musician

== L ==
- Melina Laboucan-Massimo, climate justice advocate
- Oscar Lathlin, politician
- George Leach, musician
- Reggie Leach, ice hockey player
- Mary Leaf, Mohawk artist specializing in basketmaking
- Ange Loft, Kanien'kehá:ka Kahnawà:ke (Mohawk) performing artist
- Tom Longboat, distance runner
- Morley Loon, musician
- Loma Lyns (Whitefish Lake Ojibway), musician

== M ==
- George Manuel, former national chief of the Assembly of First Nations
- Maquinna, chief of the Nuu-chah-nulth
- Lee Maracle, poet and author
- Leonard Marchand, politician
- Donald Marshall, Jr., wrongly convicted of murder
- Mungo Martin, Kwakwaka'wakw woodcarver
- Matonabbee, Chipewyan hunter and leader
- Matooskie (also known as Nancy McKenzie)
- Duncan McCue, journalist
- Deborah McGregor (Whitefish River Ojibway), environmentalist, educator
- Claude McKenzie, singer-songwriter
- Gerald McMaster, Siksika First Nation-Red Pheasant First Nation artist, author, curator
- Henri Membertou, Mi'kmaq leader
- Billy Merasty, actor
- Gary Merasty, politician
- Ovide Mercredi, politician
- Mattie Mitchell, Mi’kmaq Chieftain, explorer
- Gilbert Monture, honorary chief of the Mohawk tribe
- Alwyn Morris, athlete
- Norval Morrisseau, Ojibwe artist
- Daniel David Moses, poet and playwright
- Tara Lee Morin, writer
- Will Morin, politician
- Ted Moses, politician

== N ==
- Nahnebahwequa, Ojibwa spokeswoman and Christian Missionary
- Darlene Naponse, filmmaker and writer
- David Neel, Kwakwaka'wakw conceptual artist, print-maker and author
- Ellen Neel, Kwakwaka'wakw woodcarver
- Aaron Nelson-Moody, woodcarver
- Sandra Lovelace Nicholas, Canadian Senator
- Shelley Niro, New York-born Six Nations of the Grand River Mohawk artist and filmmaker
- Ted Nolan, ice hockey player and coach
- Nonosabasut, leader of the Beothuk people
- Kaúxuma Núpika, prophetess

== O ==
- Kim O'Bomsawin, filmmaker
- Alanis Obomsawin, filmmaker
- Diane Obomsawin, artist and animator
- Daphne Odjig, Odawa-Potawatomi painter
- Bernard Ominayak, elected leader of the Lubicon Lake Indian Nation
- Joseph Onasakenrat, Mohawk chief of Kanesatake, Quebec
- Oronhyatekha, first Aboriginal medical doctor
- Helen Betty Osborne, Manitoba woman, kidnapped and murdered

== P ==
- Francis Pegahmagabow, sniper, Military Medal winner
- Peter Penashue, politician
- Tahmoh Penikett, actor
- Elizabeth Phillips, Cheam elder, Halq’emeylem specialist
- Piapot, leader, diplomat, warrior, horse thief, and spiritualist
- Poundmaker (Pitikwahanapiwiyin), Cree chief
- Susan Point, Coast Salish artist
- Chief Pontiac, Odawa war leader
- Gary Potts, former chief of Temagami First Nation
- Gaylord Powless, lacrosse player
- Ross Powless, lacrosse player
- Carey Price, NHL hockey player
- Tommy Prince, war hero
- William Prince, singer-songwriter

== Q ==
- Carl Quinn, singer-songwriter

== R ==
- Bill Reid, Haida jeweler, sculptor and artist
- Sandrine Renard, newscaster on the Naked News
- Waubgeshig Rice, writer and broadcaster
- David A. Robertson, Indigenous graphic novelist and writer
- Robbie Robertson, songwriter and guitarist
- Carla Robinson, television journalist
- Eden Robinson, writer
- Eric Robinson, politician

== S ==
- Samian, musician
- Fred Sasakamoose, ice hockey player
- Gregory Scofield, writer
- Alfred Scow, Judge and Hereditary Chief
- Bev Sellars, Secwepemc writer and chief
- James Sewid, former chief councilor of the Kwakwaka'wakw
- Shanawdithit, believed to have been the last surviving member of the Beothuk people
- Crystal Shawanda, musician
- Shingoose, musician
- Jay Silverheels, Mohawk actor best known for performing as The Lone Ranger's companion Tonto
- Éléonore Sioui, Wyandot healer, teacher, and activist
- Sheldon Souray, ice hockey player
- Ralph Steinhauer, Lieutenant Governor of Alberta
- Shayla Stonechild, actress and podcaster
- Cree Summer, voice actress

== T ==
- Drew Hayden Taylor, playwright and journalist
- Gordon Tootoosis, Cree/Stoney actor best known as Albert Golo on North of 60
- Walter Patrick Twinn, Canadian Senator
- Tecumseh, military leader, War of 1812
- Jeff Thomas, photographer
- Dahti Tsetso, Dehcho environmentalist and educator
- Arielle Twist, poet
- Jaylene Tyme, drag entertainer

== V ==
- Diyet van Lieshout, musician
- Roy Henry Vickers, Tsimshian artist
- Florent Vollant, Innu singer-songwriter

== W ==
- Barbara Wardlaw, interim leader First Peoples National Party of Canada
- Frank Whitehead, politician
- Joshua Whitehead, writer
- Massey Whiteknife, businessman and musician
- David B. Williams, Ojibway painter and printmaker
- Kona Williams, forensic pathologist
- Myron Wolf Child, activist, public speaker and politician
- Sara Wolfe, nurse, midwife, and healthcare advocate

== Y ==
- Greg Younging, member of the Opsakwayak Cree Nation, editor and expert on First Nations copyright

== See also ==
- Aboriginal Canadian personalities
- List of Canadian Inuit
- List of First Nations leaders
- List of Métis people
