= Mohawks of Kanesatake =

First Nation in Canada

Mohawks of Kanehsatà:ke
- Band No. 69
- Kanehsata'kehró:non
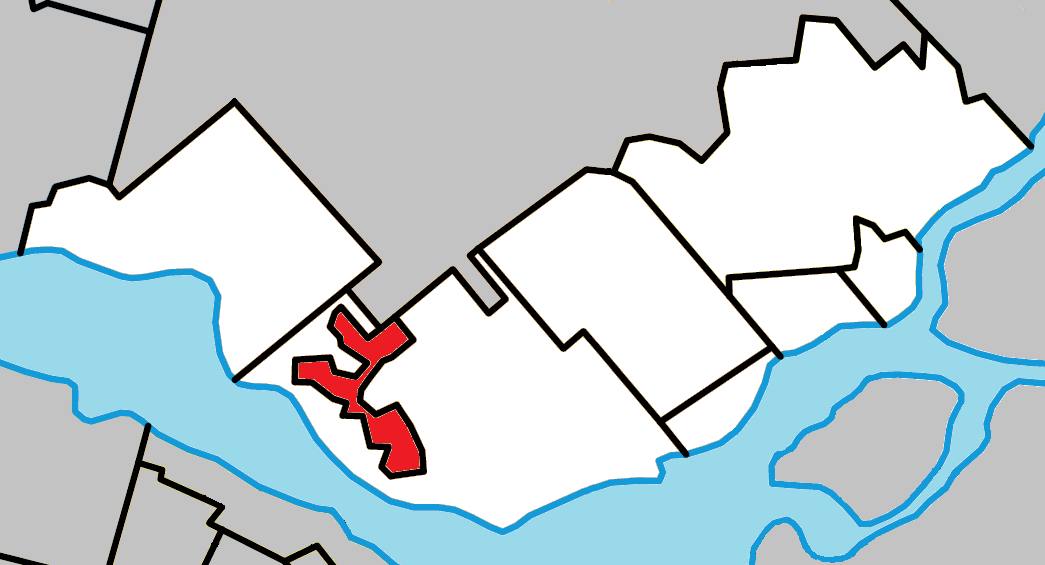
- Location of the Indian reserve of Kanehsatake
- People: Mohawk
- Headquarters: Kanesatake
- Province: Quebec

Land
- Main reserve: Kanesatake Lands
- Reserve: Doncaster 17
- Land area: 90.98 km^{2} (35.13 sq mi)

Population (2024)
- On reserve: 1347
- On other land: 24
- Off reserve: 1784
- Total population: 3155

Government
- Chief: Victor Bonspille

Mohawks of Kanehsatà:ke or Kanehsata'kehró:non are a Mohawk First Nation in Quebec, Canada. In 2016 the band has a registered population of 2,508 members. Their main reserve is Kanehsatà:ke Lands located 48 kilometres (30 mi) west of Montreal. They also share the uninhabited reserve of Doncaster 17 with the Mohawks of Kahnawá:ke for hunting and fishing.

== Demographics ==
Members of the Kanehsatà:ke First Nation are Mohawk. In November 2024, the band had a total registered population of 3,155 members, 1,784 of whom lived off reserve.

== Geography ==
44% of the Mohawks of Kanehsatà:ke live in the Indian reserve of Kanehsatà:ke Lands located 53 km west of Montreal in Quebec. The reserve covers an area of 907.7 ha. The band also shares the uninhabited reserve of Doncaster 17 located 16 km northeast of Sainte-Agathe-des-Monts with the Mohawks of Kahnawá:ke for hunting and fishing. The band is headquartered in Kanehsatà:ke. The closest important cities are Laval and Montreal.

== Governance ==
Mohawks of Kanehsatà:ke are governed by a band council elected according to a custom electoral system based on Section 11 of the Indian Act. For the 2014 to 2017 tenure, this council was composed of the chief Serge Simon and six counselors.

== Notable Kanesatakehró:non ==
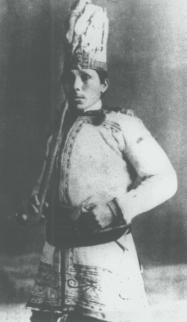
Joseph Onasakenrat, chief of the Mohawks of Kanehsatà:ke from 1868 to 1881

- Sonia Bonspille Boileau, filmmaker
- Steven Bonspille, former grand chief of Kanehsatà:ke
- Joseph Tehawehron David (1957–2004), artist
- Ellen Gabriel (born 1959), artist and activist
- James Gabriel, former grand chief of Kanehsatà:ke
- John Harding, former council chief of Kanehsatà:ke
- Joseph Onasakenrat (1845–1881), former grand chief of Kanehsatà:ke

== See also ==
- Kanehsatà:ke, Quebec
- Mohawk people
- Oka crisis
