= Myra Cree =

First Nations journalist from Quebec (1937–2005)

Myra Cree OQ
- Born: May 27, 1937; Kanesatake, Quebec
- Died: October 13, 2005 (aged 68)
- Citizenship: Mohawks of Kanesatake
- Occupations: radio and television presenter
- Organization(s): Movement for Justice and Peace at Oka-Kahnesatake
- Television: Le Téléjournal
- Spouse: Jacques Bernier
- Children: 4
- Parents: Grand Chief Ernest Cree (father); Georgiana Johnson (mother)
- Awards: National Aboriginal Achievement Award in the Media and Communications (2006) • National Order of Quebec (2010)

Myra Cree OQ (1936 — 13 October 2005) was a Canadian television presenter, radio personality, and author.

In 1975, she became the first woman and first Indigenous person to anchor Radio-Canada's Le Téléjournal. In 1990, at the height of the Oka Crisis, she founded the Movement for Justice and Peace at Oka-Kahnesatake. In 1995 Cree became a member of the National Order of Quebec.

== Early life ==
Cree was born in 1937 on the Oka-Kanesatake First Nation reserve. Her father was Grand Chief Ernest Cree, and her mother was Georgiana Johnson. Cree grew up in a trilingual household, speaking English, French, and some basic Mohawk.

== Career ==
In 1960, after working as a teacher for two years, Cree began working as a radio host at CKRS-Jonquière. She then moved to working in television at CHLT-TV in Sherbrooke, Quebec.

In 1973, Cree began working hosting at Ici Radio-Canada Télé, and in 1975 became the first woman and first Indigenous newsreader on Le Téléjournal.

== Personal life ==
Cree married lawyer Jacques Bernier in 1963. The couple had four children. In 1969, Bernier and Cree were involved in a car accident which killed Bernier. In 1970, Cree began living with then partner Solange Gagnon, a scientific journalist. In 1990, Cree came out as gay in an interview with La Presse.

== Death ==
Cree died on 13 October 2005 at the age of 68 after a battle with lung and bone cancer.
