= Kahsennenhawe Sky-Deer =

Canadian indigenous politician

Grand Chief Mohawks of Kahnawà:ke
- Incumbent
- Assumed office July 3, 2024
- Preceded by: Joe Norton

Personal details
- Born: 1979 (age 46–47) Kahnawake
- Education: University of Central Florida

Kahsennenhaw Sky-Deer is a Canadian Mohawk political figure, born in the Mohawk community of Kahnawake. On Saturday July 3, 2021, she became the first woman and the first LGBTQ+ person to be elected as the Grand Chief of the Quebec Mohawk community of Kahnawake.

== Early life and education ==
Kahsennenhawe Sky-Deer was born in 1979. After attending and graduating from Vanier College where she played flag football, she moved to attended the University of Central Florida and played for the Daytona Beach Barracuda's as a quarterback in the Professional Woman's Football League. She graduated college with a Bachelors of Arts degree in psychology from the University of Central Florida.

== Career ==
After college, she worked in a tobacco factory up until her decision to enter politics in 2009, serving as a council chief. She was then re-elected in this role in 2012 for the first time, and again in 2015 and 2018.

On July 3, 2021, she was elected as the Grand Chief of the Kahanawake Mohwak community, replacing Joe Norton, who died in 2020. She is the first LGBTQ+ and female grand chief, identifying as a lesbian. On April 26, 2023, she won the Visibility prize, awarded on Lesbian Visibility Day for her work as grand chief.

== Biography ==
Sky-Deer is known for her work as an advocate for Indigenous communities across the country, and has worked to advocate for women, youth, and 2SLGBTQ+ rights. She is particularly focused on healing within the Indigenous community from the repercussions and impacts of the injustices done, which have produced intergenerational trauma and continue to wreak havoc on Indigenous communities and their healing process.

Sky-Deer is also actively committed to addressing the disparities that Indigenous communities experience including housing and income inequalities as a direct result of the core causes of intergenerational traumas such as residential schools, the Sixties scoop, and cultural genocide.
