= James Gabriel =

James Gabriel may refer to:

- James Gabriel (politician), Canadian Mohawk politician
- James N. Gabriel (1923–1991), American lawyer and judge
- Jimmy Gabriel (1940–2021), Scottish footballer

== See also ==
- James Gabriel Huquier (1725–1805), French painter and engraver
- James Gabriel Montresor (1704–1776), British military engineer
