= Elizabeth Phillips =

Elizabeth Phillips may refer to:

- Elizabeth Phillips (martial artist) (born 1986), American mixed martial artist
- Elizabeth Phillips (Stó:lō Nation elder) (born 1939), Canadian tribal leader
- Elizabeth D. Phillips (1945–2017), American academic administrator
- Elizabeth Shannon Phillips (1911–1997), American painter, and muralist

== See also ==
- Eliza Phillips (1823–1916), English activist
