= Alien Thunder =

1974 Canadian Northern film

- Film poster
- Directed by: Claude Fournier
- Written by: George Malko
- Produced by: Marie-José Raymond
- Starring: Donald Sutherland; Gordon Tootoosis; Chief Dan George; Kevin McCarthy; Jean Duceppe
- Cinematography: Claude Fournier
- Edited by: Yves Langlois
- Music by: Georges Delerue
- Production company: Onyx Films
- Distributed by: Ambassador Film Distributors (Canada); American International Pictures (USA release); Cinerama Releasing Corporation
- Release date: 22 February 1974
- Running time: 93 minutes
- Country: Canada
- Language: English
- Budget: $1,500,000

Alien Thunder (also known as Dan Candy's Law) is a 1974 Canadian Northern film directed by Claude Fournier and starring Donald Sutherland, Gordon Tootoosis, Chief Dan George, Kevin McCarthy, and Francine Racette. Its original screenplay was written by W.O. Mitchell but Mitchell removed his name from the final release due to changes that were made.

== Synopsis ==
The movie is based on a true story from the North-West Territories in the 1890s after the North-West Rebellion. A young Woods Cree man named Almighty Voice (Gordon Tootoosis in his first film role) is arrested by the North-West Mounted Police. Reacting to comments by officer Dan Candy (played by Donald Sutherland), he breaks out of imprisonment and kills Sergeant Malcolm Grant (played by Kevin McCarthy) under desperate circumstances. Candy then spends two years hunting for Almighty Voice, but becomes disenchanted with the excessive force used by the NWMP. The film ends in a shoot-out near the town of Duck Lake, where Almighty Voice is killed.

Part of the tension of the film is the relationship between Grant and Candy. Grant shows the stereotype of the Mounties, upright and scrupulously fair, similar to portrayals of the Mounties in earlier Northerns. Candy, on the other hand, is rough-hewn and rural, not part of the idealistic vision of the Mounties. He is attracted to Grant's widow (played by Francine Racette), and also carries the guilt of having triggered Almighty Voice's decision to escape, in which Grant was killed.

Chief Dan George plays the role of Sounding Sky, the father of Almighty Voice.

== Cast ==
- Donald Sutherland as Sgt. Dan Candy
- Gordon Tootoosis as Almighty Voice
- Chief Dan George as Sounding Sky
- Kevin McCarthy as Sgt. Malcolm Grant
- Jean Duceppe as Inspector Brisebois
- Francine Racette as Emilie Grant
- Jack Creley as Arthur Ballentyne – Indian Agent
- James O'Shea as Edouard
- John Boylan as Cpl. Harold Bellringer
- Lenny George as Rolling Grass
- Ernestine Gamble as Small Face
- Vincent Daniels as Many Birds
- Sarain Stump as Napoleon Royal

== Production ==
The first version of the screenplay for Alien Thunder was written by W. O. Mitchell, a noted Saskatchewan author. However, as filming progressed and changes were made at the request of Sutherland, he asked that his name not be used on the finished version. He was reported to have said: "It's just not mine anymore."

The film was one of the most expensive produced in Canada at that time, with a cost of $1.5 million (approximately $9,245,000 in 2024). An historically accurate reproduction of the town of Duck Lake was built as one of the film sets. The Royal Canadian Mounted Police provided officers and horses for a cavalry charge in the film.

Alien Thunder was filmed in Saskatchewan at Battleford, Duck Lake, St. Isidore de Bellevue, and Saskatoon. During filming, Sutherland hired a local woman who ran a coffee shop in Bellevue to cook for him during the production, as there were few options for eating out in the small town.

Sutherland and Racette met on the filming of the movie. They married after the completion of the movie.

== Release ==
The RCMP, which had seen the film as a centrepiece of its 1973 centennial celebrations, withdrew its backing and asked that its name not be used in any promotional materials. Sutherland stated that Fournier's direction of the movie was "wretched". However, one critic noted that many of the script changes were apparently made by Sutherland, which contributed to the uneven nature of the story.

The film was originally scheduled for a premiere in Montreal in the fall of 1973. The RCMP is said to have asked that the premiere not occur during their centennial year. Instead, the film had a simultaneous release in four Saskatchewan cities in March 1974: Regina, Saskatoon, Moose Jaw, and Battleford, with a subsequent release in Vancouver.

The film was not a financial success. "Suspense is lacking and characters are generally underdeveloped, as is the tension between the Mounties and the Indians.", stated Natalie Edwards for Cinema Canada.

The film was criticised upon release. Michael Walsh, film critic for The Province in Vancouver, wrote:

Alien Thunder, one of the most costly movies ever made in this country, was a project of epic potential and lofty ambition. That the final result falls short of the mark can't help but be a disappointment. Making director Claude Fournier's shortfall all the more unhappy are the sparkles of depth and brilliance that do occur, sparkles suggesting that within the film he's offered us is a really great picture struggling to get out.

Walsh criticised Sutherland's acting in the movie, stating that Sutherland needed a stronger director to keep him on track. Walsh also criticised Sutherland's changes to the script.

A retrospective review in 2019 found that "Though it laudably uses Indigenous (and principally Cree) actors and some of the Cree language, Alien Thunder is ultimately a film about Mounties and settlers; as sympathetic as it may be to the Cree, they are, as the native peoples of the Americas tend to be in Westerns, reduced to supporting players in their own story."

The film was also released in the United States, under the name Dan Candy's Law.
