= Almighty Voice =

One Arrow Willow Cree member (1874–1897)

Almighty Voice (also known as Kitchi-Manito Waya, meaning "Voice of the Great Spirit", or Jean Baptiste) (1874–May 30, 1897), was a member of the One Arrow Willow Cree and a fugitive. He is best known for evading the North-West Mounted Police for over nineteen months, his standoff against them, and his eventual death from the fight in 1897.

== Early life ==
Almighty Voice was born in 1874, near Duck Lake, in what was then part of the North-West Territories, in the area that became the One Arrow Willow Cree Reserve. His parents were Sinookeeesick (Sounding Sky) and Natchookoneck (Spotted Calf). His grandfather was Kapeyakwaskonam (One Arrow), chief of the Willow Cree. One Arrow took part in the North-West Resistance in 1885, which was a great disruption to Almighty Voice’s childhood. For his part in the resistance, One Arrow was convicted of treason and imprisoned in Stoney Mountain Prison, Manitoba. The chief died just after his release in 1886.

As further punishment for the resistance, the Canadian government tightened restrictions on the Willow Cree, severely cutting off their Willow Cree’s rations. The government also attempted to force the Willow Cree onto the Beardy and Okemasis reserve.

== North-West Mounted Police pursuit ==
On October 22, 1895, North-West Mounted Police Sergeant Colin C. Colebrook arrested and imprisoned Almighty Voice for slaughtering a government steer that Almighty Voice contended belonged to his father. While he was in prison, one of the guards jokingly mentioned that the punishment for his crime would be a public hanging. Taking the guard at his word, Almighty Voice escaped the jail the same night. He crossed the South Saskatchewan River, and trekked the twenty miles back to his mother’s lodge. He took shelter there for a few days while the North-West Mounted Police started their search. It was only a few days after he left the Willow Cree Reserve that the police picked up his trail.

=== Death of Sergeant Colebrook ===
On October 29, 1895, Colebrook and a Métis tracker caught up to Almighty Voice near Kinistino, Saskatchewan. When Colebrook attempted to take the fugitive into custody, Almighty Voice warned that he would shoot. Despite the warning, Colebrook went ahead with his attempt, and Almighty Voice opened fire. Colebrook was killed, and Almighty Voice fled.

=== Pursuit and bounty ===
As this was now a murder investigation, the NWMP took Sounding Sky, Almighty Voice’s father, into custody to prevent him from assisting his fugitive son. Almighty Voice evaded capture for another nineteen months.

Meanwhile, the NWMP became increasingly anxious about more Indigenous revolts. They had a strong suspicion that Almighty Voice’s evasion was due to help from surrounding Indigenous groups. As a result, they placed a bounty on his head. On April 20, 1896, Secretary of State Sir Charles Tupper issued a proclamation stating that anyone who came forward with information leading to the arrest of Almighty Voice would be entitled to $500 compensation. In this proclamation, Almighty Voice was described to be about 5’10”, in his early twenties and feminine, with a scar on the left side of his face. Most of his time eluding police, Almighty Voice spent on his own reserve.

=== Death of Almighty Voice ===
On May 27, 1897, Almighty Voice, his cousin Little Saulteaux, and his brother-in-law Topean shot and killed a Métis scout near Duck Lake. A report detailing the event was handed over to the NWMP. The police force had been inundated with false reports, but upon receiving this one, verified it as accurate. They immediately set out to apprehend them. The NWMP tracked Almighty Voice and his companions into the Minichinas Hills. Upon finding the group, the police were met with gunfire. The NWMP recruited local civilian reinforcements. Together, they attempted to apprehend Almighty Voice and his companions by storm, but proved unsuccessful. The next day was filled with the exchange of gunfire, but the NWMP were still unable to apprehend the fugitives.

The following morning, May 30, 1897, the NWMP, joined by their civilian reinforcements, surrounded the bluff that served as the fugitives' hideout. They bombarded the bluff with a field artillery piece, and shortly after, recovered the bodies of Almighty Voice, Little Saulteaux, and Topean. Little Saulteaux and Topean were later found to have been dead for several days, but Almighty Voice himself had only been dead a few hours when his body was retrieved. He suffered from exposure, a double break in his leg, and a fatal gunshot wound to the head.

In total, six were killed in the gunfire: Almighty Voice, his two companions, one Métis civilian, and two policemen. Almighty Voice left behind four wives and one child, Almighty Voice Jr.

== Legacy ==
Almighty Voice is widely considered to be a hero among many Indigenous groups. His story inspired works of Indigenous art and fiction.

In 1929, Macleans published Chief Buffalo Child Long Lance’s descriptive account of Almighty Voice's story within his own life story. This publication popularized the tale.

Alien Thunder is a 1974 film based on the events in Almighty Voice's life. Almighty Voice was played by Gordon Tootoosis, a Cree actor from Saskatchewan. Donald Sutherland played a Mountie, an officer of the NWMP, who is pursuing Almighty Voice. Chief Dan George played Mighty Voice's father.

Daniel David Moses' 1991 play Almighty Voice and His Wife is an alternative history perspective on Almighty Voice's story. It prominently features his wife, who was never named in official government records, and emphasizes an imagined relationship between the two of them. Through this marital relationship, as well as their relationship to their identities, their Indigeneity, and the whiteness of the society imposed on them, the play explores themes like self-hatred and self love, and colonialism and resistance.
