= Mohawks of Kahnawà:ke =

First Nation in Canada

Mohawks of Kahnawà꞉ke
- Band No. 70
- Kahnawákeró꞉non
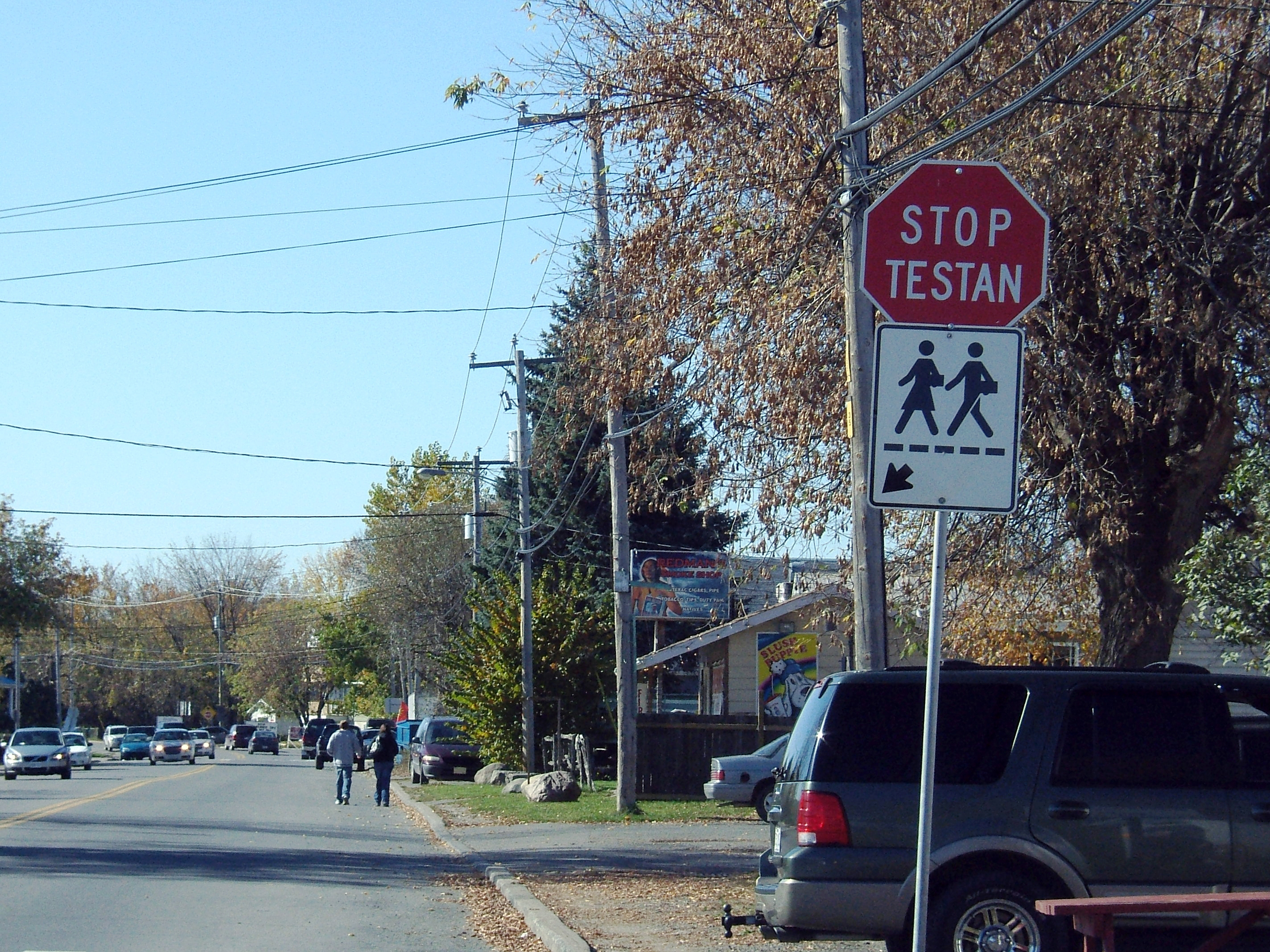
- Stop sign in Kahnawà꞉ke
- People: Mohawk
- Province: Québec

Land
- Main reserve: Kahnawà꞉ke 14
- Reserve: Doncaster 17
- Land area: 128.02 km^{2} (49.43 sq mi)

Population (2024)
- On reserve: 8122
- On other land: 30
- Off reserve: 3635
- Total population: 11787

Government
- Chief: Cody Diabo
- Council: Arnold Boyer; Iohahai꞉io Delisle; David A. Diabo; Jeffrey Diabo; Jeremiah Johnson; Stephen A. McComber; Ross Montour; Ryan Montour; Melanie Morrison; Tonya Perron; Paul Rice

Website
- kahnawake.com

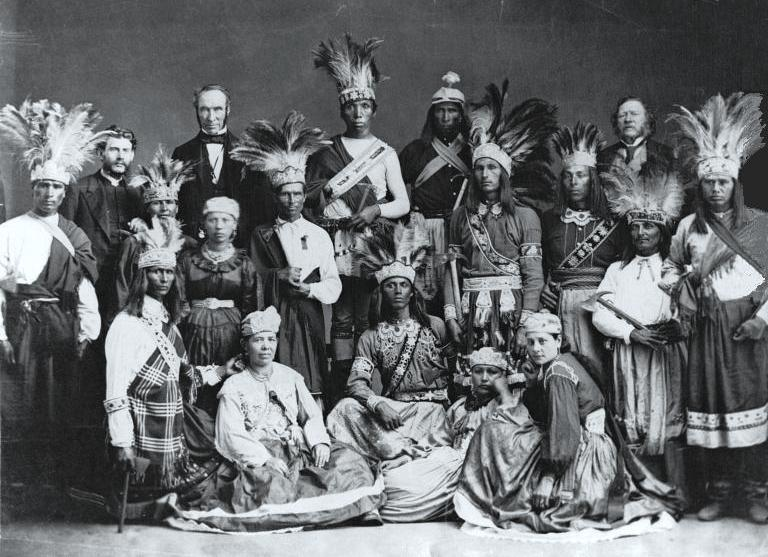
Mohawks of Kahnawà꞉ke in 1869

Mohawks of Kahnawà꞉ke (Mohawk: Kahnawákeró꞉non) are a Mohawk First Nation located in what is now Quebec, Canada. In 2024 the band had a registered population of 11,787 members. Its main reserve is Kahnawake 14, located on the south shore of the St. Lawrence River opposite Montreal. It also shares the uninhabited reserve of Doncaster 17 with the Mohawks of Kanesatake for hunting and fishing. The band is governed by the Mohawk Council of Kahnawà꞉ke.

== Demographics ==
The members of Kahnawà꞉ke First Nation are Mohawk who left the Mohawk Valley in the 1660s to return to the Northern part of Mohawk Nation territory. However, they may have been predominately assimilated captives of the Beaver Wars from the Huron and Algonquin tribes. In November 2024, the band had a total registered population of 11,787 members, 3,635 of whom lived off reserve.

== Geography ==
Kahnawake seen from Montreal

The band of Kahnawà꞉ke lives primarily on a reserve, Kahnawake 14, located 8 km southwest of Montreal, Quebec. This reserve covers an area of 4,825 ha. The band also shares an uninhabited reserve, Doncaster 17, located 16 km northeast of Sainte-Agathe-des-Monts with the Mohawks of Kanesatake for hunting and fishing. The First Nation is headquartered at Kahnawake. The closest major city is Montreal.

== Governance ==
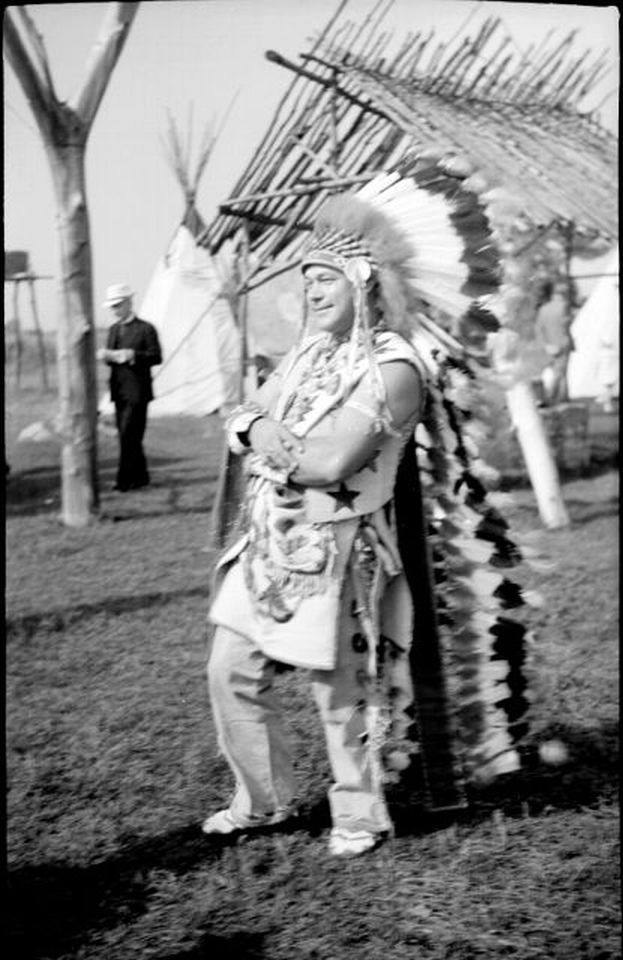
The grand chief Poking Fire in 1937

The Mohawk of Kahnawà꞉ke are governed by a band council, called Mohawk Council of Kahnawà꞉ke (Kahnawà꞉ke Tsi Ietsenhaientáhkhwa). Members are elected to three-year terms according to a custom electoral system based on Section 11 of the Indian Act.

=== Current council ===
Appointed in July 2024, for a term lasting until June 2027, the current chief and council are:

- Grand Chief: Cody Diabo
- Arnold Boyer
- Iohahai꞉io Delisle
- David A. Diabo
- Jeffrey Diabo
- Jeremiah Johnson
- Stephen A. McComber
- Ross Montour
- Ryan Montour
- Melanie Morrison
- Tonya Perron
- Paul Rice

=== Electoral history ===
==== 2018 ====
The 2018 elections were held on Saturday, 7 July (Ohiarihkó:wa).

Election for Grand Chief
Name of Candidate	Total votes Received	Notes
Joseph Tokwiro Norton	--	Acclaimed
Total	--	

Election for Council Chiefs
Name of Candidate	Total votes Received
Tonya Perron	770
Kahsennenhawe Sky-Deer	709
Mike Delisle Jr.	670
Gina Deer	589
Lloyd Phillips	556
Clinton Phillips	477
Carl Horn	456
Harry Angus Rice	395
Lindsay Leborgne	393
Rhonda Kirby	382
Ross Montour	374
William Diabo	368
Robert Patton Jr.	361
Martin Leborgne	337
Phillips Jacobs	318
Landon Meloche	304
Tonia Williams	297
Lindsay Jacobs	260
David A. Diabo	233
Louis Stacey	226
Timmy J. Montour	205
Curtis Jacobs	177
Bobbi Dee Deer	160
Dawn Melissa Montour	148

==== 2015 ====
The 2015 elections were held on Saturday, 20 June (Ohiarí꞉ha).

Election for Grand Chief
Name of Candidate	Total votes Received
Joseph Tokwiro Norton	488
Mike Delisle Jr.	397
Lloyd Phillips	356
Keith Myiow	85
Total	1326

Election for Council Chiefs
Name of Candidate	Total votes Received
Kahsennenhawe Sky-Deer	728
Carl Horn	690
Clinton Phillips	673
Kenneth McComber	667
Gina Deer	585
Martin Leborgne	571
Robert Patton Jr.	571
Christine Zachary-Deom	556
William "Billy" Diabo	548
Arlene Jacobs	539
Rhonda Kirby	511
Ross K. Montour	434
Jeffery Diabo	394
Jonn Mayo	345
Gary A. Beauvais	274
Darlene Alfred	271
Kyle Diabo	238
Dawn Melissa Montour	234
John K. Diabo	229

==== 2012 ====
The 2012 elections were held on Saturday, 7 July (Ohiarihkó꞉wa).

Election for Grand Chief
Name of Candidate	Total votes Received
Michael Ahríhron Delisle Jr.	754
Barry Alfred	612
Total	1366

Election for Council Chiefs
Name of Candidate	Total votes Received
Christine Zachary-Deom	816
Kenneth McComber	805
Carl Horn	752
Lloyd Phillips	719
Clinton Phillips	709
Martin Leborgne	668
Billy Diabo	648
Kahsennenhawe Sky-Deer	577
Rhonda Kirby	554
Bobby Patton	526
Gina Deer	509
Peter Paul	472
Mike Bush	460
Peggy Mayo-Standup	436
Jeffrey Diabo	413
Gary Beauvais	325
Kyle Diabo	257
Vernon Goodleaf	235
Keith White	203

==== 2009 ====
The 2009 elections were held on Saturday, 4 July at Kateri School.

Election for Grand Chief
Name of Candidate	Total votes Received
Michael Delisle Jr.	715
Warren Lahache	449
Total	1164

Election for Council Chiefs
Name of Candidate	Total votes Received
Ken McComber	684
Rhonda Kirby	593
Lloyd Phillips	561
Martin Leborgne	544
Kahsennenhawe Sky-Deer	495
John Dee Delormier	494
Mike Bush	487
Johnny Montour	483
Peggy Mayo-Standup	478
Carl Horn	473
Kaniatari꞉io Gilbert	421
Clinton Phillips	409
Marvin Zacharie	353
Billy Two-Rivers	349
Travis Jacobs	332
Gina Deer	329
Tiorahkwathe Gilbert	279
George Montour	256
Wilbert Standup Jr.	177
Stuart "JR" Phillips	168
Wahiakeron George Gilbert	161
Daniel Montour	134

==== 2006 ====
The 2006 elections were held on Saturday, 1 July (Ohiari'kó꞉wa).

Election for Chief
Name of Candidate	Total votes Received
Michael Ahríhron Delisle Jr.	897
Dan Kirby	233
Total	1130

Election for Council Chiefs
Name of Candidate	Total votes Received
Martin Leborgne	627
Johnny Montour	610
Warren Lahache	596
Mike Bush	514
Rhonda Lynn Kirby	508
John Dee Delormier	496
Kenneth McComber	467
Marvin Zacharie	437
Peter Paul	427
Peggy Mayo-Standup	407
Keith Myiow	383
Arlene Jacobs	365
Michael Loft	356
George Montour	341
Dennis Leborgne	338
Watio Montour	338
Lindsay LeBorgne	319
Lori Jacobs	296
Trina C. Diabo	290
Daniel Montour	287
David Dearhouse	168
Donnie D'Ailleboust	147

== See also ==
- Kahnawake
- Mohawk people
