= O. E. L. "Bud" Graves =

American painter (1897 - 1971)

O. E. L. Graves, April 6, 1958, at the El Mirador Hotel exhibition of his works in Palm Springs, CA

O. E. L. Graves (1897 - 1971) was an American artist and painter/sculptor based in Palm Springs, California during Hollywood's golden years. His client list included many of the rich and famous of his era, from movie stars (Clark Gable, Bob Hope, Bing Crosby, Janet Gaynor) to business magnates (Raymond Loewys, George R. Hearst Sr.) to shady criminal kingpins. His own personal life was just as full of high intrigue and secrecy as the famous clients he cultivated. As a result, his need to maintain a relatively low profile in his private life has relegated him to near obscurity in death as an artist.

Graves experimented constantly with new media and techniques for expressing his art. His works include delicate watercolors, fine detailed portraits, impressionistic oils, sculptures in metal, and some techniques of his own invention. Graves claims to have invented "sculpted oil painting", where multiple layers of thick oil paint are placed on masonite and then cut away to create the image. His sculpted oil paintings were displayed in some of the trendiest galleries and art museums, including the New York Metropolitan Museum of Art, which purchased some of his sculpted paintings after they had been shown there. Winthrop Rockefeller tried to purchase Grave's favorite sculpted painting from him (Ptolemy's Daughters) for a very tidy sum, only to be refused by the artist, who wouldn't part with it.

Born in London, Ontario, Canada, Graves had a strong interest in Native Americans throughout his career, which is reflected in many of his paintings. While still a youth, he became a full member of the Tsuutʼina Nation after many years of association with its people. He was also a cowpuncher, rodeo rider, and trick roper, able to throw a 100-foot circle of rope and lasso eight horses at once. He rode in the famed Calgary Stampede, displaying his cowboy skills. He had developed an interest in drawing as a boy and drew pastel sketches on sandpaper even during his cowboy days. During World War I, he was a fighter pilot with the Royal Flying Corps. After the war, he came to the United States to work as a commercial artist. During World War II, he worked as a designer of airplanes and guided missiles with North American Aviation. After World War II, Graves moved to Palm Springs, California to illustrate covers for The Palm Springs Villager magazine, a local publication in the famous celebrity town. Palm Springs then became his base of operations for a successful career as a fine artist.

After his death in 1971, court battles erupted for his estate between his wife and his mistress. During the hearings, it was discovered that O.E.L. Graves had another legal wife in Canada. In exasperation, and to recover back taxes due, the court finally awarded his remaining unsold artwork to the state of California. Immetta Davis purchased the entire collection from the state at auction. Achilles Fine Arts and Antiques in Palm Springs, owned by Jack Louis Midling, then purchased half of the works from Immetta Davis.
