= Joe Norton (politician) =

Canadian politician and Mohawk chief (1949–2020)

- Born: 29 August 1949 (age 76); Kahnawake, Quebec, Canada
- Died: 14 August 2020 (aged 70)

Joseph Tekwiro Norton (29 August 1949 – 14 August 2020) was a Canadian politician and tribe chief of the Mohawks of Kahnawá:ke.

== Biography ==
Norton was a proprietor of the internet club Absolute Poker. He was on the board of directors of TeKnoWave, Turtle Technologies, and Mohawk Internet Technologies. He was a consultant for the Federal Bridge Corporation. He had previously worked as a structural steel fitter. In 2002, he won the National Aboriginal Achievement Award.

Joe Norton died on 14 August 2020 at the age of 70.
