= Bluff (Canadian prairies) =

Term describing a clump of trees on the prairies

A bluff is a Canadian English term used on the Canadian Prairies to indicate a clump of trees on the prairies, usually poplars or willows. A bluff is naturally occurring, not cultivated.

A bluff of trees normally occurs on the flat lands. "Bluff" in this sense is different from the geographical term "bluff", meaning a cliff.
