= Tsuutʼina Nation =

First Nation in Alberta, Canada

- Band No. 432
- Tsúùtʼínà
- People: Tsuutʼina
- Treaty: Treaty 7
- Headquarters: Tsuu T'ina
- Province: Alberta

Land
- Other reserve: Tsuu T'ina 145
- Land area: 294.174 km^{2} (113.581 sq mi)

Population (2019)
- On reserve: 2089
- On other land: 1
- Off reserve: 337
- Total population: 2427

Government
- Chief: Ellery Starlight

Website
- tsuutina.com

- People: Tsúùtʼínà
- Language: Tsúùtʼínà Gūnáhà
- Country: Tsúùtʼínà Nìsk’ā; Nitawahsin'nanni (ᖹᒣᖷᑊᓱᐡ ᖻᐡᖹ)

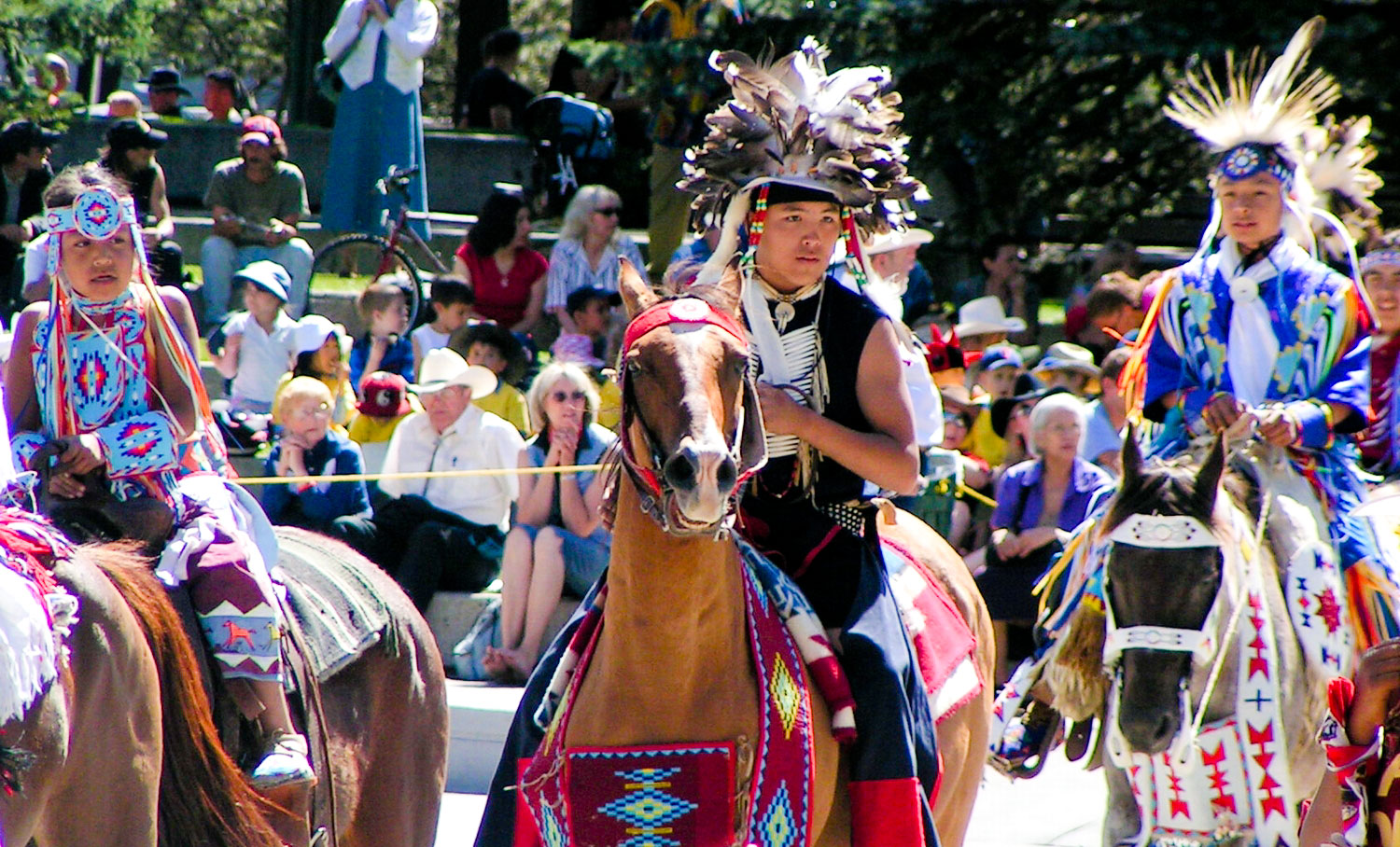
Tsuutʼina children in traditional regalia at a Stampede Parade

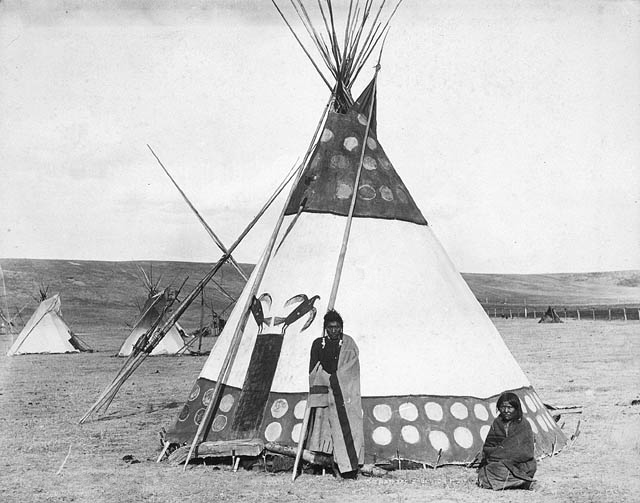
Tsuutʼina man and his wife

The Tsuutʼina Nation (Tsuutʼina: Tsúùtʾínà, lit. 'a great number of people', 'many people'; or 'beaver people'), also spelled Tsuu Tʼina or Tsu Tʼina, is a First Nation band government in Alberta, Canada. The Tsuu T'ina Nation 145 reserve is located directly west of Calgary, with its eastern edge directly adjacent to the southwest city limits. Their traditional territory spans a much larger area in southern Alberta. The land area of the current reserve is 283.14 km^{2} (109.32 sq mi), and it had a population of 1,982 in the 2001 Canadian census. The northeast portion of the reserve was used as part of CFB Calgary, a Canadian Army base, from 1910 to 1998. In 2006, the land was returned to the Nation by the Government of Canada.

The Tsuutʼina people were formerly known by the Blackfoot exonym Saahsi, typically spelled Sarcee or less frequently Sarsi. These spellings reflect the fact that the French uvular r is quite similar in pronunciation to the Blackfoot velar h. The original meaning of this term is unclear, but suggested meanings include concepts to do with being 'bold', 'hardy', 'strong-willed', or 'stubborn'. It does not appear to be related to any other modern Blackfoot word.

== History ==
The Tsuutʼina are an Athabaskan group, once part of the more northerly Dane-zaa ('Beaver Indians') nation, who migrated south onto the Great Plains during the early 18th century, before written records of the area. Tsuutʼina oral history has preserved the memory of their separation from the Dane-zaa. In turn, the Plains Apache separated from the Tsuu'tina on the Northern Plains.

The Tsuutʼina lived in tipis, and hunted along the edge of the forest in the winter months. During the summer, Tsuutʼina bands met on the open prairie to hunt bison, and participate in dances, festivals, and ceremonies. The Tsuutʼina consisted of five bands, the Big Plumes, Crow Childs, Crow Chiefs, Old Sarcees and Many Horses, and each band was led by a chief.

Explorer David Thompson said that the Tsuutʼina lived in the Beaver Hills near present-day Edmonton during the 1810s, where they cohabited with the Cree. At some point, however, they came into conflict with the Cree and moved further to the south, eventually forming an alliance with the Blackfoot.

Explorer Captain John Palliser visited the Tsuutʼina on a scientific expedition sometime between 1857 and 1860, and he estimated their population to be around 1400. Increasing contact with Europeans deeply affected the traditional Tsuutʼina way of life, primarily due the disappearance of bison on which the Tsuutʼina relied for survival. In 1877, the Tsuutʼina and various other Indigenous peoples signed Treaty 7, which resulted in the formation of reserves. These reserves offered the Tsuutʼina a means of survival following the disruption of their traditional lifestyle, and it allowed for the westward expansion of farming and European settlement. By the time the Tsuutʼina settled into their reserve in 1881, outbreaks of smallpox, scarlet fever, and inter-tribal warfare reduced their population to a mere 450. By 1924, the Tsuutʼina population fell to around 160.

The Tsuutʼina likely acquired most of their Plains Indian culture from the Blackfoot. Although in most respects the Tsuutʼina are typical Northern Plains Indians, their Tsuutʼina language is an Athabaskan language. Their language is closely related to the languages of the Dene groups of northern Canada and Alaska, and also to those of the Navajo and Apache peoples of the American Southwest, rather than the geographically nearer Blackfoot language and the Cree language, which are both Algonquian languages.

=== 21st century ===
In 2007, the Tsuutʼina opened the Grey Eagle Casino just outside Calgary city limits. The Grey Eagle complex began a major expansion, including construction of a hotel, in 2012. Both the initial construction of the casino and the expansion have been accompanied by concerns among city residents about traffic tie-ups in the area of the casino. In September 2014, Tsuutʼina Nation became one of the original eight signatories to the Buffalo Treaty.

Beginning in the late 2000s, the proximity of the Nation's territory to the city of Calgary led to disagreement over Alberta's plans to construct the southwest portion of Highway 201, a ring road. The freeway, completed in 2023, encircles the City of Calgary. The southwest portion was planned to pass through Tsuutʼina land to avoid environmentally sensitive areas. A 2009 referendum by the Nation rejected a plan to transfer reserve land to the Province of Alberta to permit construction of the southwest portion of the ring road. Some members of the Nation were upset by the rejection of the land transfer, while others viewed it as a triumph both environmentally and for the Nation. A subsequent referendum held by the Nation in 2013 approved the land transfer for the ring road, the Tsuutʼina portion of which was named Tsuutʼina Trail, even though it caused the forced removal of some residents from their traditional land by the Chief and Council. The construction disturbed 22 hectares of wetlands.

On 28 August 2020, Costco opened a store at 12905 Buffalo Run Boulevard, in the Shops at Buffalo Run development created by the Nation's development project, Taza. This store is the first Costco branch on a First Nations reserve in Canada, and as of 6 October 2020, Costco had indicated that the store had broken records.

== Notable members ==
- Harold Crowchild, last surviving World War II veteran of Tsuutʼina origin or of any Treaty 7 First Nation.
- O. E. L. "Bud" Graves, artist and painter/sculptor, became a full member of the tribe after many years of association with its people.

== Honorary chiefs ==
- W. G. Hardy, professor at the University of Alberta given the honorary title of "Chief Running Eagle" by the Tsuutʼina.

== See also ==
- Tsuutʼina language
