= Daniel David Moses =

Canadian writer (1952–2020)

Daniel David Moses (February 18, 1952 – July 13, 2020) was a Canadian poet and playwright.

Moses was born in Ohsweken, Ontario, and raised on a farm on the Six Nations of the Grand River near Brantford, Ontario, Canada. From 1979 onwards, he worked as an independent literary artist. In 2003, Moses joined the department of drama at Queen's University as an assistant professor. In 2019, he was appointed professor emeritus by Queen's University, Kingston, Canada. He died in 2020.

== Personal life ==
Moses identified as Delaware First Nations; he was not enrolled in any Indigenous nation. He was openly gay, and also claimed "brothers and sisters among Two-Spirit people." Some of his works, therefore, reflect upon and explore the complexities of Native Two-Spirit or Queer identities.

== Education ==
Moses held an Honours Bachelor of Arts from York University and a Masters in Fine Arts from the University of British Columbia.

== Career and accomplishments ==
In the mid 1970s, Daniel David Moses took a degree in literature and creative writing at York University, at a time when few Indigenous people were pursuing degrees in the arts. In 1974, while at York, he had his first poem published, a period that marks his life-long devotion to literary craft. He subsequently moved to Vancouver to pursue an MFA at UBC, where he won the creative writing department's prize for playwriting. He returned to Toronto in 1979, and while he considered himself to be an independent artist and poet, he worked at various jobs including security guard and assistant immigration officer at Pearson Airport. After 1986, he devoted all of his time to writing. It was during the mid 1980s that he immersed himself in the literary and theatrical world and met Lenore Keeshig-Tobias and Tomson Highway and co-founded the short-lived but influential "Committee to Re-Establish the Trickster". Embracing the philosophy that Indigenous artists could not know where they were going if they did not know where they came from, he began writing plays in earnest, and by the late 1980s and into the 1990s, he had already written some of his groundbreaking work, much of it produced by the Toronto based company Native Earth Performing Arts.

Accolades followed, and Moses' Coyote City, produced in 1988, was shortlisted for the Governor General's Award for Drama; this was followed by The Dreaming Beauty in 1990, winner of First Prize in Theatre Canada's National Playwriting Competition; The Moon and Dead Indians in 1994, winner of the Du Maurier One Act Playwrighting Competition; and The Indian Medicine Shows in 1996, winner of the James Buller Award for Excellence in Aboriginal Drama. His best known play, Almighty Voice and His Wife, was a reimagining of the story of Almighty Voice, a young Cree man who was killed in a shoot-out with the North-West Mounted Police in 1897. It was overlooked at the time it was produced in 1992, but has become his most beloved play, continuing to be produced across the country. An experimental work of startling audacity, it is now firmly part of the canon of great Canadian plays.

Further awards won by Moses are the Harbourfront Festival Prize and a Harold Award in 2001, and the Chalmers Arts Fellowship in 2003. In 2016 he was elected as a Fellow of the Royal Society of Canada.

A strong believer in community and in contributing to the arts, Moses served on the boards of the Association for Native Development in the Performing and Visual Arts, Native Earth Performing Arts and the Playwrights Union of Canada (now the Playwrights Guild of Canada). In addition to working as a playwright, dramaturge, editor and essayist, he held the position of the artist-playwright or writer-in-residence at various institutions, including Theatre Passe Muraille, the Banff Centre for the Arts, the Sage Hill Writing Experience, the University of British Columbia, the University of Western Ontario, the University of Windsor, the University of Toronto (Scarborough), McMaster University and Concordia University, positions that included teaching and highlighted his abiding interest in education and his belief in "passing the torch" to a younger generation of writers. He most recently became a member of the Advisory Board of Oskana Poetry and Poetics book series of the University of Regina Press.

Throughout his career, Moses continued to publish his writing widely – a body of work that includes drama, poetry, short stories and essays – in his own books and in literary journals and anthologies. These publications range from small presses, including Theytus Books' Gatherings anthology series and Exile Editions' Native Canadian Fiction and Drama (edited by Moses) to large publishers, including W.W. Norton's The Norton Anthology of Drama, Vol. 2, and OUP's An Anthology of Indigenous Literature in English: Voice from Canada, 5th Edition. In 1992, 1998, 2005 and 2013, Moses himself co-edited the seminal text, An Anthology of Canadian Native Literature for Oxford University Press.

In 2003, while still based in Toronto, Moses was appointed as a Queen's National Scholar to the Department of Drama at Queen's University in Kingston, Ontario, where he was an associate professor. Until his retirement in 2019, when he returned to Toronto, he divided his time between Kingston and Toronto and remained active in the theatrical and literary arts scene in Toronto in a career that extended over 30 years.

== Works ==
- Delicate Bodies – 1980
- The White Line – 1988
- Coyote City: A Play in Two Acts – 1990 (nominated for a Governor General's Award)
- The Dreaming Beauty – 1990 – (won 1990 Theatre Canada's National Playwrighting Competition)
- Almighty Voice and His Wife – 1992
- The Moon and Dead Indians – 1994 – (won 1994 Du Maurier One Act Playwrighting Competition)
- The Indian Medicine Shows – 1996 – (won 1996 James Buller Award for Aboriginal Theatre Excellence – Playwright of the Year)
- Big Buck City – 1998
- Hotel Centrale, Rotterdam – 2000
- Brébeuf's Ghost – 2000
- Sixteen Jesuses – 2000
- City of Shadows: Necropolite! – 2000
- Songs of Love and Medicine – 2005
- Pursued by a Bear: Talks, Monologues and Tales – 2005
- Kyotopolis – 2008
- River Range: Poems – 2009

Moses' poems have been published in international and national literary magazines, such as:

- Prism International
- ARC
- Atlanta Review
- The Fiddlehead
- Poetry Canada Review
- Impulse Magazine
- Prairie Fire
- QUARRY
- Exile, the Literary Quarterly

His poetry has also appeared or been featured in the following collections:

- Native Poetry in Canada, A Contemporary Anthology, edited by Jeanette C. Armstrong and Lally Grauer
- Native Writers and Canadian Writing, edited by W.H. New
- The Last Blewointment Anthology, Volume II, edited by Bill Bissett
- First People, First Voices, edited by Penny Petrone.

Moses was a co-editor of An Anthology of Canadian Native Literature in English with Terry Goldie.
