= Harold Crowchild =

Canadian Tsuu T'ina Nation elder

- Iron Shield
- Born: March 18, 1915
- Died: January 12, 2013 (aged 97)
- Citizenship: Tsuu T'ina Nation
- Awards: 1939-1945 Star, The France and Germany Star, The Defence Medal, The Canadian Volunteer Service Medal with Overseas Clasp, The War Medal 1939-1945

Harold Crowchild, also known as Iron Shield (March 18, 1915 – January 12, 2013) was a Canadian Tsuu T'ina Nation elder and veteran of World War II. Crowchild was the last surviving Tsuu T'ina veteran of World War II, as well as the last surviving veteran of the war from any of the Treaty 7 First Nations.

== Biography ==
Crowchild began appearing in the Calgary Stampede prior to World War II. He continued to participate in the Stampede until he was in his 80s.

In 1942, Crowchild voluntarily enlisted in the Canadian Army at the Currie Barracks in Calgary. His desire to join the armed forces was questioned by the Tsuu T'ina Chief and other tribal leaders, as there were few area members of the First Nations in the military at the time. Crowchild dismissed their criticisms, later telling the Kainai News in a 1987 interview, "We wanted to fight, what the hell."

Crowchild was a member of the 4th Canadian Armoured Division Headquarters during World War II, serving in the United Kingdom, France, the Netherlands, and Germany. He operated Sherman tanks and guarded German prisoners-of-war. Crowchild received five service medals for his service in the North West Europe Campaign, The 1939-1945 Star, The France and Germany Star, The Defence Medal, The Canadian Volunteer Service Medal with Overseas Clasp, and The War Medal 1939-1945.

Harold Crowchild died on January 12, 2013, at the age of 97. A memorial service was held at his home on the Tsuu T'ina Nation reserve followed by a traditional funeral at the Sarcee Seven Chiefs Complex. Tsuu T'ina Chief Roy Whitney called his death "a sad week for the Tsuu T'ina Nation and for Canada."
