= Abishabis =

Cree religious leader in Canada (died 1843)

Abishabis (died August 30, 1843) was a Cree religious leader. He became the prophet of a religious movement that spread among the Cree communities of northern Manitoba and Ontario during the 1840s. His preaching caused some Cree people to stop hunting furs, angering employees of the Hudson's Bay Company and reducing the company's profits. After losing much of his influence in 1843, Abishabis was suspected of murdering a First Nations family living near York Factory, in present-day Manitoba. He was arrested and imprisoned at Fort Severn, where a group of people forcibly removed him from his jail cell, murdered him and burned his body. His followers slowly disavowed his teachings and destroyed their relics from the movement or practiced their religion in secret.

The religious philosophy of his teachings was a syncretism of Christianity and traditional Cree religion. Abishabis preached that he had visited heaven and that followers could use a Cree writing system to create religious relics, the purpose of which is disputed among academics. His followers did not worship him as a deity but believed his teachings were a revelation from their god. In 1930, John Montgomery Cooper reported that stories about Abishabis were passed down by the Cree people, who claimed that Abishabis had introduced Christianity to them.

== Early life and background ==
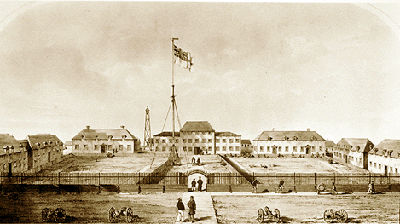
The HBC headquarters at York Factory, pictured in 1853

Abishabis (Note: 'Small Eyes', the English translation of the name, has been given in some sources as an alternate name.) was Omushkego Cree, referred to as "Home Guard Indians" by the Hudson's Bay Company (HBC). The Cree were one of several groups of Indigenous people who served as intermediaries between the HBC and Indigenous fur trappers. The company became dependent upon the Indigenous workforce to provide goods (such as fur) that they sold in Europe and to provide skilled and unskilled labour to sustain the trading posts the HBC established. Abishabis was from a district that contained York Factory, a HBC trading post. His group traded with the company since the trading post was established. An 1832 list of Cree in the York Factory area lists an unmarried man as Abesshabis, son of Secappenesew. The Omushkego Cree relied upon guns to hunt animals, and the furs from these animals were traded to the HBC. In the years preceding Abishabis's religious pursuits, the group believed something was wrong with their hunting grounds, as they struggled to hunt caribou. James Hargrave, an officer with the HBC, wrote that there was nothing remarkable about Abishabis before the arrival of Methodist missionaries to the area.

== Religious activity ==
Religious activity associated with Abishabis was first recorded in 1842. In late 1842 and early 1843, his movement spread to the Cree in the area between Fort Churchill (in what is now Manitoba) and the Moose River (in what is now Ontario). His movement would later be known as "Track to Heaven". Abishabis's movement was supported by tithes from his followers; as his following grew, he accumulated goods and more wives, a traditional sign of success among the Cree. His followers expected Abishabis to provide gifts that equaled the resources that were provided by Methodist missionaries and the HBC. Meanwhile, colonists and businessmen from Europe were concerned about Abishabis's preaching, as his followers were less likely to hunt for furs, hurting their profits. They also reported that followers relied upon wooden carvings for salvation and neglected the consumption of food or drink, causing some of them to starve to death. The HBC and the Methodist missionaries were united in refusing to recognise Abishabis's authority amongst his group. As Hargrave wrote in a letter to Governor George Simpson in September 1842, "[The head missionary] has most cordially united with me in crushing this phrenzy."

Abishabis's influence decreased in mid-1843, partially because employees of the HBC advocated against his movement. On June 8, 1843, an HBC official named George Barnston condemned Abishabis's teachings as false and manipulation from the Devil, then destroyed an artifact from the leader's group that depicted a "track to heaven" by burning it. One day after prayers, Abishabis approached Hargrave to shake his hand; the Cree considered a handshake as a ritualistic action, and Abishabis intended for this to signal the HBC's support of his group. Hargrave refused, indicating to the Cree people that the Cree leader could not obtain resources from the company. Support further weakened when Abishabis asked for more wives (some of whom were already married to other followers) and demanded larger quantities of food and clothing. Hargrave reported that by July 1843, Abishabis was begging for food and supplies to survive. As his following and influence waned, he was unable to support his wives, many of whom returned to their families.

== Arrest and death ==
In July 1843, Abishabis gathered supplies to travel to Severn House. He was accused of murdering an Indigenous family in the York Factory area and taking some of their possessions. (Note: Some sources explicitly state that Abishabis murdered these people; others state he was accused or suspected of murdering them by HBC employees. Norman Williamson reports that the dead included Abishabis's father-in-law and his family. Brown identifies the victims as Canesetu, his wife, and his two children.) Researcher Norman James Williamson stated that it was difficult to corroborate this story, as this version of events was based on information reported to Hargrave by the Cree and gossip heard by Hargrave's wife, Letitia. Abishabis arrived in Severn House several days after the killings and spent a couple of days there, bothering the population and refusing to leave. Hargrave sent an interpreter named John Cromartie to Severn House with orders to incite the Cree population to kill Abishabis by accusing him of being a wendigo. After analysing Hargrave's actions and reports, Norman Williamson stated that this order was given because Hargrave feared an uprising from the Cree against the HBC, led by Abishabis.

Cromartie disobeyed Hargrave's orders and arrested Abishabis on August 9. Norman Williamson attributes this to Cromartie's anxiety about the upcoming winter: the Cree participated in a fall goose hunt so that the HBC employees would have enough food to survive the winter. If Abishabis convinced the Cree to boycott the event, the outpost would struggle to survive. Cromartie wrote of Indigenous people's claims that Abishabis was threatening them if they did not give him resources. Abishabis was questioned about the murders in York Factory by Cromartie and denied involvement. Cromartie allowed Abishabis to escape, believing he would leave the area. Abishabis did leave for a time, but he returned shortly afterwards and was arrested again on August 28. On August 30, three men took him from his cell and killed him with axe-blows to the head. Letitia, in a letter to her mother, reported that the man who struck the final blow was named Towers. The men brought Abishabis's body to a nearby island and burned it, declaring that he might have been a wendigo and that they wanted to prevent him from haunting them.

== Religious views ==
It is difficult to establish Abishabis's religious beliefs before his preaching because the Cree were not forthcoming about their beliefs when speaking to Europeans. The ultimate goal in the Cree religion was to journey to the afterlife, located in the remote west. This differed from the Christian concept of heaven as a place in the sky for morally good people, and thus the Cree struggled to understand the Christian concept when it was explained to them by missionaries.

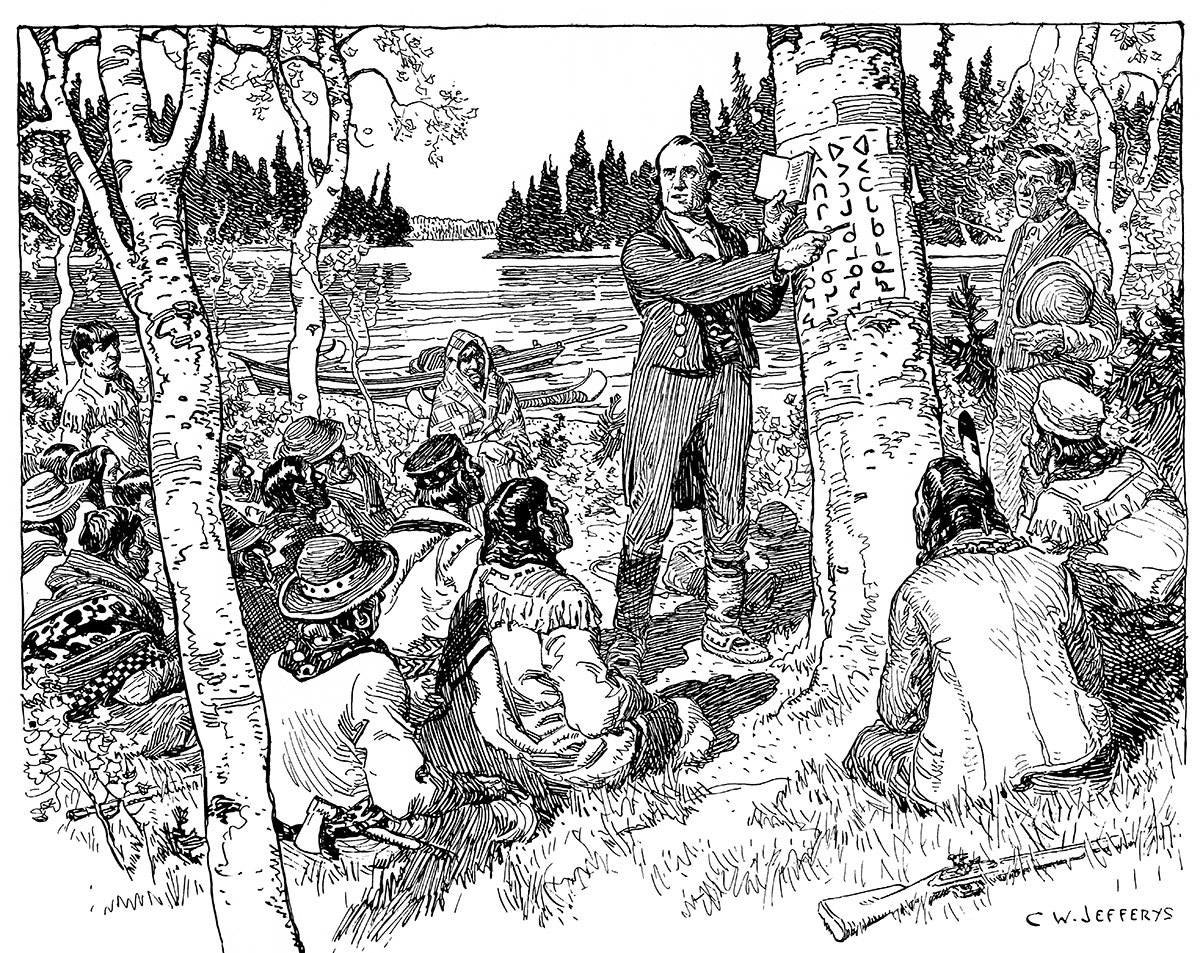
James Evans teaching his Cree syllabic writing system, upon which Abishabis's religious relics were based

Before beginning his ministry, Abishabis separated himself from the Cree and the HBC employees. (Note: A person named Wasetck, Wasitay, Wasitek, or Wasiteck—translated as "the Light"—may have accompanied Abishabis on this journey, and records from the James Bay area describe two men in Abishabis's ministry. Records from York Factory and Severn House only describe Abishabis.) Upon his return, he stated that he had traveled to the sky to a place where he received blessings and information, including the deity's physical features. Using a syllabic writing system, introduced to the Cree people by Methodist missionary James Evans, Abishabis and his associates created texts, charts, and pictographs with lines drawn upon wood or paper. Academics have given several explanations for what these lines depicted. Lee Irwin writes that they were seen as paths to heaven and hell; Philip H. Round said they were used to determine the will of spirits, allowing the Cree to purify themselves. Norman Williamson writes that the role of Abishabis's revelations was to determine possible futures for the Cree people; Timothy E. Williamson said the writings included warnings against adopting European customs and promises of meat on Earth and rewards in heaven for following these teachings. Abishabis taught his followers his technique so that they could create their own paths. He also claimed to have received a book from God called Tracks to Heaven.

Abishabis's group was probably monotheistic, believing in a self-existing creator of the world. Their deity was distant from the group and difficult to approach. Methodists described Jesus to the Cree as an intermediary between humans and God, allowing humans to make requests to their deity. Abishabis used the Methodist teachings as a foundation for the Cree to communicate with their own deity. His followers observed the Sabbath, sang psalms, and painted books.

Some sources state that Abishabis referred to himself as Jesus. Norman Williamson states that this was probably rhetoric from the Methodists, and that instead Abishabis claimed that Jesus had led his spiritual journey. Abishabis's followers did not deify him and considered his teachings to be revelations of God's will. They believed that the spirits called upon the Cree to recognise the leader as a prophet, replace the Methodist missionaries' books with religious texts created by Abishabis and his associates, and return to their pre-colonisation customs. Abishabis claimed that he was the "High Priest of the Tribe"; Norman Williamson stated that Abishabis's ministry was successful because he was the first person to declare himself a Christian leader among his Cree community. This allowed them to open themselves up to the possibility of a Cree person leading their Christian theological teachings. Round said that the religion's success stemmed from merging Christian ideas with the familiarity of the Cree writing system, which promised Cree empowerment.

== Legacy ==
Followers continued to adhere to Abishabis's teachings in the winter following his death, particularly among Indigenous people who were inland and unaware that he died. The HBC and the Methodist church persecuted Abishabis's followers to eliminate this religious practice. A woman and a boy spread Abishabis's teachings to the Albany Cree community; upon their discovery by the Methodists, they were forced to put their relics of Abishabis's teachings into a bonfire that was attended by Cree people and HBC employees.

Hargrave sent a report to the British government in London; their response praised Hargrave's efforts to have Abishabis killed. In February 1844, a Methodist missionary named George Barnley reported that the Cree people in Moose Factory were still under the influence of the religious teachings, which had also spread to Cree people in Eastmain. In May 1844, Governor George Simpson stated that enthusiasm for the teachings in the northern parts of his territory ended with Abishabis's death. Followers began to conceal their faith when the influence of the HBC increased and as its workers showed disapproval of this interpretation of Christianity. Other followers slowly disavowed Abishabis's teachings and destroyed materials that were inspired by him.

In 1930, anthropologist John Montgomery Cooper reported that Cree people in Moose Factory had passed down oral stories about the movement. The Cree in Moose Factory stated that Abishabis had introduced Christianity to them.
