= Gilbert Monture =

Gilbert Clarence Monture, OC, OBE
- Born: August 27, 1896; Six Nations of the Grand River, Ontario, Canada
- Died: June 19, 1973 (aged 76); Ottawa, Ontario, Canada

Gilbert Clarence Monture OC OBE (August 27, 1896 – June 19, 1973) was a Canadian civil servant.

A Mohawk born on August 27, 1896, on the Six Nations of the Grand River in Brant County, Ontario, and the great grandson of Joseph Brant. Monture served with the Royal Canadian Field Artillery as a gunner during World War I. After the war, he received Bachelor of Science degree in Mining and Metallurgy from Queen's University in 1921.

Joining the Canadian civil service in 1923, he was an editor of publications for the Department of Mines and Resources and in 1929 became chief of the Mineral Resources Division, Department of Mines and Technical Surveys in Ottawa. During World War II, he worked in the Department of Munitions and Supply. In 1946, he was made an Officer of the Order of the British Empire for his work with the Board.

He resigned from the civil service in 1956 and became Vice-President of Stratmat, Canadian mineral exploration and development company. In 1957, he received the Indian Achievement Award of the Indian Council Fire for notable contributions in his field. In 1958, he was appointed an honorary chief of the Mohawk tribe of the Six Nations Reserve.

In 1967, he was made an Officer of the Order of Canada. He is a member of Canada's Indian Hall of Fame. In 1966, he was awarded the Vanier Medal, awarded to "a person who has shown distinctive leadership and accomplishment in Canadian public service". He was awarded an honorary Doctor of Science degree from the University of Western Ontario.

He was a member of the Board of Governors of Trent University from 1966 to 1973. Monture House, near Rubidge Hall, at Trent University was named after him. He died on June 19, 1973, in Ottawa.
