= Joseph Tehawehron David =

Mohawk artist

Joseph Tehwehron David (1957–2004) was a Mohawk artist who became known for his role as a warrior during the Oka Crisis in 1990.

== Life before Oka ==
Joe David grew up in Kanehsatake, a small Mohawk (Kanienkehaka) community about 70 km west of Montreal, Quebec. David came from a big traditional family who embraced the Longhouse traditions.

Joe David’s artistic production focused on installations, sculpture, painting and mixed media. By the late 1980s, he had established himself as an artist with the sale of an artwork to the Public Service Commission and the group exhibition PHOTOMATON (1989), part of "Mois de la photo" at Galerie Articule in Montreal, Quèbec. From the artist’s CV, received from the Indigenous Art Centre David studied studio art and art education at Concordia University in Montreal.

== The Oka crisis ==
In 1990, Joe David's life and career moved in an unexpected direction as a result of the Oka crisis, a 78-day armed stand-off between the Kanehsatake Mohawks and the Canadian army that began during the summer of that year. The Oka Crisis began as a non-violent occupation of the Pines, a stand of hundred-year-old trees located in Kanehsatake and planted by the ancestors of the Mohawks who live there now. The protesters erected a barricade to protest a golf course expansion and the construction of a parking lot over the cemetery where the ancestors of the Kanehsatake Mohawks are buried.

The land dispute exploded into armed conflict on 11 July 1990 when the Mohawk protesters’ barricade was attacked by the Quebec provincial police, the Sûreté du Quebec (SQ). During the attack, SQ Corporal Marcel Lemay was killed. The presence of weapons carried by Mohawk men in their roles as warriors then became more evident.

In support of the Mohawk blockade at Kanehsatake, the warriors blocked every highway leading from Kahnawake to Montreal and seized the Mercier Bridge, closing it to the daily flow of 65,000 vehicles. On 16 August, the Canadian army surrounded the Mohawk protesters in Kanehsatake and were also stationed near the Mercier Bridge. The Mercier Bridge remained closed until the end of August 1990 when the Kahnawake Mohawks negotiated an agreement with the army.

On 26 September, the Mohawks (including Joe David) who had remained behind the barricade in Kanehsatake dismantled their guns and threw them in a fire. They burned tobacco and then walked out of the Pines holding their ceremonial masks. Many were detained by the Canadian Forces and arrested by the SQ. Joe David was among those who were charged as a result of the Oka Crisis. David, along with some of the other defendants, decided to use Mohawk sovereignty as a central defense strategy in their trial.

As examples of their assertion of Mohawk sovereignty, at the trial, the Mohawk defendants swore in witnesses in Mohawk using a string of wampum instead of a bible. They also won the right not to stand when the judge and jury arrived and left the courtroom.

In an article he wrote for the magazine Cultural Survival, Joe David wrote:

There was one point in the trial that will stay in my memory. Near the end of all the testimony, the Crown prosecutor objected to Bob Anton, an Oneida chief, testifying about a meeting he had with General Kent Foster of the Canadian Armed Forces, on the grounds that the evidence was hearsay. The judge didn't agree. He took a long time to explain to the jury that in this case the hearsay rule was becoming increasingly irrelevant. The judge described the case as a ‘dispute between two peoples.

...For the judge to use the word "peoples" to describe the conflict was very significant. I think it even has international implications. In the United Nations, the word ‘peoples’ has a specific and controversial meaning as ‘nations.’

The jury saw this and said, ‘Not guilty.’

— http://www.culturalsurvival.org/publications/cultural-survival-quarterly/canada/two-row-violation

== Later life ==
After the Oka Crisis, Joe David’s career as an artist progressed quickly. Within two years, David’s work had appeared in six significant group exhibitions, including LES POINTS CARDINAUX (1990), by Boréale Multimédia Centre in L'annonication, Quebec; Solidarity: Art after Oka (1991) at the SAW Gallery in Ottawa, Ontario; Strengthening the Spirit at the National Gallery of Canada in 1991; the 1991 Havana Biennale; OKANATA, at the A Space and Workscene galleries in Toronto, Ontario; and INDIGENA: Perspectives of Indigenous Peoples on 500 Years (1992), at the Canadian Museum of Civilization in Hull, Quebec. Two of David's paintings, created between 1990 and 1993, were purchased by the Indigenous Art Centre. Another was purchased by the Woodland Cultural Centre in Brantford, Ontario.

David also received media attention; he was featured in an article called "The Making of a Warrior" in Saturday Night magazine. He was portrayed in Loreen Pindera and Geoffrey York's book People of the Pines and Ronald Wright's book Stolen Continents. He also appeared in Alanis Obomsawin's documentary about the Oka Crisis, Kanehsatake, 270 Years of Resistance. In the years following David's involvement in the Oka Crisis, he lived alone in his farmhouse in Kanehsatake. As a result of the conditions during the 1990 stand-off, many of the protesters, including David, suffered from post-traumatic stress disorder and other mental health problems.

Despite this, David continued to paint and create installation art. He was part of the 1998 exhibit Irokesen Art which took place at Amerika Haus in Frankfurt, Germany. His work was published in the catalogue of the exhibit. His work was also shown in Montreal in 1998 at the ISART performance space, as part of the International Human Rights Festival.

In 1998, David was photographed by Jeff Thomas, an Ottawa-based Onondaga artist. Thomas juxtaposed the photo-portrait of David, a modern-day "warrior" who became an enemy of the Canadian government, with a portrait of a Mohawk emissary who visited the Queen of Great Britain in 1710 when the Iroquois were allies of the British.

In June 1999, Joe David was shot by Mohawk Peacekeepers during an altercation at his home in Kanesatake. It began after David yelled at a youth who was riding an ATV on his property. As a result of his injuries, he was essentially a quadriplegic for the rest of his life, with limited use of his arms and hands.

After his death in May 2004, David's ashes were scattered over Blue Mountain, his favourite place in Kanesatake. An online hommage to Joe David was created by his friend, Montreal-based artist Carole Beaulieu.
