= Agouhanna =

Agouhanna was the St. Lawrence Iroquoian term for chief or leader.

== Name misinterpretation ==
The word has been mistakenly interpreted as being the name of the chief of Hochelaga, on the site of present-day Montreal. This confusion stems from a passage in Bref récit by Jacques Cartier (translated by Richard Hakluyt), in which French explorer Cartier first meets the chief of Hochelaga. The passage reads "...the Lord & King of the countrey was brought upon 9 or 10 mens shoulders (whom in their tongue they call Agouhanna)" This passage was interpreted as meaning that Agouhanna was the name of the Hochelagan chief. This proves not to be the case, as in Jacques Cartier's work entitled Bref Recit Et Succincte Narration de la Navigation Faite en MDXXXV et MDXXXVI par Le Capitaine Jacques Cartier Aux Iles de Canada, Hochelaga, Saguenay, et Autres, he recounts his meeting with Donnacona, chief of Stadacona, near present-day Quebec City, saying, "...le seigneur de Canada nomé Donnacona en nom, & l'appelent pour seigneur Agouhanna..." This translates as: "the chief of Canada, called Donnacona by name, and called 'Agouhanna' for 'chief'." This means, therefore, that the word Agouhanna means 'chief', and is not a proper name. Jacques Cartier only referred to the leader of Hochelaga as the 'chief', and not by his name, which was never recorded.
