= Steven Bonspille =

Mohawk political leader

Steven Bonspille (Mohawk) is a political leader; he was Grand Chief (2005–2008) of the Kanesatake community located northwest of Montreal, Quebec, Canada.

== History ==
Bonspille is a traditionalist, elected to the chiefs' council in 2001. The community had adopted a new system of electoral politics in 1991, following the Oka Crisis. Formerly chiefs were selected by clan mothers as part of a traditional, hereditary system based in matrilineal kinship. Children are considered born into their mother's clans in the community, and derive their status from the mother.

In the early 2000s, Bonspille became a key figure in a power struggle in the government of Kanesatake. He and two other traditionalist chiefs at the time, Pearl Bonspille and John Harding (Sha ko hen the tha), opposed then-Grand Chief James Gabriel (1996-2004), who had been elected three times. These three men generally considered Gabriel a modernist.

Journalist Benoit Aubin has observed that there are strains of ethnic tension among people in the community. Harding and Gabriel both have mixed ancestry, but Harding's mother is Mohawk, so he belongs to her clan under the matrilineal system. Gabriel has a Mohawk father and is a registered member of the community, but his mother is not Mohawk.

Among the issues, the traditionalists were concerned about Gabriel's trying to reduce sales of contraband cigarettes. Most importantly, they opposed his having hired private police forces (with funding from Ottawa) for a drug raid to be conducted in the community in January 2004. More than 200 protesters confined these officers to the police station, and that night there was violence and arson in the community. Numerous people were prosecuted. Grand Chief Gabriel left the community for his safety after his house and car were burned. During an interim period, traditionalists created a police force in the community; an official interim police director provided support to those Mohawk living in Oka, Quebec, which surrounds Kanesatake.

In 2005 Bonspille defeated Gabriel in the popular election for grand chief. A slate of six persons were elected to the chiefs' council (band council), replacing both Harding and Pearl Bonspille. All were supporters of James Gabriel. After finishing his term in 2008, Bonspille moved with his family to adjacent Oka, Quebec.
