= Elizabeth Phillips (Stó:lō Nation elder) =

Canadian indigenous elder (born 1939)

Elizabeth Phillips HON D.Lit
- Siyamiyateliyot
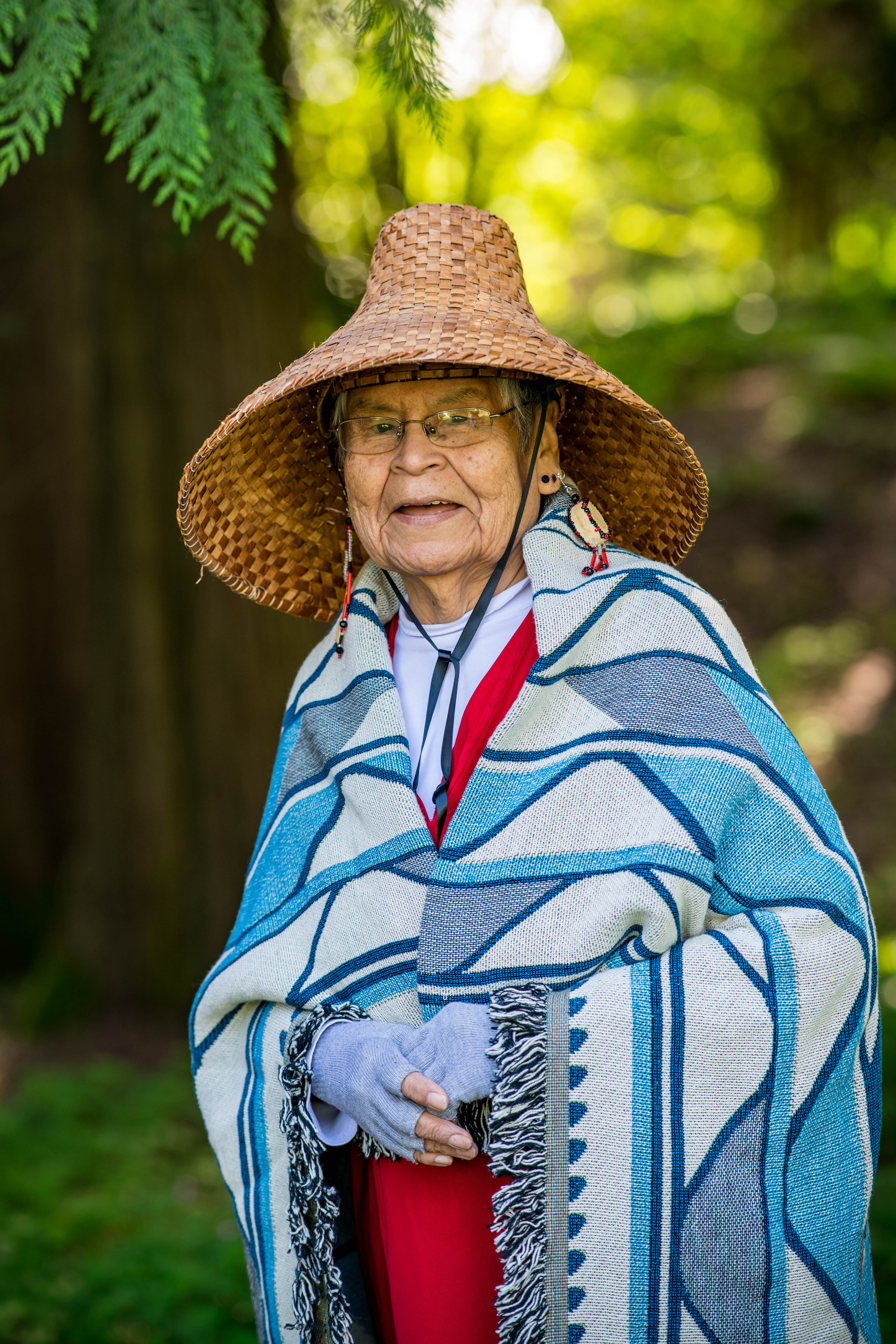
- Born: 1939; Cheam First Nation, British Columbia
- Citizenship: Canada
- Education: St. Mary's Residential School
- Occupation: Language preservation
- Known for: the last known fluent speaker of the Stó:lō Nation’s Upriver Halkomelem
- Notable work: Co-Authored: Talking in Halq’eméylem, Documenting Conversation in an Indigenous Language

Siyamiyateliyot Elizabeth Phillips was born in 1939 on the Cheam First Nation of British Columbia, Canada. She is a Stó:lō Nation elder and the last fluent speaker of Halq’emeylem, an Indigenous language of Fraser Valley and Fraser Canyon in British Columbia. She has committed over 50 years of work towards language preservation.

== Biography ==
Phillips' mother died in childbirth, and her father brought her to live with the Peters family on Sea Bird Island. The Peters family were fluent Upriver Halq’emeylem speakers. From the age of 8 to 15, Phillips attended St. Mary's Residential School in Mission, British Columbia, where she was forbidden from speaking Halq’emeylem. However, she was able to retain her fluency by thinking in the language.

In her early 30s, Phillips was approached by local leaders to begin working as a translator for the elders' language circle. In the 1980s she formally began working on language preservation through the Coqualeetza Cultural Education Center. Phillips, along with 11 other elders, worked with linguist Brent Galloway to create a Halq’emeylem writing system and complete a dictionary. Phillips stepped in to continue the work of Elizabeth Herrling who was working to record the language in stories but passed away before completing her work.

She has been working with linguist Strang Burton for two decades. Together they have recorded both stories and the dictionary. Burton has used language ultrasound to record the movement of Phillips' tongue to aid learners in pronunciation.

Phillips still regularly visits Halq'eméylem language classrooms at the University of the Fraser Valley and at area schools. She also consults on the development of courses.

The University of the Fraser Valley recognized Phillips in 2018 with an honorary Doctor of Letters degree.

== Publications ==
- Phillips, S. E., Gutierrez, X. T., & Russell, S. (2017). Talking in Halq'eméylem: Documenting conversation in an indigenous language.
