= Kanesatake =

Kanehsatà꞉ke
- Mohawk Territory
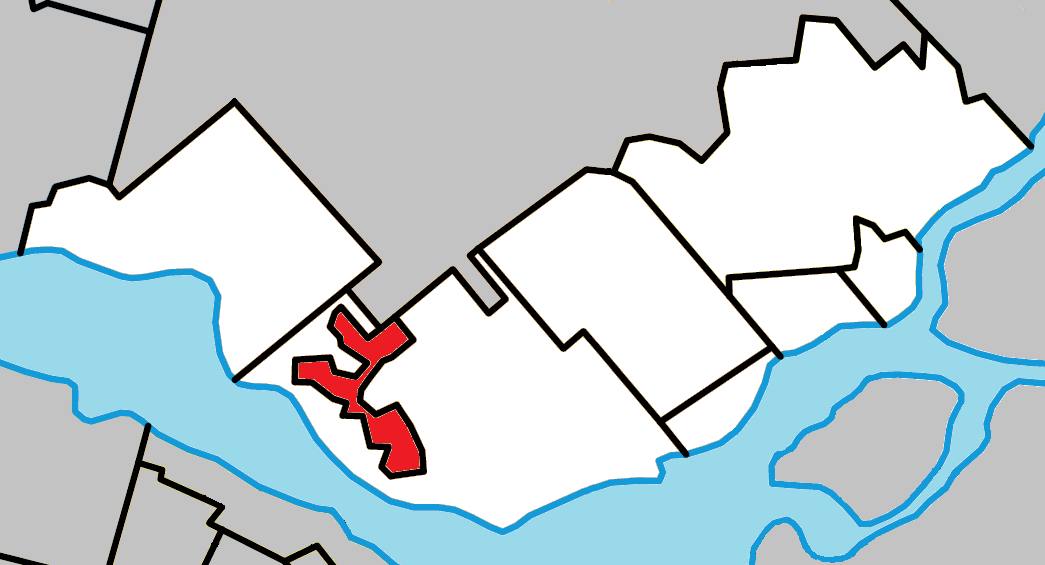
- Location within Deux-Montagnes RCM.

- Location in southern Quebec Kanehsatà꞉ke (Greater Montreal) Kanehsatà꞉ke (Quebec)
- Coordinates: 45°29′N 74°07′W
- Country: Canada
- Province: Quebec
- Region: Laurentides
- RCM: Deux-Montagnes

Government
  - Grand Chief: Vacant
  - Federal riding: Argenteuil—Papineau—Mirabel
  - Prov. riding: Mirabel

Area
  - Land: 11.88 km^{2} (4.59 sq mi)

Population (2022)
  - Total: 1,364
- Demonym: Kanesatakehro꞉non
- Time zone: UTC−5 (EST)
  - Summer (DST): UTC−4 (EDT)

Kanesatake (Mohawk: Kanehsatà꞉ke) is a Mohawk (Kanien'kéha꞉ka) settlement on the shore of the Lake of Two Mountains in southwestern Quebec, Canada, at the confluence of the Ottawa and St. Lawrence rivers and about 48 kilometres (30 mi) west of Montreal. People who reside in Kanehsatà꞉ke are referred to as Mohawks of Kanesatake (Kanehsata'kehró꞉non in Mohawk). As of 2022, the total registered population was 2,751, with a total of about 1,364 persons living on the territory. Both they and the Mohawk of Kahnawake, Quebec (Kahnawà꞉ke in Mohawk), a reserve located south of the river from Montreal, also control and have hunting and fishing rights to Doncaster 17 Indian Reserve (Tiowéro꞉ton in Mohawk).

The Mohawk people historically are the most easterly nation of the Haudenosaunee or Six Nations of the Iroquois. By 1730, this confederacy was made up of six Iroquoian-speaking nations who were based mostly east and south of the Great Lakes, in present-day New York along the Mohawk River west of the Hudson, and in Pennsylvania. They also controlled hunting territory by right of conquest that extended into the Ohio and Shenandoah valleys.

After French exploration and its beginnings of colonial developments, its traders worked with the Mohawk in villages in the Mohawk Valley. Jesuit missionaries evangelized their people. Some Mohawk moved closer for trade with French colonists in what became Quebec, Canada, or settled in nearby mission villages. In the mid-nineteenth century, after Great Britain had taken over former French territory east of the Mississippi River following its defeat of France in the Seven Years' War, its colonial government formally recognized the people of Kanehsatà꞉ke as one of the Seven Nations of Canada. These were First Nations who were allies of the British.

Today this territory, classified by the federal government as an interim land base, is one of several major settlements in Canada where the Mohawk are self-governing; the others are classified under the Indian Act as reserves. The reserves include Kahnawake and Akwesasne along the St. Lawrence River, both formed during the French colonial period; the Six Nations of the Grand River First Nation, a reserve organized after the American Revolutionary War by the Crown to provide the Haudenosaunee with land in compensation for what they lost of their former territories in the Thirteen Colonies; and Tyendinaga, where the Mohawk constitute the majority of residents.

== History ==
By the 14th century, some Iroquoian-speaking peoples, later called the St. Lawrence Iroquoians, had created fortified villages along the fertile valley of what is now called the St. Lawrence River. They spoke a discrete Laurentian language. Among their villages were Stadacona and Hochelaga, recorded as visited in 1535–1536 by French explorer Jacques Cartier.

By the time Samuel de Champlain explored the same area 75 years later, the villages had disappeared. The Kanienkehaka (Mohawk), based in other Iroquoian territories, used the valley for hunting grounds and routes for war parties. Historians are continuing to examine the St. Lawrence Iroquoian culture, but theorize that the stronger Kanienkehaka (Mohawk) waged war against this people to get control of the fur trade and hunting along the valley downriver from Tadoussac. (The Montagnais controlled Tadoussac, which was closer to the Atlantic coast.) For a period the Wyandot people (also known as Huron), another Iroquoian-speaking people based north of Lake Ontario, may also have hunted here.

As noted above, by 1600, the Mohawk of the Haudenosaunee Confederacy, based largely in present-day New York and Pennsylvania south of the Great Lakes, used the St. Lawrence Valley for hunting grounds. The Mohawk were the easternmost of the Five Nations. While the Mohawk and contemporary Iroquoian nations shared certain culture with the earlier Iroquoian groups, archeological and linguistic studies since the 1950s have demonstrated that the Mohawk and St. Lawrence Iroquoians were distinctly separate peoples. Historians and anthropologists believe the Mohawk pushed out or destroyed the St. Lawrence Iroquoians.

In the colonial period, the French established trading posts and missions with the Mohawk. They also had intermittent conflict with the tribe and raiding took place between them. Some Mohawk moved near or in Montreal for trading and protection at mission villages, located south of the St. Lawrence River.

In 1717, the King of France granted the Mohawk in Quebec a tract of land 9 miles long by 9 miles wide about 40 miles to the northwest of Montreal, under the condition that they leave the island of Montreal. The settlement of Kanesatake was formally founded as a Catholic mission, a seigneury under the supervision of the Sulpician Order for 300 Christian Mohawk, about 100 Algonquin, and approximately 250 Nipissing peoples in their care. Over time the Sulpicians claimed total control of the land, gaining a deed that gave them legal title. But the Mohawk had believed that this land was being held in trust for them.

The Sulpician mission village of Lake of Two Mountains (Lac des Deux Montagnes), west of Montreal, became known both by its Algonquin name Oka (meaning "pickerel"), and the Mohawk language Kanehsatà꞉ke ("sandy place"); however, the Algonquin also called the village Ganashtaageng after the Mohawk-language name.

During the colonial period, a majority of the Mohawk in Quebec converted to Catholicism. They grew wary of the Sulpicians due to mistreatment and unjust dealings with regard to their right to the land. The Sulpicians sold some of it for settlement, and the village of Oka developed around the Kanesatake reserve. In 1787 Chief Aughneeta complained by letter to Sir John Johnson, the British superintendent general of Indian Affairs, that the Mohawk had moved to Kanesatake only after being promised a deed to the land by the King of France.

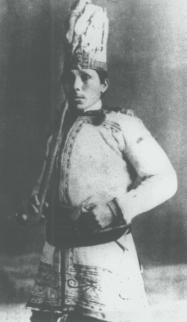
Joseph Onasakenrat, Kanesatà꞉ke Chief, 1868–1881

By 1851, the Mohawk made seven other protests about the land to the government. Mohawk dissent increased, and their conversion to Protestantism in 1851 was avoided only when the Sulpicians excommunicated 15 activists. In 1868 the Mohawk selected Sosé Onasakenrat as chief at the age of 22. Baptized as Joseph, he had been educated by the Sulpicians in a Catholic seminary and worked with them afterward at Oka. That year he traveled to Montreal to present the Mohawk land claim to the seigneury, but to no avail. Later that year, he and many other Mohawk converted to the Protestant Methodist Episcopal Church, as they were outraged by their treatment by the Catholic Church.

In 1880 Onasakenrat was ordained and became a Methodist missionary to the Mohawk-dominated communities at Kahnawake and Akwesasne. These later were designated as First Nations reserves, primarily occupied by Mohawk. He began to urge moderation and acceptance of a Sulpician offer to buy land for the Mohawk away from Oka and to pay for their move. He lost the support of many followers by this change in position and died in 1881 at age 35. Six months later, when the Sulpicians had completed arrangements for the relocation, only 20 percent of the Mohawk left Kanehsatà꞉ke to relocate to present-day Wahta Mohawk Territory near Muskoka, Ontario.

In 1910 the Sulpician Order claim to the land was upheld by the Canadian Supreme Court. Kanesatake has been defined by the federal government as an 'interim land base', unlike the reserves, which are a creation of the Indian Act.

== Governance ==
The Mohawk at Kanehsatà꞉ke continued "custom", or the traditional practice of having clan mothers select chiefs from clans with hereditary leadership responsibility. Clan mothers made the selection and could remove their support from a chief whose actions displeased them, causing him to step down. Like the other Haudenosaunee nations and many other Native American tribes, the Mohawk had a matrilineal kinship system, with inheritance and property passed through the maternal line.

In the late 20th century, the Mohawk renewed a land claim case to recover their property at Kanesatake. The courts ruled against them on technical issues. The settlement is surrounded by the city of Oka, Quebec.

In 2001 Parliament passed S-24, to clarify the relationship between Kanesatake and the federal government, and make the band's relationship with provincial and federal governments comparable to those of the governments of reserves. Different members of the community have disputed the interpretation of the intent and implementation of this act. Disagreements over this legislation added to internal tensions among different groups on the reserve.

=== Kanehsatà꞉ke Resistance ===
Kanehsatà꞉ke is the oldest continuing Mohawk community today and existed pre-European contact. It was the first community to accept kaianera'kó:wa, and is mentioned in the condolence ceremony (hi hi) of a chief and clan mother. The town of Oka developed along the Lake of Two Mountains through the fraudulent sale of land of the Mohawk community of Kanehsatà꞉ke by the Sulpician order. The Sulpicians sold off land to French settlers and were the biggest landowners in the region.

Since 1717, when the Sulpician priests arrived with their Mohawk, Nippising, and Algonquin Christian converts, the Mohawk have contested the Sulpician land claim. They argue that the King of France, Louis XIV, never owned the land and thus the Crown did not have the right to grant the land to the Sulpician Order.

Included in this territory is a pine forest and cemetery that was long used by the Mohawk. It is still accessible, although it is not part of the Kanesatake reserve. The Mohawks of Kanesatake have tried many times to resolve the land dispute (as part of their land claim against the government and Sulpician mission), but were rejected by the Crown on technical issues.

In 1990, the town of Oka unilaterally approved plans to expand their 9-hole golf course to an 18-hole course and related buildings. The Mohawk protested formally because the development would affect the historic cemetery, and they considered the land to be sacred. The city persisted in letting the developer proceed in spite of protests from the community. In response, the Mohawk barricaded a secondary dirt road leading into the pines slated for development, in order to prevent the developers from cutting any trees.

After the city gained three injunctions against the barricade, and the Mohawk had tried to gain a moratorium on development, the provincial Sûreté du Québec (SQ) police raided the barricade in the early morning hours of July 11, 1990. Oka requested support from the SQ, which barricaded Route 344 leading to Kanehsatà꞉ke. In the first days of the confrontation, a police officer was killed in an exchange of gunfire with the protesters.

The SQ were joined by a squad of Canadian army and Montreal police. The Quebec government requested support from the Canadian Army, which sent in 3700 troops. This was the beginning of a 78-day standoff between the Mohawk Nation and their allies (both aboriginal and non-aboriginal) against the SQ and Canadian Army.

The sister community of Kahnawake erected a barricade on the Mercier Bridge at the South Shore of Montreal, in support of the Mohawk at Kahnesatake. Non-Mohawk residents of the area became enraged about traffic delays in trying to get through the area and across the river.

Provincial and national leaders participated in negotiations between the Mohawk and the provincial government. Negotiations between the Mohawk nation and the Quebec and the Canadian governments did not resolve the land issue. The International Federation of Human Rights, based in Paris, France, investigated and concluded that neither the provincial nor federal governments acted in good faith during negotiations. But the Mohawk at Kanehsatà꞉ke were forced by the Canadian Army to remove their barricades. Police and military forces pushed the remaining protesters back until they were confined to the Onentokon Treatment Centre and surrounded by the military.

In the end, the Mohawk chose to leave the treatment center, although they did not formally surrender. Those who remained at the treatment center were immediately arrested, with the men and the women separated and sent to the Farnham army base. Other Mohawk activists were ultimately arrested for criminal acts committed before the army moved into the community. These Mohawk were convicted.

All the Mohawk arrested at the treatment center on the issue of the barricades were acquitted. A separate trial was held for individual Mohawks, who were charged. As of 2019, the land dispute is still ongoing.

=== Representation in other media ===
- Some of the events and history are explored in Alanis Obomsawin's documentary film, Kanehsatake: 270 Years of Resistance (1993).
- Beans, a fictional semi-autobiographical film written and directed by Tracey Deer, was featured in the 2021 New York International Children's Film Festival. Set during the Oka crisis, the film features a lead role played by Kiawenti'io Tarbell, a young Mohawk actress from Akwesasne.

=== Electoral changes ===
In 1991, the people adopted an electoral political system for the first time (see Governance below). Because they do not come under the Indian Act, their choice was still considered "custom." There has continued to be internal division over how chiefs are selected. In the first election, Jerry Peltier was elected as grand chief and served two terms into 1996.

In 2013 the Kanehsatà꞉ke Health Centre Inc. was the first Indigenous health centre in North America to receive a Baby Friendly Accreditation.

That same year, the local Pikwadin group, a funded initiative of the First Nations Human Resource and Development Commission of Quebec, began a re-vamp of the local radio station CKHQ 101.7 FM. It had become idle after its previous manager died in 2003. In 2004, the station failed to renew its broadcasting licence with the CRTC. The radio station was running under a pirate radio status pending a licence renewal until it was accepted on June 17, 2014. The Montréal-based non-profit organization Exeko assisted with the licensing process through their idAction program.

The band has had a traditional form of governance under the longhouse, a system that existed pre-contact. This is still practiced by much of the community. Canada refuses to recognize the longhouse and excludes its leaders from any form of decision-making on land rights.

=== Governance ===
Following the Oka Crisis, the Mohawk of Kanehsatà꞉ke altered their method of governance, under provisions of the Indian Act. In 1991, citizens held the first general elections for grand chief and six council chiefs. Chiefs previously had traditional hereditary claims to positions through their clans under the matrilineal kinship system, in which inheritance and property were passed through the maternal lines. Chiefs were nominated and could be unseated by clan mothers.

In 1991, Jerry Peltier was elected as grand chief and served until 1996. He also served as Chairman for the Quebec First Nations Education Council.

In the 1990s, the nation began to exercise more autonomy and established its own police force.

In 2004 and 2005, disputes over the governance practices of Grand Chief James Gabriel, who had been elected three times in succession, resulted in violence and political disruption in Kanehsatà꞉ke. Chiefs Pearl Bonspille, Steven Bonspille and John Harding (Sha ko hen the tha) opposed Gabriel. They and other opponents effectively ended Gabriel's tenure as grand chief.

John Harding and fellow council chiefs Steven Bonspille (who was elected to the council in 2001) and Pearl Bonspille said they opposed Gabriel's attempt to control policing. In January 2004, in concert with Quebec provincial police, Gabriel brought in more than 60 officers from other reserves and forces for a drug raid. These three chiefs considered Gabriel's action to be an unlawful attempt to usurp the power of the Police Commission. After 200 community members surrounded the police station, the 67 special constables were forced to take shelter there. Gabriel lost his home when it was burned in an alleged arson incident; he left the community for Montreal. Following his departure, "A long criminal trial resulted in multiple convictions of Kanesatake residents for arson, rioting and other offences."

Meanwhile, the reserve organized a Community Watch team to counter the lack of a police force. A liaison team was established with the SQ. Political communication lines were opened up with the Quebec government to prevent another crisis like the one in 1990 at Oka.

Following the overthrow of Gabriel, elections were held on June 26, 2005. Steven Bonspille defeated Gabriel in the election for grand chief. Harding and Pearl Bonspille were both replaced as chiefs on the council when six Gabriel allies were elected to the open posts. The Nation operated under a federal trusteeship, while an investigation was conducted of alleged spending excesses under Gabriel. Findings were not conclusive.

Tribal engagement in politics has remained high. In 2008 some 25 candidates ran for seven seats on the council. Steven Bonspille did not run for re-election, having moved off the reserve to Oka. More than 2300 Kanesatake voters were registered: 1685 who live on the reserve territory and 664 outside.

As of 2015, the grand chief of Kanesatake was Serge Otsi Simon. Soon after his election, he spoke in an interview with the Montreal Gazette about the Oka Crisis.

== Education ==
The French school board is Commission scolaire de la Seigneurie-des-Mille-Îles. The zoned schools are:

- École des Pins (Oka)
- École secondaire d'Oka (Oka)

The area English school board is the Sir Wilfrid Laurier School Board. As of 2014, 55 students from Kanesatake choose to attend Lake of Two Mountains High School in Deux-Montagnes. Kanesatake is in the attendance boundary of Lake of Two Mountains. Mountainview Elementary School and Saint Jude Elementary School, both in Deux-Montagnes, also serve this community.

== Notable Kanesatakehro:non ==
- Sonia Bonspille Boileau, filmmaker
- Steven Bonspille, former grand chief of Kanesatake
- Joseph Tehawehron David (1957–2004), artist
- Ellen Gabriel (born 1959), artist and activist
- James Gabriel, former grand chief of Kanesatake
- John Harding, former council chief of Kanesatake
- Joseph Onasakenrat (1845–1881), former grand chief of Kanesatake

== See also ==
- Mohawks of Kanesatake
- Kanehsatake: 270 Years of Resistance, 1993 documentary by Alanis Obomsawin
- Joseph Onasakenrat, Chief of the Mohawk nation at Kanesatake, 1868–1881
