= Joseph Onasakenrat =

Mohawk chief (1845–1881)

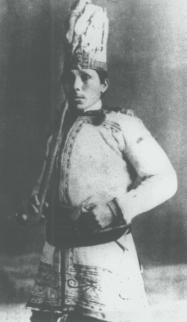
Joseph Onasakenrat

Joseph Onasakenrat (also, Onesakenrat) (September 4, 1845 – February 8, 1881), also known as Sosé Onasakenrat, was a Mohawk chief of Kanesatake, one of the Seven Nations of Canada in the eighteenth and nineteenth centuries.

Onasakenrat (meaning Swan or White Feather) was born to a Mohawk family near Oka, Quebec. He was baptized Catholic and named Joseph, and was fluent in Mohawk and French. In 1860, he entered the Petit Séminaire de Montréal where he studied for the priesthood for about three years. Louis Riel was notably one of his classmates. He returned to Oka and was appointed as secretary of the Sulpician mission.

On July 25, 1868, Onasakenrat was elected chief of the Mohawk community. A photograph of him estimated from that time shows him wearing the Two Dog Wampum, as wampums were proof of title to Mohawk territory. Almost immediately, he travelled to Ottawa to meet with the Superintendent of Indian Affairs. Onasakenrat petitioned the government to return land to the Mohawks which was, at the time, held by the Sulpicians. The Mohawk had learned that the Sulpicians had changed the terms of an earlier land grant deed and, rather than holding the land in trust for the Mohawk, had taken control of it. They were already selling it off to settlers.

Onasakenrat accused the seminary of exploiting the natives and of intentionally keeping them impoverished. The bishop threatened to excommunicate anyone involved in the petition, prompting Onasakenrat, along with most of the Mohawk community, to leave the Catholic Church that winter and convert to Methodism.

On February 18, 1869, the chief confronted the Sulpicians again, challenging their authority over the land by cutting down a large elm tree without permission. One week later, backed by an armed band of forty men, Onasakenrat demanded that the Sulpicians leave Oka within eight days. The priests refused to leave, and instead obtained a warrant for his arrest. Montréal police arrived and arrested the group, although they were released a few days later.

In 1877, Onasakenrat was charged after the Catholic Church in Oka was destroyed by fire in the early morning of June 14. At the time, the Mohawk were engaged in a dispute with white Canadian settlers over logging rights on their reserve. A group of Protestant Mohawks were accused of starting the fire. The group was tried quickly, and found not guilty by a jury.

A devoutly religious man, Onasakenrat became an ordained Methodist minister in 1880, and worked to translate religious works into the Mohawk language. He translated the Gospels (1880) and several hymns: Neh Nase Tsi Shokȣatakȣen. At the time of his sudden death at Oka on 7 Feb. 1881 at age 35, he was working on a translation of the remainder of the Bible, having completed up to the Epistle to the Hebrews.

He is interred in Montreal with a cast-iron painted headstone in Mount Royal Cemetery in section A2.

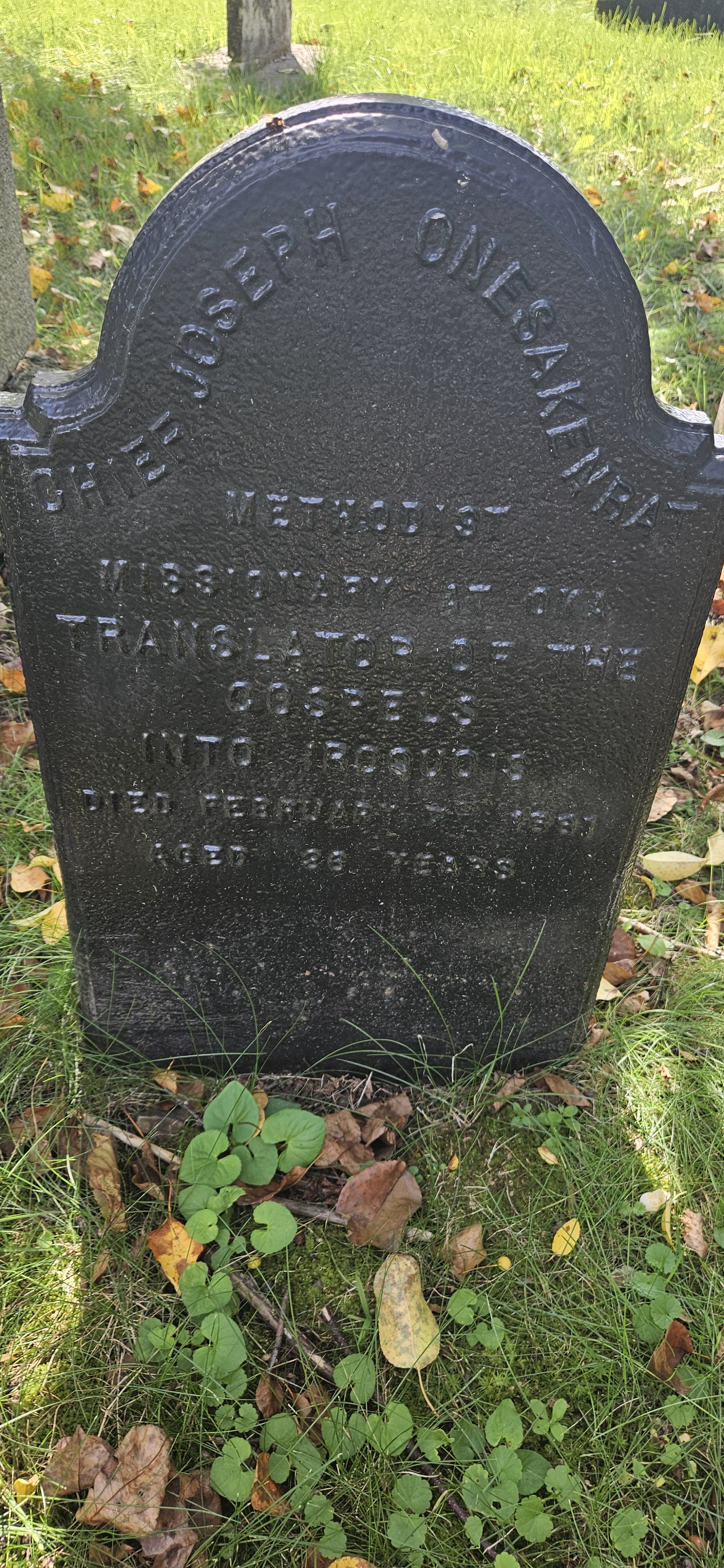
Headstone, tombstone, grave marker of Onesakenrat, Onasakenrat, at Mount Royal Cemetery in section A2 in Montreal, Canada
