= Doncaster, Quebec =

Doncaster Tioweró:ton
- Indian reserve
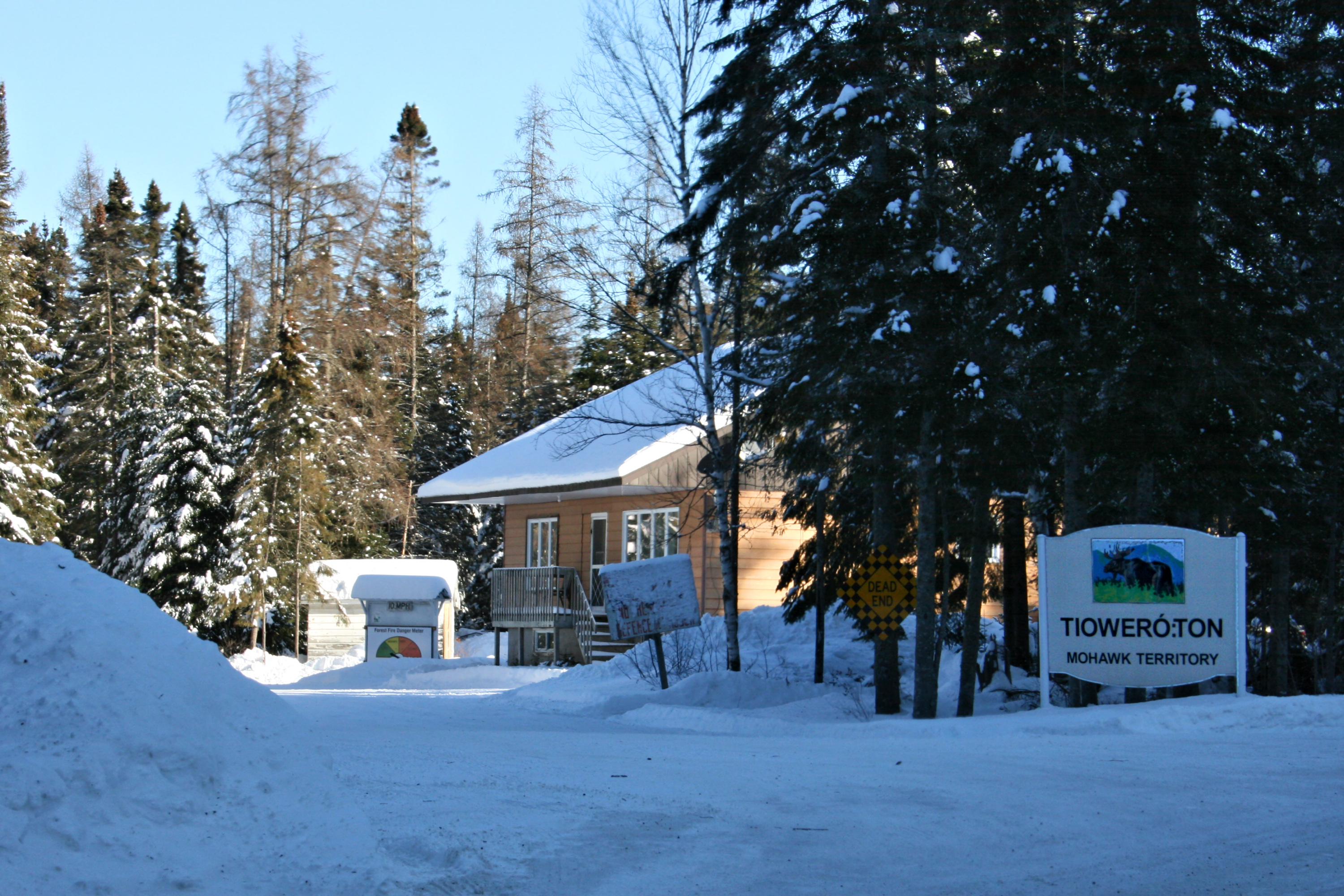

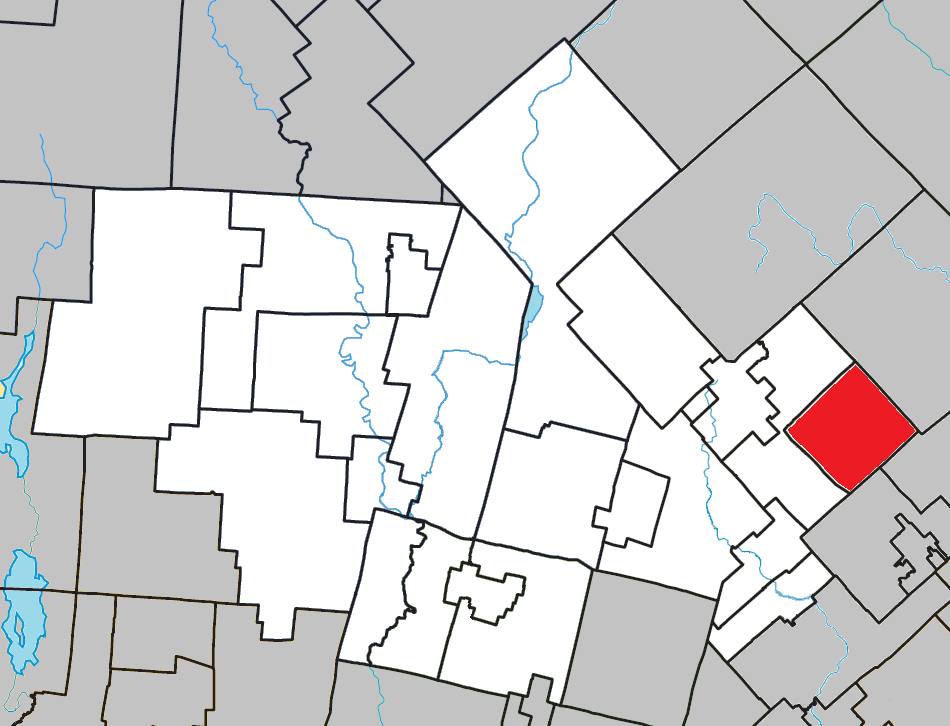
- Location within Les Laurentides RCM

- Location within Central Quebec
- Coordinates: 46°09′N 74°07′W
- Country: Canada
- Province: Quebec
- Region: Laurentides
- Regional County: n/a
- Established: August 9, 1853

Government
  - Type: Indian Reserve
  - Federal riding: Laurentides—Labelle
  - Prov. riding: Bertrand

Area
  - Total: 78.00 km^{2} (30.12 sq mi)
  - Land: 76.13 km^{2} (29.39 sq mi)

Population (2025)
  - Total: 0
  - Density: 0/km^{2} (0/sq mi)
  - Pop (2016-21): 0%
- Time zone: UTC-5 (EST)
  - Summer (DST): UTC-4 (EDT)

Doncaster (Mohawk: Tioweró:ton), officially designated as Doncaster 17 by Crown–Indigenous Relations and Northern Affairs Canada, is a Mohawk Native Reserve in the Laurentides region of Quebec, Canada. It belongs to the Mohawk First Nation, specifically the people of the reserves at Kanesatake and Kahnawake.

The reserve is located some 30 kilometres (19 mi) east of Mont-Tremblant in the geographic township Doncaster, named after the city in England. It is uninhabited or occasionally sparsely inhabited, and used by the Mohawk as a hunting and fishing territory.

In the late nineteenth century, European-Canadian squatters sometimes occupied portions of this land, and repeatedly appealed to the government to have it opened up to settlement. The Mohawk refused to lease or sell the land, and in 1904 the government ended the dispute by paying squatters the value of their improvements. They gained a promise that the latter would leave and never return, in exchange for not being prosecuted for trespass.

== History ==
On August 30, 1851, an act was authorized to set apart lands in Lower Canada for the use and benefit of the Seven Nations of Canada, First Nation tribes. Two years later on August 9, 1853, the Governor General in Council approved the distribution list as proposed by the Commissioner of Crown Lands, John Rolph. According to that list, the "Indians of Caughnawaga (Kahnawake) and lake Deux Montagnes" (Kanesatake, also referred to as Oka) were allotted the south-east quarter of the township of Doncaster, behind the township of Wexford. The area indicated was 16,000 acres (65 km^{2}).

On May 26, 1890, some 43 squatters, inhabitants of the Doncaster Township, signed a petition in the presence of Fr Lajeunesse requesting the abolition of the Mohawk reserve in the township:

"Honorable Sir,

Us subsigned, living in the Doncaster District, are asking very humbly for you to use your upmost influence to make the savage reserve disappear from our district and to make a land survey. This reserve which contains a large number of excellent lands proper to agriculture, located in the middle of occupied lands by a French Canadian population annexed to our village, is observed as an anomaly and all of them are hoping to see it disappear.

Anyways, it can't be of any utility to the savages who will never come to install themselves, since the games are lacking. Also, the wood is being stolen from all sides, they are taking the wood, so the sooner it will be measures, fewer damages will be done.

We are observing that the reserve in the township of Doncaster is a big obstacle to colonisation progress in our locality. Our municipality is suffering from it since this reserve contains about the third of the district. For these reasons, Honorable Sir, we hope that you will favorably accept our request, and we won't stop praying that Ste Lucie of Doncaster."

A letter of 22 January 1896, from the national government's Deputy Superintendent General of Indian Affairs to E. L. Newcomb, Esq, Deputy Minister of Justice, Ottawa, noted the continuing nature of this dispute and the illegal efforts of the squatters to claim Mohawk lands. He wrote the following:

“Sir, I beg to enclose this file numbered 34 070 of this Department containing

correspondences respecting Squatters in the Doncaster Indian Reserve and would refer to Memorandum of 3rd December 1893 which gives a summary of the correspondence and also to letter addressed to Agent Brosseau on the 9th Ultimo and his reply of the 10th instant in which he states that the Indians are quite determined neither to lease nor sell the Reserve for any consideration and if the Squatters have made improvements thereon, the Department should charge them a rent for the land in as much as the Tribe requires the land for some of its members.

Will you be good enough to advise me, under the circumstances whether the Department could succeed in a suit of ejectment against these trespassers or whether it could charge a rental for past use and occupation of the land and also for future use and occupation without a Surrender having been obtained from the Indians.

Your obedient servant Deputy Superintendent General

Of Indian Affairs.”

During the period ranging from 1897 to 1905, squatters of Ste. Lucie made several attempts to obtain land grants from the government in order to legitimize their settlements in the Doncaster reserve. The resulting correspondence repeated the established rules governing the use and purposes of the reserve.

But the Mayor of Ste Lucie of Doncaster and squatters continued to try to gain approval of their illegal improvements: buildings and farms. In 1904 the government paid compensation to the squatters for their land improvements; in turn, they had to sign an affidavit promising to leave the reserve and never to return, in exchange for not being sued for trespassing.

In 1905 Indian Affairs proposed that Doncaster 17 should be managed on a "per quota" basis by both the Kahnawake and Kanehsatake bands. The Mohawk of Kahnawake comprised two-thirds of the total population of the two nations, and those of Kanehsatake one-third. La Presse reported on 16 September 1905, that the Indian agent for the bands suggested this arrangement.

"At the last council meeting of the tribe, also attended by representatives from each of the Oka [Kahnehsatake] tribes and Gibson, Muskoka, Ont., To find a way to share the Doncaster Reserve, containing an area of 18,000 acres, located in the county of Terrebonne. This reservation was granted 50 years ago, to the Iroquois of Oka and Caughnawaga [Kahnawake], and since the revenues were split between the two tribes per capita. Our people ask sharing the reserve the same way; the Okas, who are only a quarter, ask for equal sharing and not per capita. The Caughnawagas number 2,100 souls. This issue has been under consideration since twelve months."

The bands at some point agreed to this sharing arrangement: Kahnawake would have 2/3 of the financial responsibility and Kanesatake 1/3. Previous ministerial correspondences had noted shared management of Doncaster 17 reserve, which was more in keeping with the Mohawk traditional practices related to use of communal lands.

The issue has been unchanged into the 21st century. It is still unsettled through the current administrative management of the department of Indigenous and Northern Affairs Canada.

== Demographics ==
Population:

- Population in 2021: n/a
- Population in 2016: n/a
- Population in 2011: n/a
- Population in 2006: n/a
- Population in 2001: n/a
- Population in 1996: 0
- Population in 1991: 4
- Population in 1986: 6
- Population in 1981: 5
- Population in 1976: 10
- Population in 1971: 9
- Population in 1966: 10
- Population in 1961: 10
- Population in 1956: 1
- Population in 1951: 2
