= John Harding (Sha ko hen the tha) =

John Harding (Sha ko hen teh tha) (b. ?, Mohawk) is a politician who was elected to the chiefs' council at Kanesatake (2001–2004), a Mohawk settlement in Quebec, Canada. During his period in office, he was part of organized opposition to Grand Chief James Gabriel in 2003–2004. In 2005, neither Harding nor Gabriel were re-elected as chiefs.

== Early life and education ==
John Harding (Sha ko hen teh tha - Mohawk name) was born to a Mohawk mother and into her Turtle clan. In the matrilineal kinship system, inheritance and property are passed through the maternal line. Harding's father is not Mohawk. Harding grew up in his mother's Mohawk culture and identifies as a traditionalist.

== Career ==
Harding worked as a policeman in the settlement, where the self-governing Mohawk have some jurisdiction over certain crimes. He is strongly supportive of the Mohawk tradition of the council chiefs setting consensus for direction of the people.

In January 2004 Harding and fellow chiefs Pearl Bonspille and Steven Bonspille, half of the six-member council, opposed Grand Chief James Gabriel. The latter had been popularly elected three times. The dissenters said that Gabriel had not consulted with them or the council on his decision to conduct a raid with the use of numerous police officers from other reserves and forces and suggested he was trying to secure too much private power.

Continued confrontation over these issues resulted in violence. Gabriel's residence was burned in January 2004. He and his family left the reserve for their safety. Numerous protesters were prosecuted in the aftermath of the violence.

Harding was a key figure in Gabriel's eventual removal as grand chief by the tribal council. He has denied Gabriel's claims that many of his opponents were part of a criminal class. Harding and supporters opposed the appointment of an interim police chief, Ed Thompson. In April 2004 they established some traditional Peacekeepers to monitor the highway running through the settlement.

In 2005, both Gabriel and Harding lost their bids for re-election as chiefs. Steven Bonspille was elected as grand chief that year. A slate of six Gabriel supporters was elected to the chiefs' council, and all were new members.
