= James Gabriel (politician) =

Canadian politician and Indigenous chief

James Gabriel (Mohawk) is a politician, a former chief of Kanesatake, a First Nations settlement within the boundaries of the city of Oka, Quebec. He was elected three times as Grand Chief, serving from 1995 to 2004. His tenure in office was controversial, marked by bitter divisions between his supporters and opponents that resulted in violence in January 2004.

== Early life and education ==
James Gabriel was born to a European-Canadian mother and Mohawk father. Under the matrilineal kinship system at Kanesatake, children are traditionally considered to be born into the mother's clan, so Gabriel did not have a formal kinship relationship through his mother with the community. He grew up at Kanesatake, and both he and his father are registered as members of the community. He grew up bilingual in French and English. (In a 2004 article, Benoit Aubin suggested that such differences between maternal ancestries was part of the divide in the Nation between modernists like Gabriel and traditionalists like Steven Bonspille, John Harding (Sha ko hen the tha), and Pearl Bonspille, his opponents on the chiefs' council in the early 2000s, after he was re-elected as Grand Chief.)

== Cultural context ==
In 1991, following the lengthy Oka Crisis, which brought federal troops to the community, the 1700 members of Kanesatake changed their means of selecting leaders. Until then the people had continued their traditional selection of chiefs by clan mothers, from those persons with hereditary rights to the position. Inheritance and property was passed through the maternal line. Clan mothers could remove chiefs of whom they disapproved.

In 1991, the Nation conducted its first popular elections to choose persons as chiefs for the six-person council and as Grand Chief. Jerry Peltier was the first to be popularly elected as Grand Chief. A number of issues have increased political competition in the community.

== Career ==
Gabriel became active in tribal politics during and after the Oka crisis. He was first elected as grand chief in 1995, succeeding Peltier. He was elected three times, serving into 2004. By his last term in office, the six-person chiefs' council was evenly split among opponents and supporters.

Gabriel was concerned that increases in the sales of contraband cigarettes, were becoming an avenue of the drug trade and organized crime in Kanesatake. In an interview he said, "When tax rollbacks killed the cigarette trade, they recycled into booze, drugs, weapons, illegal immigrants, anything with a cash value."

Critics suggest he and supporters unjustly branded several community members as criminals. Gabriel agreed with the Royal Canadian Mounted Police (RCMP) that the community's tobacco stores (in which contraband cigarettes of disputed origin were sold tax-free to non-natives) should be removed from the community. Opposing council members and community members, largely traditionalists, disputed this conclusion, as well as other positions of Gabriel.

In a 2001 referendum, 61% of Kanesatake voters approved removal of Gabriel from office. He kept his position following a court's ruling in his favor, which determined that the referendum was not the means to end his tenure. The reasons for Gabriel's unpopularity in this period are disputed. His supporters in 2003-04 claim that he lost popularity by not adequately confronting organized crime, while his opponents claim his unpopularity resulted from his promotion of bill S-24 (see below), which changed conditions for the settlement in relation to other levels of government.

=== Outsourcing control of finances ===
In 2002, Gabriel allowed the federal government to hire the private firm of PriceWaterhouseCoopers to audit and assume control over the band's finances. (He claimed the decision was necessary in light of the $1.2 million deficit). Numerous questions were raised by a later audit, but accusations that Gabriel had defrauded the community were not supported.

== Policing and conflict ==
In late 2003, Gabriel arranged with Canada's Indian Affairs Department for an emergency loan of $900,000 to the community's police force. He secretly hired aboriginal policemen from other reserves as special forces for an anti-crime, drug raid. Opponents believed Gabriel intended to use these officers against the local cigarette dealers. (He informed his supporters on the band council about the planned actions, but not the three council members who opposed him.)

On January 12, 2004, Gabriel bypassed the Kanesatake Police Commission and led a force of 67 police officers to the local police station to take control. (The community's police chief, Tracy Cross, was not a supporter of Gabriel and opposed these actions). Many local residents resisted this effort, and a standoff resulted, with 200 people surrounding the station and hired forces inside.

Gabriel's allies requested assistance from the Sûreté du Québec (SQ). In 1990 the provincial police had been involved in the prolonged 78-day Oka standoff and were not eager to return to this First Nation's internal politics. Fearing renewed violence, the provincial authorities refused to send in the SQ. They negotiated an agreement by which the private forces were given safe passage out of the community. On the same night, Gabriel's house and car were burned down but no one was there or injured. Other protests and violence broke out across the community. The grand chief took his family to safety in the neighbouring community of Laval.

Disputes continued through 2004 over the leadership of the Kanesatake police force. An interim director was appointed but his power was limited to Mohawk who lived outside Kanesatake in nearby Oka. Leadership of the police was contested. Gabriel's status in the community was a matter of controversy in 2004-05. Some believe he was legitimately removed as Grand Chief in January 2004, while others (in and out of the community) rejected this interpretation.

In early June 2005 the Sûreté du Québec Command testified to their understanding that the tobacco/drug raid was intended to replace both Police Chief Cross and the Police Commission. The S.Q. and RCMP Command had both argued with Gabriel against conducting the raid. They testified that it was poorly planned and that Gabriel relied on dubious evidence in his decisionmaking.

Gabriel was defeated for the position of grand chief by opponent Steven Bonspille in the June 26, 2005 elections, losing with 344 votes to Bonspille's 375. The six band council chiefs elected were a slate of Gabriel supporters, and resulted in a new council. Their political differences resulted in difficult governance. He declined to run for re-election after his first term.

Some aboriginal groups in Canada, including the powerful Assembly of First Nations, have openly sided with Gabriel in this dispute, as has the Parti Québécois. Gabriel's supporters believe that the provincial government capitulated to organized crime at Kanesatake in early 2004 by allowing him to be driven from the community. His opponents argue that his rule over the community was heavy-handed and arbitrary. They said his efforts to stop the contraband cigarette trade were an intrusion into accepted community practices.

== S-24 ==
Gabriel helped to negotiate the passage of S-24, a federal bill which, according to its backers, was meant to clarify the Kanesatake community's relationship to the federal government. Because Kanesatake is not a "reserve" but a "settlement", it has not been subject to the provisions of Canada's Indian Act. Opponents of S-24 believe that the bill was intended to reduce the community's autonomy.

A community referendum narrowly passed the bill by two votes. Many residents boycotted the electoral process entirely. Some believed Gabriel intended to convert Kanesatake into a municipality under Canada law. Such action would have increased the powers of the federal and provincial governments over the community.
