= Tommy Prince =

Native Canadian soldier

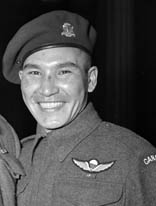
- Prince in 1945
- Born: October 25, 1915; Petersfield, Manitoba, Canada
- Died: November 25, 1977 (aged 62); Winnipeg, Manitoba, Canada
- Relatives: Peguis (great-grandfather); Mis-koo-kenew ("Red Eagle") (grandfather)
- Military career
- Allegiance: Canada
- Branch: Canadian Army
- Service years: 1940–1945; 1950–1954
- Rank: Sergeant
- Nicknames: Prince of the Brigade; Legend of Kapyong
- Conflicts: World War II; Italian Campaign Bernhard Line Monte Majo Battle of Anzio Liberation of Rome; Operation Dragoon (France); Korean War; Operation Ripper; Battle of Maehwa-san; Operation Rugged and Operation Dauntless; Battle of Kapyong; Second Battle of the Hook
- Awards: Military Medal; Mentioned in Despatches; Silver Star (United States); National Historic Person

Thomas George Prince, MM (October 25, 1915 – November 25, 1977) was an Indigenous Canadian war hero and the most decorated soldier in the First Special Service Force or Devil's Brigade, an elite American-Canadian commando unit, during World War II. He is Canada's most decorated First Nations soldier, serving in World War II and the Korean War. Prince was one of only three Canadians to receive both the Canadian Military Medal and the American Silver Star during World War II. Prince's military deeds as a scout and as a forward combatant were unique and of major strategic importance. He has been described as "perhaps Canada's greatest soldier".

Prince was descended from chiefs of the Peguis First Nation (Saulteux or Ojibwe). Prince's grandfather had negotiated treaty rights in Manitoba with representatives of The Crown. Prince himself would also represent First Nations concerns in Ottawa as Chairman of both the Manitoba Indian Association (currently Assembly of Manitoba Chiefs) and the First Nations of Canada national delegation. He advocated for the abolition of the governing Indian Act in Canada and proposed respect for the traditional Crown treaties as the basis of First Nations rights. Prince's position, although considered radical at the time, has been vindicated in subsequent decades by Supreme Court of Canada rulings in support of the Crown treaties and is now accepted as government policy.

== Early life ==
Prince was born on 25 October 1915 in Petersfield, Manitoba. His family moved to the Brokenhead Ojibwe Nation, near present-day Scanterbury, Manitoba, in 1921. He was the son of Henry George Prince (1877-1944), a chief of the Saulteaux Peguis First Nation, and Arabella Louisa Chief (1883-1978), and was one of eleven children in the family.

Prince was a great-grandson of the Saulteaux leader Peguis, who, as a very young chief, in 1797 led his people on a long migration from the Sault Ste. Marie region west toward the Red River and Lake Winnipeg area. Peguis, who lived until 1864, pledged loyalty to the British Crown during the War of 1812. In 1817 he signed the first treaty (Selkirk Treaty) with Lord Selkirk, who was a principal owner of the Hudson's Bay Company, granting land along the Red River to the Selkirk settlers.

Prince's grandfather, Chief Henry Prince, also known as Mis-koo-kenew ("Red Eagle"), was a son of Peguis and served as a principal negotiator and signatory of Treaty 1 at Lower Fort Garry in 1871.

Prince attended the Elkhorn Residential School in Elkhorn, Manitoba, where he completed Grade 8 and studied agricultural science and machinery. The school was part of Canada's residential school system, a network of government-funded, church-run institutions.

In the early 1930s, during the height of the Great Depression, Prince aspired to become a lawyer, but his family experienced serious financial hardship. At the age of sixteen he left school and began working, taking a variety of manual labour jobs, most often working as a tree feller.

== Warrior tradition ==
Prince grew up in a family and community where military service and warrior traditions were intrinsic and historic. Members of his extended family had taken part in earlier conflicts involving British and Canadian forces. His grandfather, Chief Henry Prince, had led the Peguis First Nation to serve on the Crown’s side during the Red River Rebellion of 1870, and a relative, Chief William Prince, a first cousin of Prince’s father, had led the Nile Expedition Voyageurs during the British relief expedition sent to assist General Charles Gordon at the Siege of Khartoum. During the First World War, other members of the Prince family served overseas with Canadian forces in France.

Prince was also shaped by the traditions of his Ojibwe community. Ojibwe and Algonquian warrior traditions emphasized stealth, patience, and individual skill in combat. Rather than relying primarily on large formations, warriors often depended on careful observation, quiet movement, and surprise.

Prince learned many of these skills early in life. Growing up at Brokenhead Ojibway Nation near the eastern shore of Lake Winnipeg, he spent much of his childhood hunting and travelling through the forests and wetlands surrounding the community. These experiences helped him develop strong abilities in tracking, stealth, and survival.

His father also taught him marksmanship. Prince later recalled that he could place five bullets through a target the size of a playing card at a distance of about 100 m (330 ft).

Some of Prince's actions during the war were later compared to the traditional practice of counting coup, in which a warrior demonstrated bravery by approaching or touching an enemy without causing harm, sometimes when the enemy was asleep. Such actions were intended to shake up and frighten an enemy and avoid serious combat. Fellow soldiers later described occasions when Prince entered enemy positions at night and left messages or removed equipment to show that he had been there undetected.

== World War II ==
=== Enlistment ===
As a teenager in the early 1930s, Prince joined the Royal Canadian Army Cadets, where he developed an interest in military life and discipline. He later recalled, "As soon as I put my uniform on, I felt like a better man. I even tried to wear it to class."

When the Second World War began on 1 September 1939, thousands of First Nations men volunteered for service in the Canadian armed forces. Historians estimate that more than 3,000 Status First Nations men served during the war. Given that the total Status First Nations population in Canada at the time was fewer than 100,000 people, this represented a significant proportion of the adult male population.

Prince attempted to enlist in the Canadian Army several times but was rejected during the recruitment process. Indigenous applicants sometimes faced barriers to enlistment, including discrimination from recruiters, and they were not subject to any conscription or required to serve in a military capacity.

Prince persisted and was eventually accepted into the Canadian Army in June 1940, at a crisis point in the war when the British and Canadian forces had suffered catastrophic defeat in the Fall of France.

=== Early service in Britain ===
Prince was immediately sent overseas to Britain in June 1940. He served with the Royal Canadian Engineers and trained as a sapper. Sappers were combat engineers responsible for tasks such as building bridges, clearing obstacles, and placing explosives during military operations.

Much of the work assigned to Canadian engineers in Britain involved construction projects, maintenance of defensive positions, and training exercises rather than front-line combat. For many soldiers the early years of the war were marked by routine work and long periods of waiting. Prince reportedly grew restless with these duties and later remarked that he had not enlisted simply to "drink tea" in England. In February 1941 he was promoted to lance corporal.

Outside his regular duties Prince took part in army athletics, particularly running and boxing. These competitions were common among troops stationed in Britain and helped maintain morale and physical fitness. Prince proved both strong and fast, and the endurance he developed through athletics later proved valuable during commando training.

=== Secret recruitment and selection ===
In July 1942, Prince volunteered for the 2nd Canadian Parachute Battalion. This designation was used to disguise the true reason for the recruitment of parachute volunteers in the UK at that time: the United States and Canada had begun the formation of a special force to conduct secret sabotage and raids against German deuterium plants or heavy water production being used in atomic weapons research in German-occupied Norway. Men were recruited in Canada and in the overseas Canadian Army in Britain for this unit.

Prince reported to the parachute training school at RAF Ringway near Manchester, UK, one of the main airborne training centres used by Allied forces. The course was physically demanding and the selection process was strict. Of the one hundred volunteers who began the program, only nine were chosen to continue.

=== Formation of the First Special Service Force ===
In September 1942 Prince returned to North America and travelled to Fort Benning, Georgia, where he joined a new joint American–Canadian commando formation that was being organized in secrecy. The unit would become known as the First Special Service Force (FSSF), later nicknamed the "Devil's Brigade".

Because of the secrecy surrounding the project, Prince and the other volunteers were transported by train to a remote training camp near Helena, Montana. The train windows were blacked out so that the soldiers could not see their destination.

The Force eventually numbered 1,800 men, divided equally between American and Canadian volunteers. It was commanded by Lieutenant Colonel Robert T. Frederick, the American officer who had overseen its creation and developed its unconventional operational doctrine.

Prince was among the Canadian soldiers selected for the unit because of his physical ability and fieldcraft, qualities considered essential for the demanding reconnaissance and commando missions the Force was expected to undertake.

=== Training and reconnaissance role ===
At the Helena training camp Prince underwent the intensive preparation designed for the Force. The program included instruction in demolition and explosives, stealth reconnaissance, hand-to-hand combat, amphibious operations, mountain warfare, rock climbing, and skiing. Members of the Force were also trained to operate and disassemble German weapons so that captured equipment could be used during combat if necessary.

Prince quickly distinguished himself during this training. Because of his endurance, stealth, and experience moving through difficult terrain, he was assigned the role of reconnaissance scout within the Force. Scouts operated ahead of the main unit to observe enemy positions, report on troop movements, and identify routes for attacks.

These assignments often required scouts to work in very small teams or alone deep behind enemy lines. The work demanded patience, careful observation, and the ability to move without detection—skills Prince had developed earlier in life while hunting and travelling through the forests around Lake Winnipeg.

=== Italy campaign and reconnaissance combat missions ===
==== Winter Line operations ====
In late 1943, Prince and the Force were finally deployed in combat. The unit had originally been created for sabotage missions against German heavy water facilities in German-occupied Norway. Before the Force could be sent there, however, Norwegian commandos destroyed the targets. With the original mission cancelled, the unit considered the possibility of disbandment. To preserve the unit, into which a major investment of training had been expended, Frederick proposed that the Force be used in front-line combat operations against the Japanese.

Prince and the other soldiers were first sent to the Aleutian Islands in Alaska for possible action against Japanese forces. By the time they arrived, however, the Japanese had already withdrawn, and no combat operations were executed. Soon afterward the unit received a new assignment.

Allied forces fighting in Italy were struggling to break through the German defensive system known as the Winter Line. This chain of fortified mountain positions stretched across central Italy and blocked the Allied advance toward Rome. The terrain was steep, rocky, and heavily defended, and earlier assaults had resulted in heavy casualties with little progress.

In November 1943 the Force was transferred to Italy to assist in attacks on some of the most difficult positions along the line. The rugged mountains south of Monte Cassino were exactly the kind of terrain for which the unit had trained.

==== Reconnaissance missions ====
The Force established a base near Santa Maria, well north of Naples and close to the front lines at Monte Cassino. From there reconnaissance patrols moved out regularly into German-held territory.

Prince soon gained a reputation within the unit as one of its most capable reconnaissance scouts. His assignments often required him to cross enemy lines at night to observe German positions and report on troop movements.

During these patrols Prince wore traditional Ojibwe moccasins instead of standard military boots. The softer footwear allowed him to move quietly across rocky ground where heavier boots would have made noise.

His ability to approach and enter enemy sleeping positions without being detected soon drew the attention of his commanders. Lieutenant Colonel Tom Gilday, who commanded Prince's battalion, began assigning him particularly demanding reconnaissance and combat missions that required patience, stealth, and exceptional fieldcraft.

=== Monte Majo ===
Monte Majo and Monte la Difensa were the critical twin mountain peaks which anchored the German defensive lines in Italy. The Force managed to succeed in the Battle of Monte La Difensa on 3 to 9 December 1943 by scaling a steep cliff at night and attacking the German forces on the summit. The other principal objective planned for early January 1944 was the taking of Monte Majo, which was assigned to Prince's contingent of the Devil's Brigade, and was a formidable challenge. German artillery and machine-gun emplacements had been arranged in layers on the steep slopes. An attack on any one of them would alert the other defenses and also the main German positions on the summit. Any assaulting force would be met with intensive and effective fire.

Gilday, desperate to devise some strategy for the assault, assigned Prince to lead a patrol and move at night in an attempt to create a pathway for an assault on Monte Majo by eliminating the enemy gun emplacements on the lower and middle slopes of Monte Majo blocking the intended route. This would require Prince to execute his orders without making any sound or arousing the other German positions. If Prince's mission succeeded, it would allow an assault by the Force to follow immediately and climb up the steep mountain side. The offensive was planned for 8 January 1944.

The commanding officer for the attack on Monte Majo, Captain Mark Radcliffe, remarked that Prince "moved just like a shadow" as he led his patrol away from the forward outpost into the night. Under cover of darkness, Prince led his patrol partway up the lower slopes to a position where he left his men behind as a supporting group, should they be needed to provide covering fire. Prince then single-handedly approached and entered the successive German gun emplacements one after another, commencing with the gun pits on the lower slopes and then proceeding with the higher emplacements on the middle slopes. He successfully dispatched all of the gunners and soldiers in the artillery and machine gun bunkers with complete silence and without eliciting any enemy alarms or defensive fire. Prince then returned with his patrol to Radcliffe's forward post before dawn and reported that his mission was accomplished. All of the German gun pits located on the intended route of the Force's assault at the base and the middle of Monte Majo had been neutralized, with only the German positions on the summit remaining to defend the mountain.

When the Force commenced their movement up the slopes of Monte Majo, they passed by the now silent German machine gun and artillery bunkers, and Radcliffe became aware that Prince had done "a beautiful job". Radcliffe never learned the exact details of how Prince had managed to accomplish this stunning result, beyond the fact that Prince had entered the gun emplacements and had then eliminated the gun platoons. Radcliffe's company leading the attack was able to ascend to the summit of Monte Majo without firing a single bullet. According to an interview with Radcliffe, “We were...ordered to attack Monte Majo. There was no cover, just a bald hill. I sent scouts forward to take out the German machine gun positions. The Germans didn’t even know we were on them, the attack was that well executed.” By 05:30 the last enemy positions were overrun. Prince's silent mission had enabled the daring assault by the Brigade on Monte Majo to proceed, the enemy taken by complete surprise.

Once in control of the summit, the Force made use of captured German heavy machine guns which had been abandoned during the enemy retreat to repel a long series of fierce German counter-attacks over a period of several days. The distinctive sound of the German heavy guns were identified by the German counter-assault soldiers, who would shout out in confusion to the Force soldiers holding the summit, in German, "Stop shooting at us! We are Germans!" Prince would also be involved in these later actions to defend the summit against counter-attack. Following the taking of Monte Majo and the intense battle in defence of the position, the Force had been reduced from 1,800 men at the start of the winter campaign to only 400 as a result of casualties.

The Force was awarded the Battle Honour "Mount Majo" for this action by both the U.S. and Canadian governments. Prince did not receive any individual award or medal for his unparalleled and essential contribution to the successful outcome. Prince's special skills and acts of stealth at Monte Majo would have been regarded as classified information related to a secret mission. The nature of Prince's assignment at Monte Majo could not have been described in a medal nomination or citation without compromising the security of further operations. In recent years, special operations soldiers are often awarded high decorations in secret, but are not awarded the highest decorations to avoid public exposure. The Force, a unit in which heroic acts were commonplace, earned many unit awards which were shared by the entire Brigade, but comparatively infrequently awarded individual medals to its men. Prince's accomplishments at Monte Majo were of singular status which surpassed the range of any existing medal, including the Distinguished Conduct Medal or the Victoria Cross.

In November, 2019, a Bravery In Arms documentary was produced of the Force assault on Monte Majo. In the documentary, Prince's accomplishment was described while showing the actual location of the battle.

=== Anzio ===
After breaking through the German Bernhard Line, the Force was then moved to Anzio, where a U.S. and Allied landing had been contained and was heavily under attack. The Force, now comprising about 1,200 men, was tasked with holding several miles of perimeter against a full German division.

On 5 February 1944, near Littoria, Prince was sent forward by Gilday to report the location of several German assembly points, including artillery positions. When Prince failed to return the following day, Gilday feared that he had been killed or captured by the Germans. However, Prince suddenly emerged from the darkness into Gilday's post two nights later and reported to Gilday how he had found a deserted farm house close to major German gun positions. With Prince still observing from inside the farmhouse, German patrols had then arrived and occupied the house. Prince had managed to elude the Germans searching the house without being discovered and had then hid in the attic for another day until the Germans left.

The following night after this report, Prince was sent back by Gilday to the same farmhouse bearing thousands of feet of communications wire. From the abandoned farmhouse about 200 metres (660 ft) from the enemy assembly area, he could report the location of their gun emplacements using 1,400 metres (4,600 ft) of telephone wire. The next day, an artillery duel developed as the Allies attempted to knock out the guns reported by Prince, and one of these rounds cut the telephone wire. Prince discovered some farmer's clothes in a closet in the house, found some tools in the farm shed, and walked out dressed as a farmer weeding the crops. Locating the damaged wires, he rejoined them while pretending to tie his shoelaces. He made a show of shaking his fist at the nearby Germans, then again toward the Allied lines. Returning to his lookout spot he continued his reports, and over the next 24 hours four German batteries were knocked out of action. In all he spent three days behind enemy lines.

When Prince returned to the Force positions and made his report, Gilday asked Prince about the identity of the Italian farmer who had been observed near his position. When Prince replied that it was himself in disguise, Gilday pointed out to Prince that if he had been apprehended by the Germans while in the peasant clothes, he would have been executed as a spy.

For this action he was awarded the Military Medal, his citation reading (in part) "Sergeant Prince's courage and utter disregard for personal safety were an inspiration to his fellows and a marked credit to his unit." Gilday's decision to recommend Prince for this medal immediately launched the reputation of Prince among the soldiers in the Force as well as in other Allied units.

During the Anzio campaign, Prince would change his boots and don moccasins which he carried in his backpack whenever requiring silent movement. He would reportedly sneak past German security guards at night and enter enemy sleeping locations, leaving messages or warnings, stealing boots, and sometimes using his knife to dispatch an enemy soldier. These psychological warfare attacks earned the nickname of "Geist" ("ghost" in English) or "Teufel" ("devil" or "demon" in English) from the German soldiers.

Prince would also maintain a regular sniping schedule at Anzio, under his own initiative. He would venture out at night into no-man's land between the opposing armies, choose a hidden vantage point, and target any German who wandered within his sights.

On one occasion he went searching for a German sniper who had been targeting the Force positions. The two ace snipers exchanged fire in a personal duel, with Prince eventually shooting the German who fell dead from a tree.

Before long, the German division opposing the 1st Special Service Force had retreated nearly two and a half miles away from direct contact, apparently shaken by the night activity of the Devil's Brigade.

=== France ===
After being the vanguard of the US forces liberating Rome on 4 June 1944, the Force was moved to southern France as part of Operation Dragoon. First they would assault the Hyères Islands before going ashore at Sylvabelle on the French Riviera. There the force was ordered, as part of the 1st Airborne Task Force, to push eastward toward the Franco-Italian border.

On 1 September Prince and a private were sent forward through the German lines to scout the enemy positions near L'Escarène and came across an encampment area of an enemy reserve battalion. Prince conducted a detailed observation of this German battalion at close quarters using natural foliage as a cover. He avoided being detected by the enemy.

On the way back to report this discovery, Prince and the private came upon a battle between some German platoons and a squad of French partisans. Prince, an expert sniper, and the private started sniping the Germans from behind, killing about 12 of them and wounding many others, and the startled Germans eventually withdrew. Prince made contact with the French leader, who asked Prince where the rest of his company was located. When Prince pointed to the private and said "Here," the French commander exclaimed that he had thought there were about 50 men involved in his relief. The French commander recommended Prince for the Croix de Guerre, but the courier was killed en route and the message never reached the French Commander-in-Chief, Charles de Gaulle.

Prince continued on and penetrated the German lines to rejoin the Force positions. He then led it back to the encampment of the German reserve forces and, together with the French squad of resistance fighters which Prince had rescued, joined in the battle which was on 5 September. As a result, the entire German battalion of about 1,000 men was killed or captured. From start to end Prince had been without food, water or sleep for 72 hours and had walked over 70 km across rugged, mountainous terrain. Afterwards he was recommended for the American Silver Star, his citation reading:

So accurate was the report rendered by the patrol that Sergeant Prince's regiment moved forward on 5 September 1944, occupied new heights and successfully wiped out the enemy bivouac [encampment] area. The keen sense of responsibility and devotion to duty displayed by Sergeant Prince is in keeping with the highest traditions of the military service and reflects great credit upon himself and the Armed Forces of the Allied Nations.

With the severe reduction in the number of highly trained original Force soldiers due to combat and their replacement by untrained men, General Frederick determined that both US and Canadian personnel would be better suited if they were dispersed to units in their own forces. The Force was disbanded in December 1944.

== Between wars ==
=== Returning home ===
Prince was honourably discharged from the Canadian Army on 15 June 1945 after more than five years of military service, including combat operations in Italy and southern France with the Force. He returned to his home community on the Brokenhead Reserve in Manitoba as the most decorated Indigenous soldier to have served in the war.

Prince was one of eleven children. During Prince's wartime service his father died, leaving the family without its patriarch. Shortly after returning home Prince also separated from his first wife.

Like many returning veterans, Prince sought work soon after arriving home. He found employment cutting pulpwood in the forests near Brokenhead, part of the logging economy that supplied timber operations along the eastern side of Lake Winnipeg. The work was physically demanding but familiar, drawing on seasonal labour patterns long established in the region.

In 1946, Prince was involved in a violent altercation at a dance in the Brokenhead area. During the incident a woman struck him with a broken beer bottle, cutting his cheek so severely that the wound required 64 stitches. The episode proved to be a turning point in his life. Soon afterward, Prince left the reserve and moved to Winnipeg, joining a growing number of First Nations veterans who relocated to urban centres in the years following the war.

Although he now lived off reserve, Prince remained legally classified as a "Treaty Indian" under the Indian Act. The designation meant that many aspects of his political and economic life continued to be governed by federal policy administered through the Department of Indian Affairs. First Nations people did not yet have full voting rights in federal elections, and the legal framework of the Act regulated land ownership, band administration, and other aspects of community life.

For many Indigenous veterans across Canada the contrast could be striking. During the war they had served alongside other soldiers in units where rank and ability determined their responsibilities. Returning home, they encountered a legal system that continued to treat First Nations communities as wards of the federal government.

=== Business ===
In Winnipeg, Prince attempted to establish himself economically in civilian life. Because he was no longer residing on the Brokenhead Reserve, he became eligible to apply for certain postwar assistance programs administered by the Department of Veterans Affairs. These programs were intended to help returning soldiers establish themselves through training, employment, or small business ventures.

Prince used this support to start a small cleaning service in Winnipeg. The enterprise appears to have operated on a modest scale but initially proved successful, providing him with a measure of financial independence during the early postwar years. For a man who had recently served in one of the Allied armies' most elite units and had commanded dangerous reconnaissance and combat missions behind enemy lines, the work represented a stark shift from the responsibilities and recognition he had held during the war.

The business collapsed while Prince was away from the city participating in political meetings in Ottawa concerning the Indian Act. During his absence he entrusted the day-to-day operation of the company to his employees in Winnipeg. According to later accounts, the truck used by the business was wrecked and dismantled, its parts sold for scrap. The equipment and supplies were also sold, and the money was not returned to Prince.

When he returned to Winnipeg, Prince discovered that the enterprise he had built had effectively disappeared. The loss wiped out the economic foundation he had begun to establish after the war.

With the business gone, Prince returned to manual labour. Like many working-class men in Manitoba at the time, he found employment working in lumber camps and later in a concrete factory in order to support himself.

Prince later reflected that many Indigenous veterans returned from the war to find themselves treated as "just another Indian again", a sharp contrast to the status they had held while serving overseas.

=== 1946 parliamentary hearings on the Indian Act ===
About a year after returning from the war, Prince emerged as a political representative for First Nations communities in Canada. In 1946, he was elected vice-president of the Manitoba Indian Association, an organization representing First Nations communities in the province and advocating political reform. The organization later evolved into the Assembly of Manitoba Chiefs.

Later that year Prince was selected to chair the national First Nations delegation appearing before a joint committee of the Senate of Canada and the House of Commons of Canada. The parliamentary committee had been established to review the Indian Act and consider reforms to federal policies governing First Nations peoples.

As chairman of the delegation, Prince travelled across Canada consulting with First Nations organizations and community leaders to gather concerns that would be presented during the hearings in Ottawa. Appearing before Parliament only a year after returning from the battlefields of Italy and France, he represented First Nations communities, which were at this time subject to the legal and administrative authority of the Indian Act.

During the hearings Prince argued that the Indian Act had created a paternalistic system in which the federal government exercised extensive control over First Nations land, resources and mineral leasing, and governance through the Department of Indian Affairs. He advocated the abolition of the Act and proposed that relations between First Nations and the Canadian state should instead be based on the historic treaties negotiated between Indigenous nations and the Crown.

The issue carried personal significance for Prince. His grandfather, Chief Henry Prince, had been a principal negotiator and signatory of Treaty 1 in 1871. By invoking those agreements during the hearings, Prince connected the contemporary political demands of First Nations communities with the original treaty framework that had structured relations between Indigenous nations and the Canadian government.

Although the parliamentary review eventually produced several revisions to the Indian Act, removing some of the more offensive and outdated provisions, it did not result in the broader reforms and fundamental restructuring that Prince and other First Nations representatives had sought.

In the Parliamentary deliberations with respect to the Indian Act and possible amendments, Prince made a positive and powerful impression during the committee meetings, his arguments cogent and well-organized. Government officials considered offering him a position with the Department of Indian Affairs. However, Prince's opposition to the Indian Act was in conflict with government policy, and in the end, no job offer eventuated. In later decades, the Canadian government would come to accept a policy of eventually phasing out the Indian Act, while at the same time affirming the traditional First Nations treaty rights as supported by Supreme Court of Canada rulings. These later developments would constitute belated vindication of Prince's position on the issues.

=== Continued advocacy ===
After the parliamentary hearings Prince returned to Winnipeg and continued his work with the Manitoba Indian Association while supporting himself through manual labour. Despite the economic challenges he faced during these years, he remained active in political advocacy and community affairs.

Prince frequently acted as an intermediary for First Nations communities dealing with government authorities. In one instance he intervened on behalf of a First Nations community in northern Manitoba that faced legal action under provincial hunting regulations. Acting as a representative, he interceded for them with the Government of Manitoba and resolved the dispute.

Through these activities Prince developed a reputation not only as a decorated soldier but also as an advocate for Indigenous rights during a period when First Nations political organizations were beginning to press more forcefully for reform of federal policy in Canada.

== Korean War ==
=== Re-enlistment in the Princess Patricia's Canadian Light Infantry ===
In August 1950, Prince re-enlisted in the Canadian Army to serve with United Nations Command forces during the Korean War. Explaining his decision to return to military service, Prince later remarked that he felt he "owed something to my friends who died" during the Second World War. Reinstated at his previous rank of Sergeant, Prince joined the 2nd Battalion, Princess Patricia's Canadian Light Infantry (2 PPCLI), the first Canadian infantry battalion deployed to Korea as part of the United Nations force resisting North Korean and later Chinese offensives on the Korean Peninsula.

=== Battle of Maehwa-san and Operations Rugged and Dauntless ===
In February 1951 the Patricia's joined the 27th British Commonwealth Brigade on the battlefield. In late March, the 2 PPCLI commenced Operations Rugged and Dauntless to push the enemy north of the 38th Parallel. Prince was sergeant and second in command of his rifle platoon, and he soon resumed his special form of stealth missions. Shortly after his arrival on the battlefield he selected, trained and led an eight-man night "snatch patrol" into an enemy encampment under cover of darkness and with silent movements. The successful mission returned with two captured heavy machine guns taken from a position which had been heavily defended by Chinese soldiers. After seizing the guns, Prince and his men returned to the Canadian lines without alerting or arousing the enemy. The stealth tactics devised by Prince and executed by his special team resulted in the complete elimination of a strong Chinese defensive position in total silence, without firing any shots, while Prince and his force sustained no casualties. Prince went on to lead his special force on several more successful nocturnal demoralization raids against Chinese forces, again with the complete neutralization of enemy positions accomplished without the loss of any casualties by Prince's assaulting force. In 2022, a 2 PPCLI Korean War veteran credited Prince with saving his life due to the special training which Prince had given him.

Although his company commanding officer was aware of Prince's renown as a nocturnal operative, the company CO was unfamiliar with and professed shock at Prince's bold methods of operation. Eventually the CO began to assign Prince to lead fewer patrols because he objected that they contained too many risks which could threaten the lives of the soldiers. However, the soldiers of the platoon were impressed with Prince's battlefield skills and were supportive of Prince in this disagreement. One military historian later concluded that there existed some jealousy between the officers and Prince because the men of the company respected Prince's fighting ability and his reputation. Prince's company commanding officer declined to nominate him for any awards or medals for masterminding and leading the unparalleled and successful night raids on Chinese positions. Prince prepared his own report of the dispute and submitted it to Lt. Col. James Stone, the battalion commander.

=== Battle of Kapyong ===
Prince held a prominent role with the 2 PPCLI when it became the first Canadian unit awarded the United States Presidential Unit Citation for distinguished service in the Battle of Kapyong on 22–27 April 1951. The battalion defended an important strategic position on Hill 677 despite heavy assault from Chinese forces. The Kapyong Valley provided a potential route for the enemy to encircle the U.S. forces in Korea which were at that point in general retreat across the entire Korean front. The 2 PPCLI, consisting of about 700 infantrymen and some large mortars and machine guns, was opposed in the Kapyong River valley by a large Chinese force consisting of two divisions and about 20,000 soldiers. Supporting UN forces initially consisted of a Royal Australian Regiment infantry battalion, fifteen Sherman tanks from an American tank regiment, and two companies of U.S. artillery. However, the Australians were hurriedly withdrawn from the Kapyong battlefield after a fierce firefight with the attacking Chinese, who chased the Australians in hot pursuit. The American tanks came under heavy assault and retreated from the battlefield. Some of the American tanks fired upon the Canadians, wounding one man, before retreating from the battlefield. The two American artillery companies simply fled on foot without firing a single round, abandoning their big guns and mortars, equipment and 50 trucks loaded with ammunition to the enemy. The U.S. artillery companies hiked about ten miles to the east, apparently convinced that a major Chinese breakthrough was imminent at Kapyong. Neither the Australians nor the Americans notified the Canadian forces of their sudden retreat, which left the Canadians encircled and alone in a two-day siege to hold the key position.

Brigadier Burke, who commanded the 27th British Commonwealth Brigade, personally flew over the Canadian soldiers and shouted at them through a loudspeaker that they were now cut off and would receive no support. This action angered and unsettled the Canadian soldiers, who jeered Burke as he flew away. Prince was credited with steadying and motivating many of the nervous young Canadians who voiced a desire to run in the face of overwhelming odds of about 30 to 1. The Canadian battalion commander Lieutenant Colonel James Stone ordered his men to fight in a last stand with the words, "No retreat, no surrender."

The fighting was fierce and often hand-to-hand with bayonets, the Chinese gaining access to the summit of Hill 677 through the numerous ravines along the sides of the 2,000 ft. hill. Thousands of Chinese soldiers swarmed the Canadian positions, with the Canadians running low on ammunition. The Canadian unit would three times take shelter in their shallow trenches scraped from the rocky ground and call in supporting long-distance artillery fire from 4.5 miles (7.24 km) away targeted directly onto their own locations. The forward platoons of the 2 PPCLI were completely overrun by mass attacks of Chinese soldiers. The 2 PPCLI, with their ammunition and supplies exhausted, managed to repel the attacks and the Chinese divisions withdrew with enormous casualties of about 5,000 Chinese soldiers killed and many more wounded during the assaults on Hill 677. By contrast, the 2 PPCLI suffered 18 killed and 38 wounded. The Chinese leadership were not aware of how close to victory they had achieved against the Canadians, who were now without ammunition or supplies, and did not launch a final large-scale assault against the Canadian positions. Most of the enemy units withdrew on 25 April. Burke had been summarily removed from command while the battle was in progress and UN relief forces were sent to Hill 677 on 26 April.

=== Second Battle of the Hook ===
Prince's wartime duty was taking a toll on his body, and his knees were subject to painful swelling and premature arthritis. He was hospitalized after a medical examination in May 1951. He was later returned to Canada, despite his vigorous protest, and assigned to administrative duties where he served as a platoon sergeant at The Officer Candidate School Canadian Forces Base Borden in Ontario. Here his knees improved, so in March 1952 he volunteered for a second tour of duty in the Far East. He sailed for Korea that October with the 3rd Battalion PPCLI.

Though the battalion was officially still training in November 1952, when Chinese forces attacked a vital sector on the Sami-chon River known as "the Hook", 3 PPCLI was called to assist British UN forces in the Second Battle of the Hook to recover the exposed forward position. The Patricia's had five members killed in the daylight counter-attack, but were able to recapture the post by November 19. Prince was among the nine wounded in the battalion with shrapnel wounds to his legs, although he continued to fight until the outpost was retaken by Prince and his men. Prince refused evacuation for medical treatment, stating "I don't have time for that.", evidently unwilling to abandon his position at the outpost. He removed shrapnel from his legs with his bayonet by himself. Despite his wounds, he carried another wounded 3 PCCLI soldier on his back to the military medical station. Although he recovered from these wounds, he was hospitalized for several weeks in early 1953 for treatment on his knees. The armistice was signed during this period.

Following the Korean Armistice Agreement, he remained in the army, working as an instructor of new recruits in Winnipeg, Manitoba, until his honorable discharge on October 28, 1953. He continued to work at a personnel depot in Winnipeg until September 1954. He was granted a small military disability pension due to his injured knees.

== Later life ==
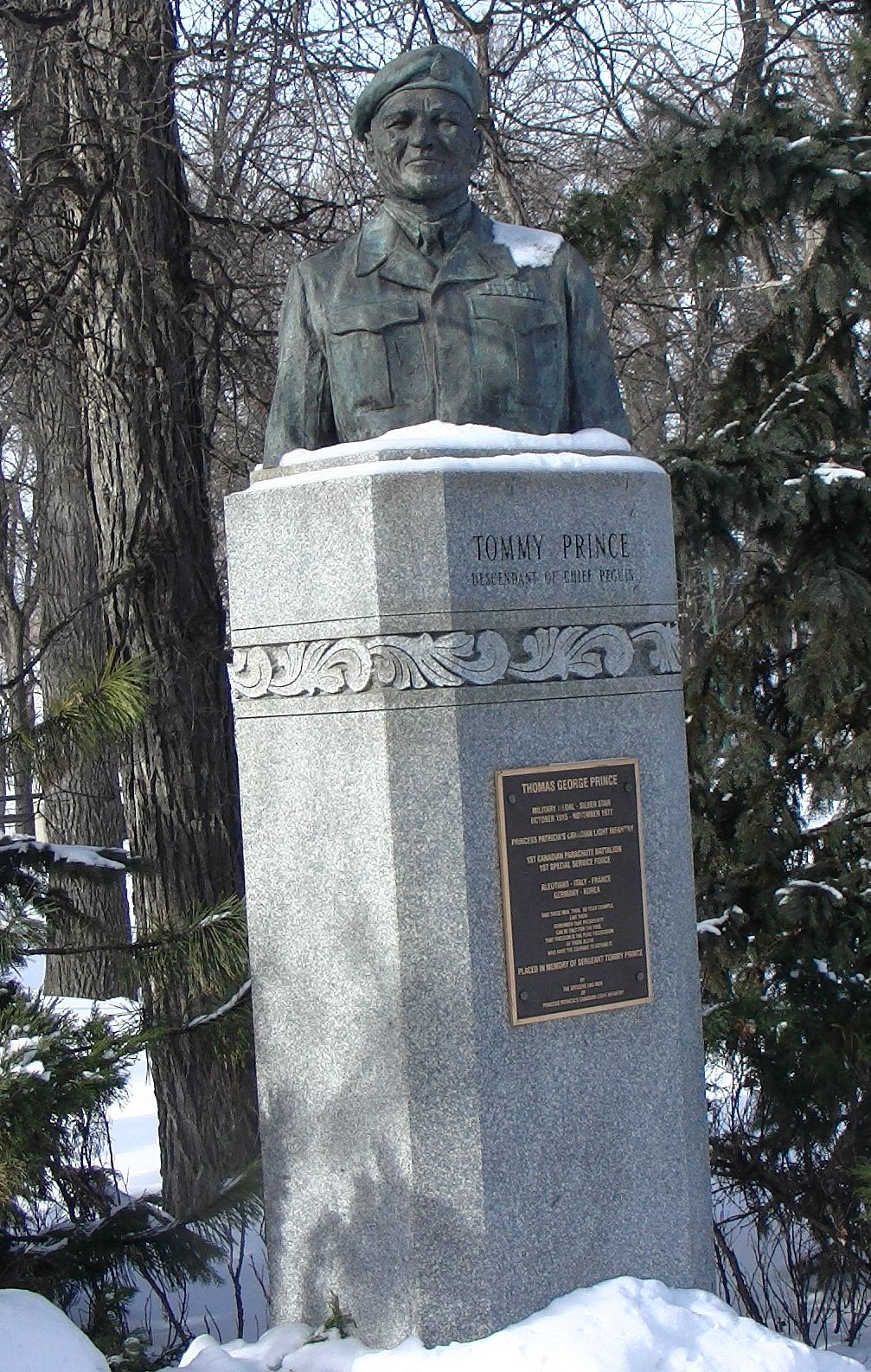
Monument to Tommy Prince, Kildonan Park, Winnipeg, just a few steps from the monument to his great-grandfather Peguis

=== Access to Government Programs ===
Adjusting to civilian life was not easy for Prince after World War II and Korea, and with painfully arthritic knees as a result of the long, harsh conditions during his military service, his capabilities were limited. Although he had been granted a small military disability pension due to his knee injuries, as a First Nations member he was unable to access other programs. Prince was effectively denied access to the special Canadian armed forces WWII veteran benefits programs, which included employment programs, educational support, land purchase grants, and supplementary income support programs. The information and application forms for these programs were available only at local Royal Canadian Legion branches, but First Nations members were forbidden entrance to Legion locations under the terms of the Indian Act, as alcohol was present. For this reason, Legion chapters maintained their own bylaws forbidding the presence of First Nations members. These bylaws were formally removed nation-wide in 1966, some 20 years after the end of WWII. The requirement by the government to access special war veterans programs solely through Legion premises, where First Nations veterans were forbidden entrance, appeared to those veterans to have been deliberately designed to exclude First Nations from participation.

=== Reduced circumstances ===
After his active military service ended in 1953, Prince married Verna Sinclair, with whom he had five children. At the same time, Prince found a permanent position at a Winnipeg ice cream factory. However, partly due to discrimination against First Nations members, Prince occasionally encountered hostility from his co-workers who were not aware of his military achievements. Prince never used his military record to promote his interests in civilian life, even with his own family and friends. Although the ice cream plant owner supported him, Prince eventually left the position, unable to tolerate the personal barbs. This occupational failure changed his personal outlook on society in general.

In June 1955 Prince made the news for his heroism in saving a man from drowning in the Red River at the Alexander Docks in Winnipeg, using an army "stranglehold" to drag the struggling, resisting man to safety. Afterwards he quietly walked away before the media could descend on the scene. However, a bystander had recognized him and gave Prince's name to the police and also to the newspapers. In an interview resulting from this, Prince explained his decision to intervene, "I knew how I'd have felt if I were in the water unable to swim and someone just stood looking at me, not doing a thing."

His life became increasingly difficult, ultimately ending in his estrangement from his family due to financial problems. Prince and his wife separated in 1964 and his children were placed in foster homes. The movement of his children to different foster homes over short periods of time made it difficult for him to keep in touch with them, although his daughter Beryl remained in one foster home and he visited her every month. Unlike other famous Canadian war heroes who also struggled in their civilian lives after the war ended, Prince was not assisted by well-off friends or offered positions by the government. His advocacy on behalf of First Nations and against the Indian Act had placed him as an opponent of prevailing government policies of the day.

He spiraled into a depression, and like many war veterans, he experienced post battle stress symptoms and combat nightmares which caused him to awaken in a sweat and in terror. His personal life continued to deteriorate with alcoholism and homelessness. Winnipeg police officers knew him personally and also of his heroic war service, and would refuse to hold him for intoxication or vagrancy, instead providing transport to a Salvation Army facility. Prince's son Tommy Prince Jr. and his girlfriend offered to accommodate his father at their own address, but Prince declined, not wanting to be a burden on his family. His final years were spent virtually alone, living in a Salvation Army hostel 6x8' (1.83 metres x 2.44 metres) room and subsisting on temporary employment such as janitorial labourer or a part-time security guard.

Through courage and perseverance, Prince eventually overcame his alcoholism and would later give coherent media interviews and reminiscences of his military deeds. In order to support himself, he sold off his war medals. Despite his straitened finances, Prince remained generous to others and would give cash to people whom he judged to be worse off than himself.

Prince would attend the annual Remembrance Day reunions with his PPCLI comrades-in-arms. Claude Petit, a former fellow soldier from the Korean War, later stated that he was aware of Prince's struggles. Petit believed that "someone should have done something...especially the regiment...he spent his life in there, that's all he knew."

On one occasion at night in 1976 on the Winnipeg streets, Prince was assaulted and beaten by a street gang who were unaware of his identity. Later, in another incident, he was stabbed by a young man who had mistaken him for another First Nations man whom he had been targeting. These serious acts of violence possibly contributed to Prince's demise the following year at the age of 62.

=== Provincial State Funeral ===
He died in 1977 at Winnipeg's Deer Lodge Centre, a health care facility specializing in geriatric care and treatment of veterans, and was interred in Brookside Cemetery, Winnipeg. Despite the reduced circumstances of his later years, he had retained his fame and he was given a provincial state funeral, a notable event with significant official representatives and more than 500 people in attendance. At his state funeral service, a delegation from the Princess Patricia's Brigade served as his pallbearers. A group of men from the Saulteaux nation sang the "Death of a Warrior" song while his body was lowered into the grave. The PPCLI officer in charge of the military funeral service presented Prince's daughter Beverley Prince with the folded flag which had been draped over Prince's coffin. Official representatives included the Lieutenant-Governor of Manitoba, Francis Laurence Jobin, on behalf of The Crown, senior officers of the Canadian Army, and the Consuls of France, of Italy and of the United States representing the respect for Prince of those nations. Prince's daughters Beryl and Beverley Prince were astonished at the impressive public response at the funeral of a man who had subsisted on menial jobs during his later years and they wondered where public officials had been during Prince's years of struggle with war wounds and unemployment. Prince had never discussed his war record with his daughters, and they were unaware of his status as a public hero before the funeral.

== Legacy ==
=== Honours and decorations ===
==== Second World War awards and recognition ====
After returning to the United Kingdom during WWII, Prince was summoned to Buckingham Palace on 12 February 1945, where George VI presented him with the Military Medal. When the King came to Prince, he reportedly atypically paused to speak with him for several minutes about his wartime actions with the Force. The King also asked Prince about conditions on the Brokenhead Reserve.

Prince later received the American Silver Star from Brigadier General E. F. Koenig on behalf of the President of the United States on 24 April 1945. He was one of only three Canadians to receive both the Military Medal and the Silver Star during the Second World War.

As a member of the Force, he received the Battle Honour "Mount Majo" for that extraordinary action, although for security reasons he received no individual award for his single-handed secret mission which neutralized the German defences in the battle.

In addition, Prince was Mentioned in Despatches on several occasions and received numerous campaign medals, including:

- 1939–1945 Star
- Italy Star
- France and Germany Star
- Defence Medal
- Canadian Volunteer Service Medal with Overseas Clasp
- War Medal 1939–1945

The Force as a unit also received several collective honours, including the Presidential Unit Citation and the French Croix de Guerre. In 2006, the Canadian members of the Force were each awarded the U.S. Army Combat Infantryman Badge in honour of their service in combat roles in WWII.

On 3 February 2015, the U.S. Congress Congressional Gold Medal was awarded to the Force as a unit.

Prince was reportedly recommended for the French Croix de Guerre for his actions rescuing a French partisan unit in France in September 1944, but the courier carrying the recommendation was killed before the message reached Charles de Gaulle.

In 2002 the Government of France presented the Prince family with an official certificate recognizing his contribution to the liberation of France during the war.

==== Korean War awards and recognition ====
Prince served with the 2 PPCLI during the Korean War. The battalion was awarded the United States Presidential Unit Citation for its role in the Battle of Kapyong.

Prince's company commanding officers in Korea declined to nominate him as a matter of principle for any individual award or medal for devising and leading the successful silent night assaults against Chinese forces during Operations Rugged and Dauntless in March/April 1951, or for leading his men in the recovery of the exposed UN forward position in the Second Battle of The Hook in November 1952. These were actions for which he would normally be expected to receive medals and recognition.

Prince also received the Korea Medal and the United Nations Korea Medal. After the creation of the decoration in 1991, he was additionally entitled posthumously to the Canadian Volunteer Service Medal for Korea.

In addition to the Presidential Unit Citation for the Battle of Kapyong, Prince and his fellow 2 PPCLI members were mentioned in the December 2016 designation of Stone as an official Korean War Hero by the Government of South Korea Ministry of Patriots and Veterans Affairs. The citation of this award stated that the 2 PPCLI "achieved a milestone victory when they won the Battle of Gapyeong (Kapyong) against formidable attacks from Chinese troops" and that "with their victory in the Battle of Gapyeong (Kapyong), Stone and his soldiers are remembered as the Legends of Gapyeong to this day."

=== Legacy and commemoration ===
==== Public monuments and named places ====
In 1976, one year before his death, Prince received a Certificate of Merit from the Manitoba Indian Brotherhood (now the Assembly of Manitoba Chiefs) for his years of service to Indigenous peoples in Manitoba.

Since his death, numerous places and institutions across Canada have been named in his honour.

These include:

- Sergeant Tommy Prince Street in Winnipeg
- Sergeant Tommy Prince School in Scanterbury, Manitoba
- Tommy Prince Barracks at CFB Petawawa
- Tommy Prince Drill Hall at the 3rd Canadian Division Training Centre in Wainwright, Alberta
- Sergeant Tommy Prince Army Training Initiative for Indigenous recruitment in the Canadian Armed Forces
- Tommy Prince Award scholarship administered by the Assembly of First Nations
- Tommy Prince Scholarship at Sault College in Sault Ste. Marie, Ontario
- 553 Sergeant Tommy Prince Royal Canadian Army Cadet Corps in Winnipeg
- Tommy Prince Road in the Valour Park / Victoria Cross Park development at Currie Barracks in Calgary (2010)
- Tom Prince Drive in Petersfield, Manitoba
- Sergeant Tommy Prince Place recreational facility in the Point Douglas neighbourhood of Winnipeg
- Tommy Prince Library at Crocus Plains Regional Secondary School in Brandon, Manitoba

On 11 November 1987 the Princess Patricia's Canadian Light Infantry erected a monument to Prince in Kildonan Park in Winnipeg beside the monument to his great-grandfather Peguis.

==== Media and cultural depictions ====
- The 1968 film The Devil's Brigade, about the First Special Service Force, depicted the unit's wartime operations, although Prince himself was not represented in the storyline. There was one soldier in the film named "Chief", perhaps a weak reference to Prince and his family background.
- In 1998 the television documentary Fallen Hero: The Tommy Prince Story aired and was nominated for three Leo Awards. The film was made available on loan from the Canadian War Museum and from various university libraries.
- In 2005 Historica Canada released a Heritage Minute about Prince.
- In 2010 it was announced that Canadian actor Adam Beach would portray Prince in a planned feature film about his life by Bay Film Studios. The film would be titled Tommy Prince: Prince of the Devils. The Canadian Army agreed to participate in the film. However, the project was later delayed by reshooting of scenes and the film company reported in bankruptcy.

==== Preservation and recovery of war medals ====
Prince had sold his war medals to sustain himself. After Prince's death, his military medals changed hands several times before coming up for auction in 2000 in London, Ontario. His nephew, Jim Bear, organized a pledge drive and purchased the medals on 10 August 2000, for $75,000 on the third bid, an extraordinary bid level for military medals at the time. The bid was backed by pledges from Aboriginal groups, by the Royal Canadian Legion, and by the Canadian government Veterans Affairs Canada Minister Ron Duhamel, the latter two organizations now offering some form of support to the Prince family. The Prince war medals were verified as originals by the Canadian War Museum in Ottawa. Bear then entrusted them for permanent display purposes to the Manitoba Museum in Winnipeg, the medals remaining the property of the Prince family.

==== Later national recognition ====
- In 2004 the Legislative Assembly of Manitoba unanimously passed a resolution recognizing Prince for his service and contributions to the province and to Canada.
- In 2016, a plaque honouring Prince was installed in the main floor of the Legislative Building of the Province of Manitoba in Winnipeg, Manitoba.
- In 2019 Prince was designated a Person of National Historic Significance by the Historic Sites and Monuments Board of Canada.
- On 17 October 2022 it was announced that Prince would be the subject of a postage stamp to be issued 28 October 2022, by Canada Post. The stamp shows Prince in his 2 PPCLI uniform from his Korean War period with a background of the Northern Lights (aurora borealis), his name with the designation MM (Military Medal), his decorations and mention of the Silver Star. The official presentation ceremony of the Tommy Prince postage stamp was attended and featured speeches by Prince's son Tommy Prince Jr. and by singer William Prince, a cousin of the family, who sang a song by Buffy Sainte Marie at the event.
- On 25 October 2025, Prince's 110th birthday was celebrated in Petersfield, Manitoba. The celebration received an official letter from the Prime Minister of Canada Mark Carney, who stated that “Sergeant Tommy Prince demonstrated incredible bravery, patriotism, and combat skills serving Canada in World War II and the Korean War. He was the most decorated soldier in the First Special Service Force. [Prince] is rightfully recognized as one of the persons of national historic significance in Canada. He was a great hero in so many ways, in his moral spirit, in combat, in his advocacy and in the significant impact he made in the lives of others”.
