= Red River Valley =

Region in central North America drained by the Red River of the North

Coordinates: 49°00′N 97°30′W

The Red River Valley is a region in central North America that is drained by the Red River of the North; it is part of both Canada and the United States. Forming the border between Minnesota and North Dakota when these territories were admitted as states in the United States, this fertile valley has been important to the economies of these states and to Manitoba, Canada.

The population centers of Moorhead, Minnesota; Fargo and Grand Forks, North Dakota; and Winnipeg, Manitoba, developed in the valley as settlement by ethnic Europeans increased in the late nineteenth century. Completion of major railroads, availability of cheap lands, and forceful removal of Indigenous people as well as a subsequent refusal to recognize Indigenous land claims attracted many new settlers. Some developed large-scale agricultural operations known as bonanza farms, which concentrated on wheat commodity crops.

Paleogeographic Lake Agassiz laid down the Red River Valley Silts. The river flows north through a wide ancient lake plain to Lake Winnipeg. The geography and seasonal conditions can produce devastating floods, with several recorded since the mid-20th century.

== Indigenous population ==
The valley was long an area of habitation by various indigenous nations, including the Ojibwe.

== Early European settlement ==
French fur traders had relations with First Nations and Native Americans throughout the Great Lakes region. They often lived with the tribes and married or had relations with native women. By the mid-17th century, the Métis, descendants of these Frenchmen and Cree tribes people (in addition to other First Nations peoples), settled in the Red River valley. Métis peoples largely originated in the Red River Valley and organized politically in the 19th century, radiating outward from the Red River Settlement (now Winnipeg). Descendants of this community are known as the Red River Métis. The Métis established an ethnicity and culture, as many continued a tradition as hunters and traders involved in the fur trade. They were also farmers in this area.

The British took over French territory east of the Mississippi River following its victory in the Seven Years' War. In the early 19th century, the lucrative fur trade attracted continuing interest, and Lord Selkirk established the Red River Colony. In 1803 the United States acquired former French territory west of the Mississippi River in the Louisiana Purchase from France. This included some of the Red River Valley.

== U.S. geographical importance ==
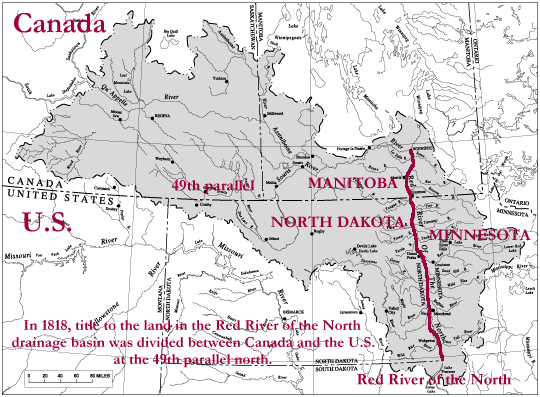
Red River drainage basin

The U.S. government uses the term Red River Valley generally to describe the sections of northwestern Minnesota and eastern North Dakota to which it secured title following the Anglo-American Convention of 1818 that settled the northern boundary of the US and Canada.

This land became part as the second article of the 1818 treaty declared the 49th parallel to be the official border between the U.S. and Canada up to the Rocky Mountains. (This borderline was extended to the Pacific Ocean in 1846 under the Oregon Treaty.) The land acquired under the treaty had an area of 29,066,880 acres (117,629.5 km^{2}), comprising 1.3 percent of total U.S. land area. Centered on the Red River of the North, these lands had previously been under the control of Great Britain.

West of the Red River Valley, the territory of the Louisiana Purchase, which the US acquired from France, extends north of the 49th parallel. The US ceded this to Britain in exchange for gaining the Red River Valley. These northernmost parts of the Louisiana Purchase are one of the few North American territories ever ceded by the United States to a foreign power.

== Prone to flooding ==
Four factors make the Red River Valley prone to flooding (the factors are related to physical geography):

Synchrony of Discharge with Spring Thaw: The Red River flows northward. The spring thaw also proceeds gradually northward. As a result, runoff from the southern portion of the valley gradually joins the fresh melt-off waters from northerly areas along the Red River. In the northern part of the Valley, this can result in devastating floods if the effects occur at the same time.

Ice Jams: These are also produced because of the northward-flowing river system. Ice is moving from the southern Valley and freshly-broken ice is moving from the central and northern Valley. These two meet steadily; as a result, ice concentration in this system builds and causes delay of water flow.

Glacial Lake Plain: The floor of Glacial Lake Agassiz is one of the flattest expanses of land in the world. Here, the Red River has cut a shallow, winding valley. As a result of this, when the river floods on this plain, a devastating event can occur. The areal coverage of the waters can become dramatic. Being approximately 9,300 years old, the Red River has not yet carved a large valley-floodplain systems on the surrounding geography. Thus, the large lake plain becomes the floodplain to the Red River. The Lake Agassiz glacial lake plain extends around 100 miles from east to west, end to end, between northeastern North Dakota and northwestern Minnesota.

Decrease in Gradient Downstream: The gradient, or slope, of the Red River averages 5 inches per mile of length. In the region of Drayton-Pembina, the gradient is only 1.5 inches per mile. The water tends to pool in this area during flood season. The region can become a massive, shallow lake.

== See also ==
- Treaty of Old Crossing
- Pembina Region
- Portage Diversion
- Red River Floodway
