= Pembina Region =

Coordinates: 48°20′N 97°50′W

- Unorganized territory of United States
- 1818–1889
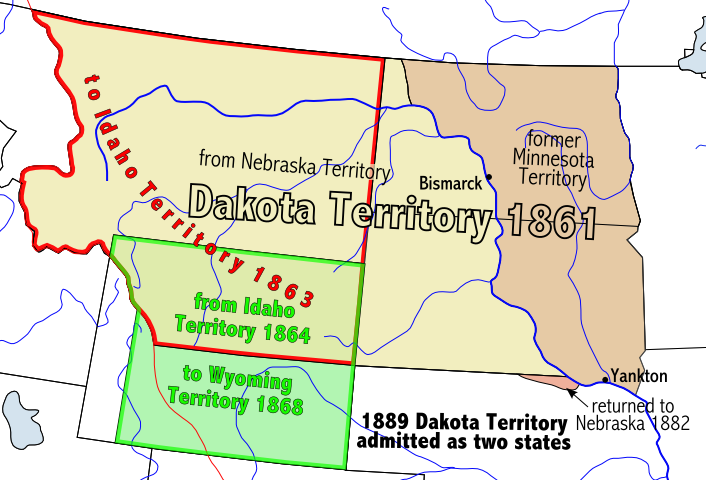
- Capital: Washington DC (1818–1849); Bismarck (1883–1889)
  - Type: Unorganized unincorporated Territory or Region
- History
  - Former British Territory: October 19, 1818
  - Created from Treaty of 1818: 1818
  - US/British boundary change to US: 1818
  - To Territory of Missouri: October 20, 1818
  - unorganized Territory (after Missouri became a state): August 10, 1821
  - Dakota Territotry: March 2, 1861
  - North Dakota and South Dakota statehood: 2 November 1889
Preceded by
Nebraska Territory
Unorganized territory
Succeeded by
Idaho Territory
Wyoming Territory
North Dakota
South Dakota

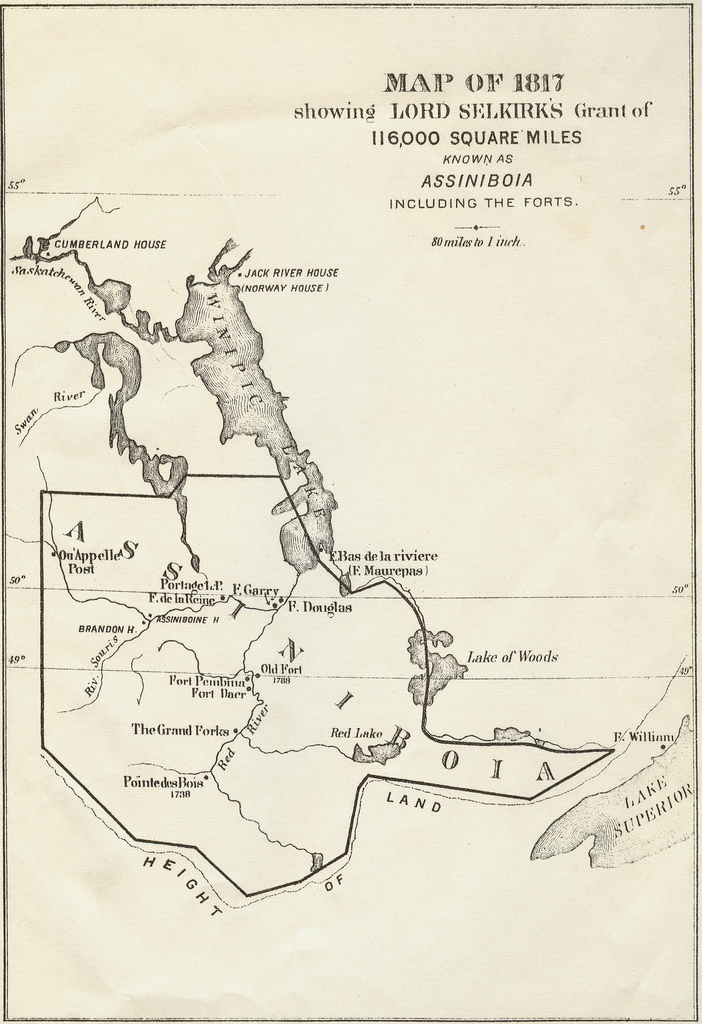
Assiniboia

The Pembina Region (/ˈpɛmbɪnə/ PEM-bi-nə), also referred to as the Pembina District and Pembina Department, is the historic name of an unorganized territory of land that was ceded to the United States in 1818. The area included the portions of what became the States of Minnesota, North Dakota, and South Dakota lying within the Hudson Bay drainage basin. The area included settlements in the Pembina River area. The region was formerly part of British Rupert's Land, granted by British royal charter to the Hudson's Bay Company. After the Selkirk Concession and establishment of the agricultural Red River Colony in 1812, the area was governed as the District of Assiniboia. The Treaty of 1818 de jure transferred the region south of the 49th parallel to the United States from the British. Settlements south of the boundary continued to be de facto administered as part of Assiniboia until at least 1823.

The area was referred to as the Pembina District after the U.S. Army Major Stephen Harriman Long made surveys during the 1823 expedition to the Red River of the North and placed an International boundary marker north of Pembina clearly defining the border between the United States and British North America. Prior to 1823, the Pembina settlement was believed by both countries to be within the boundary of British North America.

Several attempts at formal recognition and naming failed to pass Congress. In 1849 Father Georges-Antoine Belcourt described the area, referred to as Pembina district or department, as a country about 400 miles from north to south and more than five hundred miles from east to west. The region was considered unorganized territory from 1818 until June 28, 1834, when Congress assigned it to the Michigan Territory. Subsequently, the region was successively a part of Iowa Territory, Wisconsin Territory, and finally Minnesota Territory. When Minnesota became a state on May 11, 1858, and its western boundary was set at the Red River, the western part of the Pembina region again became unorganized territory. Organization of Dakota Territory on March 2, 1861 marked the final establishment of organized territorial government.

The portion of the historic Pembina region not incorporated into the State of Minnesota was apportioned to the States of North and South Dakota on their admission to the Union of November 2, 1889.

== History ==
Several events shaped the area of the Pembina Region within the United States. The Louisiana Purchase (1803) included almost all of current South Dakota, the southern half and some of the north-central part of Minnesota, that became the District of Louisiana. The area was populated mostly with Chippewa (Ojibwe), fur trappers, and Métis, that was a mixture of French and Indian.

After trying unsuccessfully to get a British land grant, because the land was under a monopoly of the Hudson's Bay Company (HBC), Thomas Douglas, 5th Earl of Selkirk acquired controlling interest in the HBC and received 116,000 square miles of land in the Selkirk Concession of 1811. The area of land within the grant became known as the Assiniboia Territory, and extended south to the watershed of the Red River near the 45th parallel north. The current community of Pembina was within the area.

=== Treaties ===
The Treaty of Paris (1783) did not clearly set northern United States/Canadian boundaries. According to the treaty the boundary line was to leave the Northwesternmost point of the Lake of the Woods (the current boundary) "on a due West Course to the river Mississippi" which is much farther south.

Jay Treaty (1796) boundaries issues were still unresolved in 1801. The Treaty of Ghent (1814-1815). The Rush–Bagot Treaty (April 16, 1818) was a treaty of disarmament and peaceful negotiations creating a demilitarized boundary. The following Treaty of Washington (1871) set up peaceful international arbitration. Indian treaties further open land to expansion and this was the beginning of the seeking of territorial status.

The Treaty of 1818 (October 20, 1818) was a land swap, exchanging British possessions south of the new 49th parallel boundary for US possessions that extended north of the border. After a border survey in 1823, the Hudson's Bay Company could not continue to assume that Pembina stood on British soil and moved into southern Canada.

=== Territorial status ===
In 1834, the Pembina District became part of the Michigan Territory, and was subsequently assigned to Wisconsin and Iowa Territories. For a brief period after the admission of the States of Iowa (December 28, 1846) and Wisconsin (May 29, 1848), some or all of the region reverted to unorganized status. Establishment of Minnesota Territory on March 3, 1849 was followed by organization of Pembina County, encompassing the historic Pembina settlement.

Pembina was represented by Joe Rolette in the Minnesota Territorial legislature. Rolette is renowned for subverting passage of a bill proposing to divide Minnesota Territory along an east-west line, which would have moved the State capital to St. Peter, and left Pembina once again in unorganized territory.

When Minnesota became a state in 1858 the area became unorganized again. A provisional government was set up that lobbied for territory status. The main reason to organize the area was to induce settlement with a more localized government. After the Dakota Territory was organized there was still a move for more local territorial control because of the distance to the territorial capital. Factions were attempting this in different areas of the territory. South Dakota introduced legislation, with the support of the Committee on Territories, for the creation of the West and East River Territories.

In 1868, after the discovery of gold in the Black Hills (1876), there was a proposal to separate the western half into the "Territory of Lincoln" and the eastern half as the Dakota Territory. In February 1872 the Senate Committee on Territories reviewed a bill to create the Pembina Territory with the capital at Bismarck, and Dakota (present-day South Dakota) with Yankton as the capital. A final solution was found on November 2, 1889, when both North and South Dakota became separate states.

== Gallery ==
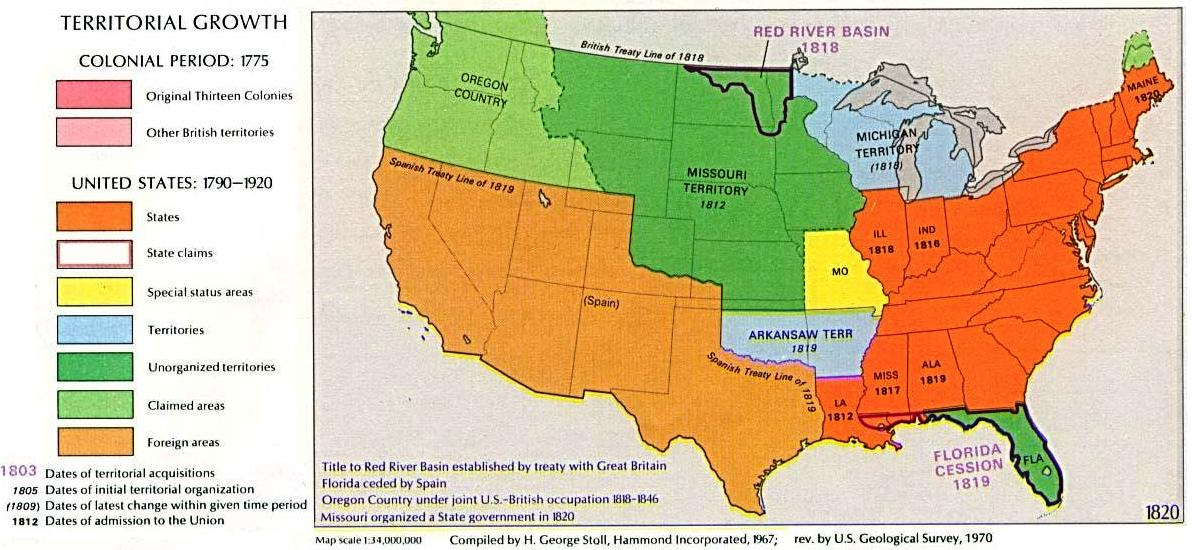
Territorial growth

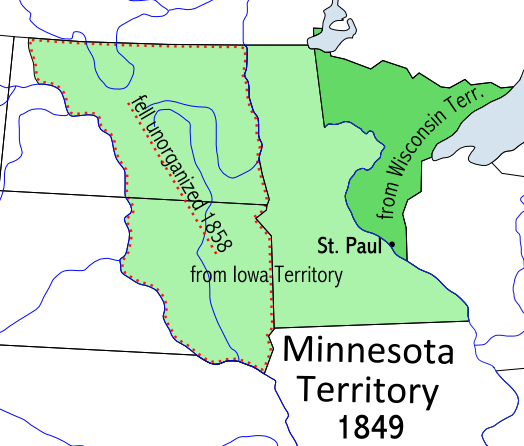

== See also ==
- Treaty of Old Crossing
- Red River ox carts
