= Peguis =

Saulteaux chief (c. 1774 – 1864)

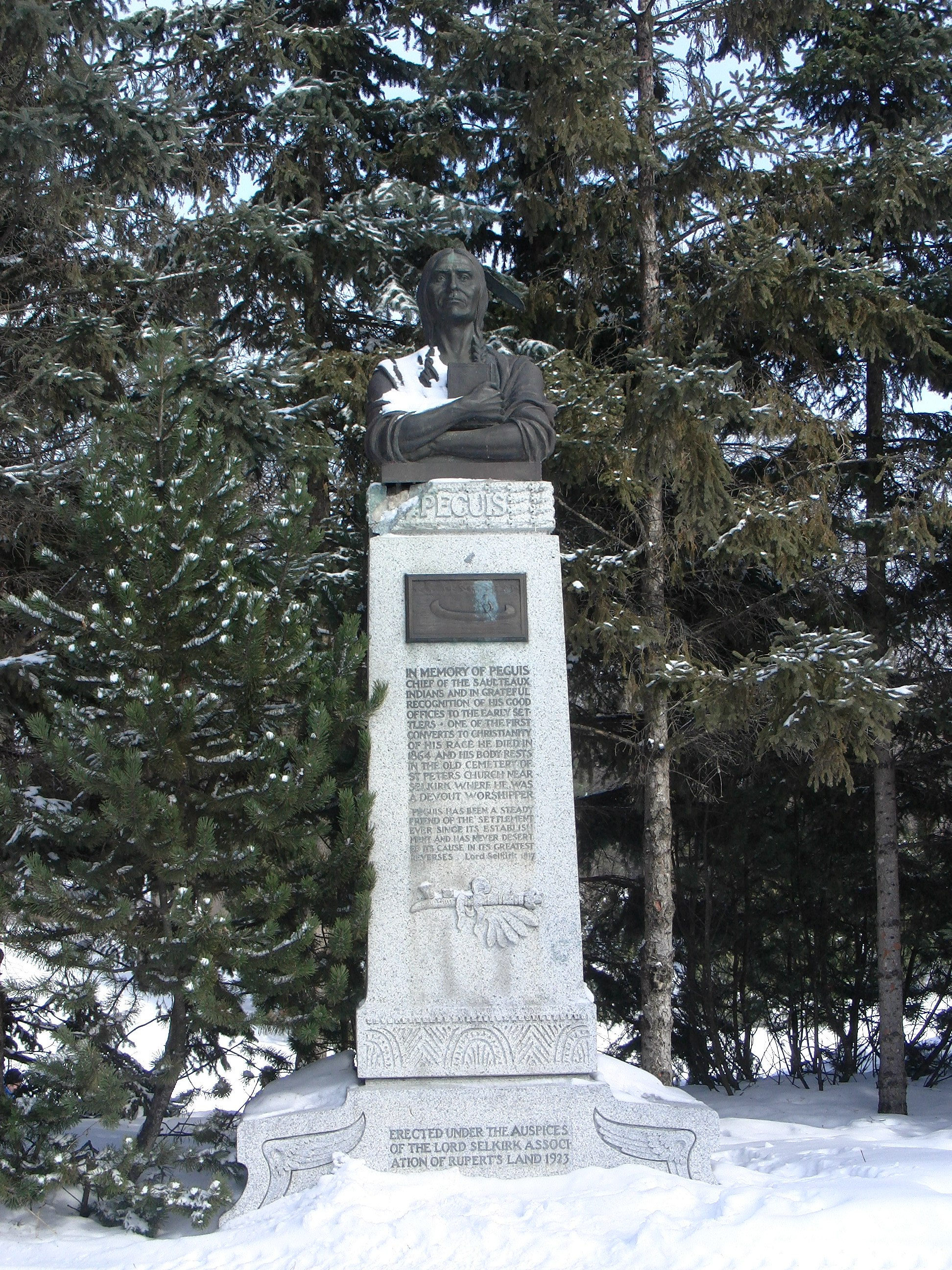
- Peguis monument at Kildonan Park, Winnipeg. A conventional representation, since no portrait was made in life.
- Born: c. 1774
- Died: September 28, 1864
- Other names: William King; Cut Nose
- Title: Chief
- Relatives: Tommy Prince (great-grandson)

Peguis (ca. 1774 – 28 September 1864) was a Saulteaux chief, who moved from the Great Lakes area (near Sault Ste. Marie, Ontario) to Red Lake (now in Minnesota), then arriving in what is now southern Manitoba in the 1790s.

In 1817, he signed the first treaty (Selkirk Treaty) with Lord Selkirk, granting land along the Red River to the Selkirk settlers. In 1840, he was one of the early western First Nations converts to Christianity and was given the baptized name William King; his children adopted the surname "Prince". He and his people had helped both the Hudson's Bay Company and the Selkirk settlers; indeed, without Peguis' help, the Selkirk settlers might well have starved. However, by the 1850s, he had become concerned at illegal settlement by European migrants on traditional lands. He was sometimes called Cut Nose since his nose had been injured in a fight in 1802.

His name is commemorated in the name of Peguis First Nation, Chief Peguis Trail (Winnipeg Route 17), and many organizations, place names, and institutions of Manitoba.

== See also ==
- Henry Prince, his son, signatory of Treaty No. 1
- Tommy Prince, his great-grandson, Canadian hero of World War II and the Korean War
- William Prince, his descendant, 21st-century Canadian singer-songwriter
