= Kona Williams =

Kona Williams (born 1977 or 1978) is a forensic pathologist, the first First Nations person in that profession in Canada.

The daughter of Gordon Williams, a Cree from Peguis First Nation in Manitoba, and Karen Jacobs-Williams, a Mohawk from Kahnawake, she was born in Ottawa. She studied medicine at the University of Ottawa, received her M.D. in 2009, and spent five more years as an anatomical pathology resident there. She continued with a post-graduate fellowship in the department of laboratory medicine and pathobiology at the University of Toronto. In 2016, she was hired by the Ontario Forensic Pathology Service, which provides pathology services for the Ontario police forces.
