= Henry Prince (chief) =

Saulteaux Indian chief

Henry Prince (c. 1819 – June 7, 1899), born Pa-bat-or-kok-or-sis or Mis-koo-kenew ('Red Eagle'), was a Saulteaux Indian chief of the Peguis First Nation.

== Early life ==
Pa-bat-or-kok-or-sis was born in a settlement along the banks of the Netley Creek about 11 miles (18 km) down river from future site of the St. Peter's Church and settlement (approx. 1837), to Chief Peguis and Victoria, one of his wives. He attended school at a one-room schoolhouse operated out of the St. Peter's Church, and was baptized Henry Prince in 1837. In 1840, he married Sarah Badger, with whom he had at least 6 children. In 1864, after the death of his father, he became Chief of the St. Peter's Indian Band (later called the Peguis First Nation).

== As Chief ==
On November 6, 1869, shortly after Louis Riel took control of Upper Fort Garry as part of the Red River Rebellion, he issued an invitation to the parishes of the English speaking settlers north of the Forks to a meeting, in an attempt to gain their support. Chief Henry Prince represented the parish of St. Peter's in these meetings, wherein he indicated his disapproval of the Métis actions, and refused to join Riel. On rumours of Métis action against Lower Fort Garry, he offered support against the rebellion to the Canadian Government surveyors billeted there.

In 1870, after the rebellion was ended, a large delegation led by Chief Henry Prince met with Adams George Archibald Lieutenant-Governor newly formed Province of Manitoba, indicating a desire for a Treaty, and compensation for lands surrendered to Lord Selkirk. Negotiations between Wemyss Mackenzie Simpson and several Indian bands at Lower Fort Gary began in July, 1871, and Treaty 1 was signed on August 3.

In 1877, the local Indian Agent was required to deal with a petition by several members of the band against Chief Henry Price, asking for his removal. Their charges included that the chief had been jailed for drunkenness, and that he had used treaty funds belonging to the band for his own purposes. On investigation, the agent concluded that the charges were almost certainly true, but that it would be inconvenient to have the chief removed. The charges were dismissed, and a reprimand was issued.

In November 1877, Chief Henry Prince complained to Interior Minister David Mills about the treatment of Indians, and the lack of support by Acting Indian Commissioner Joseph Provencher. In December, 1877, After an investigation into allegations of fraud in the office of the Indian Affairs involving sale of Indian lands, Provencher was removed from office. However, Henry Prince was also implicated in the lot sales.

Henry Prince continued to serve as Chief of the Peguis First Nation until 1882, when William Prince (likely his older brother) was elected. After this, Henry Prince served two further terms as chief, 1888-1890 and 1897–1899. He died on June 7, 1899, and was buried the next day in an unmarked grave in St. Peter's cemetery.
