= Selkirk Concession =

1812 land grant issued by the Hudson's Bay Company

The Selkirk Concession was a land grant issued by the Hudson's Bay Company (HBC) to Thomas Douglas, 5th Earl of Selkirk, in 1812. The Hudson's Bay Company held a commercial monopoly in Rupert's Land, consisting of the entire Hudson Bay drainage basin.

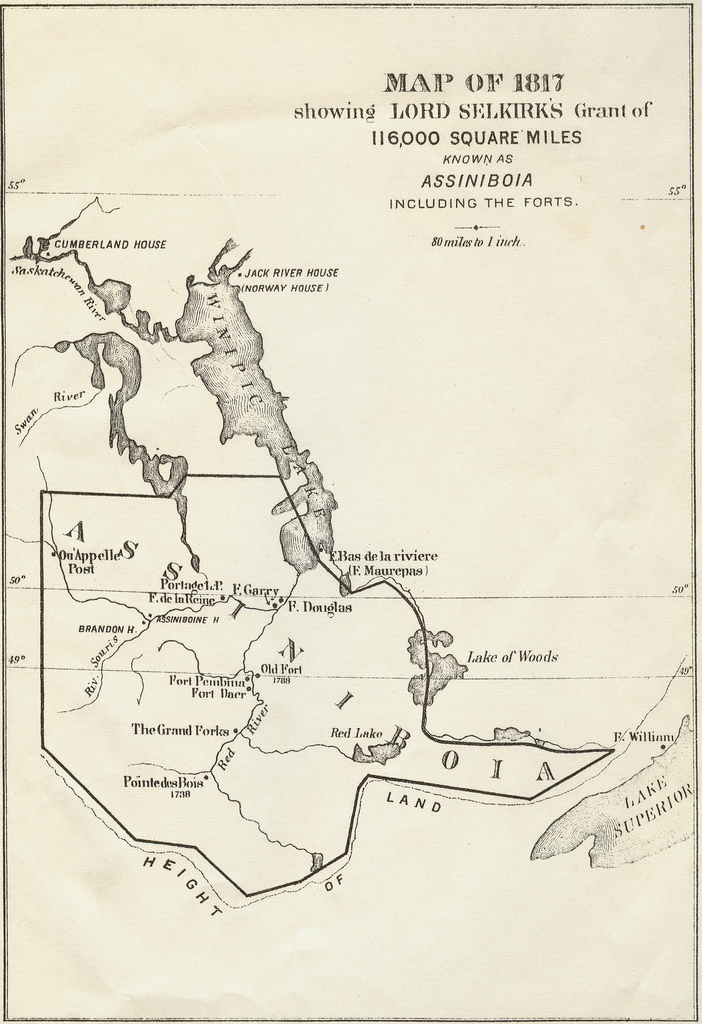
Selkirk Concession (which Selkirk called District of Assiniboia), within which Selkirk established the Red River Colony

The Selkirk Concession, also known as Selkirk's Grant, included a large section of the southwest area of Rupert's Land, bounded: on the north by the line of 52° N latitude roughly from the Assiniboine River east to Lake Winnipegosis, then by the line of 52° 30′ N latitude from Lake Winnipegosis to Lake Winnipeg; on the east by the Winnipeg River, Lake of the Woods and Rainy River; on the west roughly by the current boundary between modern Saskatchewan and Manitoba; and on the south by the (mostly very slight) rise of land marking the extent of the Hudson Bay watershed. This covered portions of present-day southern Manitoba, northern Minnesota and eastern North Dakota, in addition to small parts of eastern Saskatchewan, northwestern Ontario and northeastern South Dakota The present day USA lands were ceded by Britain in the Treaty of 1818.

Lord Selkirk referred to the area as the District of Assiniboia and planned to create an agricultural colony there. To do so he populated the territory with impoverished people from Scotland and Ireland. Lord Selkirk had been profoundly upset by the poverty his people faced and believed that emigration to Western Canada would be their salvation. In return he was to provide The Hudson's Bay Company with 200 employees per year, allow the company to set up trading posts in the colony and give land for company employees when they retired. In 1812 the first settlers arrived when Miles MacDonell brought a small group of Scots to the colony.

While The Hudson's Bay Company held the commercial monopoly in Rupert's Land, numerous aboriginal groups lived in the same territory and disputed the sovereignty of the area. Furthermore, The Hudson's Bay Company was facing competition from the North West Company (NWC), which flagrantly violated the Hudson's Bay Company's commercial monopoly and disputed its territory. In 1814, The Hudson's Bay Company invoked its royal charter and ordered The North West Company to leave. Selkirk's settlement, commonly known as The Red River Colony, was embroiled in these issues, meeting resistance from fur traders of The North West Company, commercial interests from the United States as well as from some local Métis population. In November 1815 the newly appointed governor of Red River Colony, Robert Semple, arrived with around 160 new settlers. Tensions continued to rise, culminating in the Battle of Seven Oaks in June 1816. This confrontation involved a group of North West Company employees led by Cuthbert Grant and some local Métis against a group of Red River settlers and Hudson's Bay Company employees led by Governor Semple, with the battle claiming the lives of 1 North West Company-related and 21 Hudson's Bay Company-related men, including Semple. (see Pemmican War)

== Selkirk Treaty 1817 and Treaty No. 1 1871 ==
Lord Selkirk signed a treaty with Chief Peguis that eventually became St. Peter’s Reserve in 1817, but Chief Peguis’s people would eventually lose the land and be forced to move to the current Peguis First Nation by 1930s when Selkirk’s colony became the province of Manitoba in 1870, the area then became St. Peter’s Settlement and eventually merge into Selkirk, Manitoba.

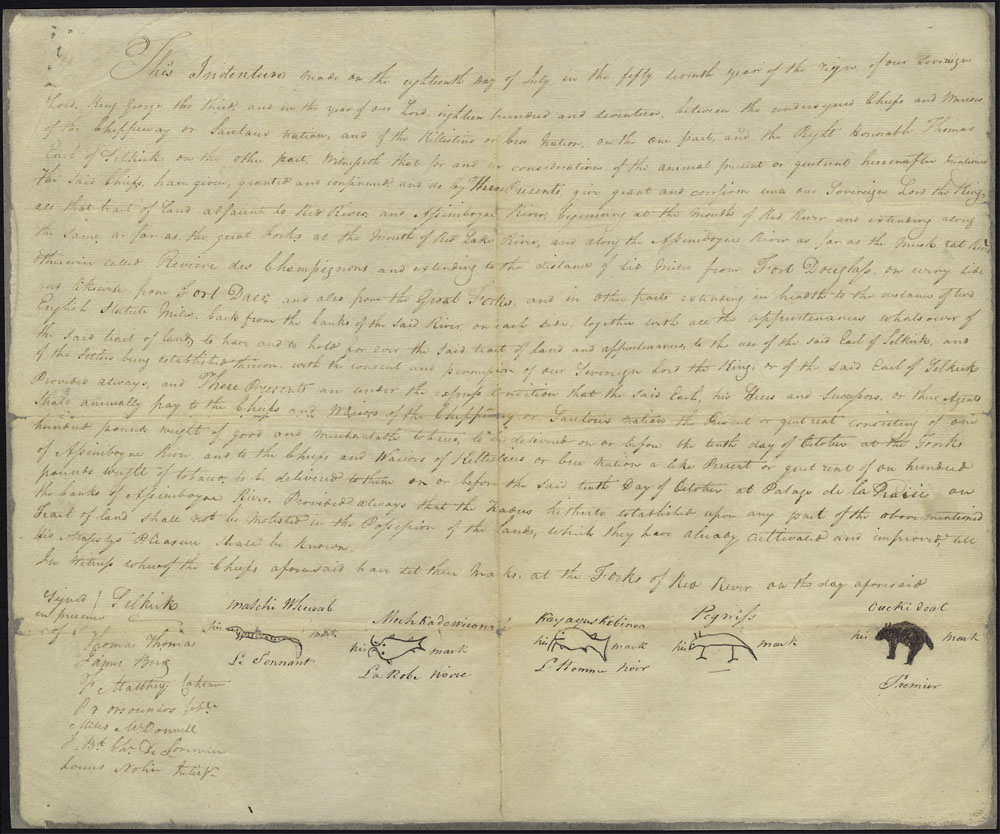
1817, Selkirk Treaty

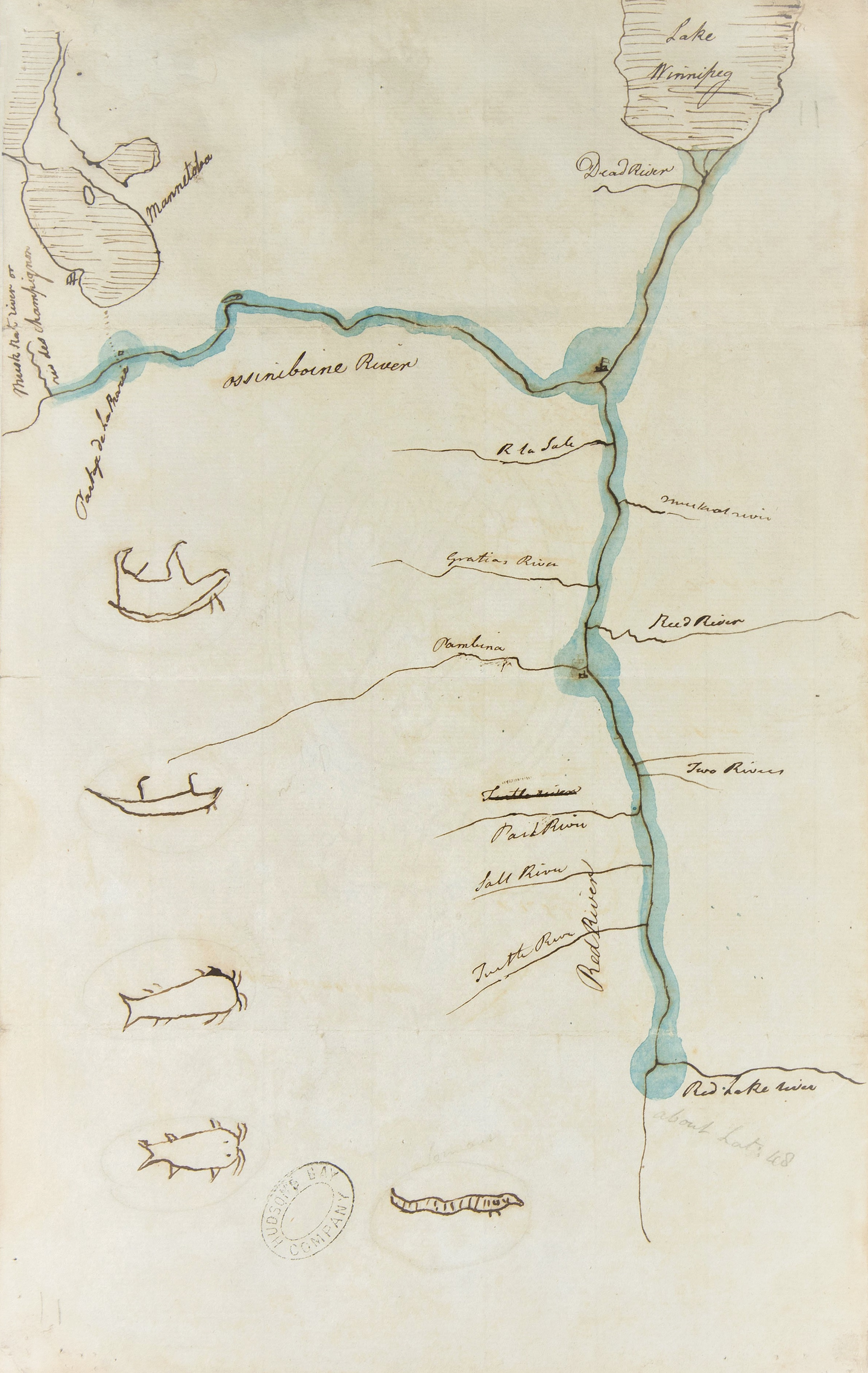
Map

By the 1830s agricultural production of flour was over 50,000 pounds, with over 1,000 settlers residing at the colony. The promise of free land ensured there was no shortage of settlers arriving at the area. By the 1850s the Hudson's Bay Company lost interest in providing financial aid to the colony. In 1867, the United Kingdom had passed the British North America Act, creating the Dominion of Canada from British holdings in the eastern portion of British North America. In 1869 the HBC "sold" Rupert's Land (received compensation for surrendering its trading monopoly back to the British Crown) to the expanding Canada. A lack of attention to concerns of the existing Red River settlers, Métis, and aboriginal groups caused Métis leader Louis Riel to establish a local provisional government to negotiate the political treatment of the local population in the handover to Canada, resulting in the Red River Rebellion of 1869-70 and Canada agreeing to create the province of Manitoba – on land that had been part of the Selkirk Concession – in 1870.
