= Peguis First Nation =

First Nation in Manitoba, Canada

- Band No. 269
- Oshki-ishkonigan
- Flag of Peguis First Nation, created by elder Freda Bear in 1983
- People: Saulteaux (Ojibway) and Swampy Cree (Maškēkowak)
- Treaty: Treaty 1

Land
- Main reserve: Peguis 1B
- Reserves: Peguis 1C, 1D, 1E, 1F, 1G, 1H, 1I, and St. Peters Fishing Station 1A

Population (2024)
- On reserve: 3746
- On other land: 133
- Off reserve: 8166
- Total population: 12045

Government
- Chief: Stan Bird

Tribal Council
- Interlake Reserves Tribal Council

Website
- peguisfirstnation.ca

Peguis First Nation (formerly St. Peter's Band; Ojibwe: Oshki-ishkonigan meaning 'new reserve') is the largest First Nations community in Manitoba, Canada, with a population of approximately 11,438 people (3,607 on reserve and 7,831 off reserve). The members of Peguis are of Saulteaux (Ojibway) and Maškēkowak (Swampy Cree) descent.

The main reserve, Peguis 1B, is located approximately 196 kilometres north of Winnipeg. The reserve is currently located about 170 km northwest of the original reserve (called St. Peter's). It was moved to its present location in 1907 after an illegal land transfer.

The First Nation is named after Peguis, the chief who led a band of Saulteaux people from present-day Sault Ste. Marie, Ontario, area to a Cree settlement at Netley Creek, Manitoba, and to present-day East Selkirk, Manitoba.

== History ==
Chief Peguis and his Band settled in an area north of present-day Selkirk in the late 1700s. Their history is documented in journals of the Hudson's Bay Company, the Lord Selkirk settlers, and the Church Missionary Society. Peguis and other chiefs signed the Selkirk Treaty in 1817. The treaty allocated land along the Red and Assiniboine Rivers to Lord Selkirk and his settlers for an annual rent of tobacco.

On 3 August 1871, Peguis' son Mis-Koo-Kinew (or Henry Prince) signed Treaty 1 on behalf of the St. Peter's Band, the name of the Peguis First Nation at the time. Treaty 1 specified that Peguis would be given 160 acres (0.65 km^{2}) of land for each family of five people.

In 2008, Peguis First Nation announced the finalization of a land claims settlement with the federal Government of Canada. The claim is for land which was surrendered near Selkirk in 1907.

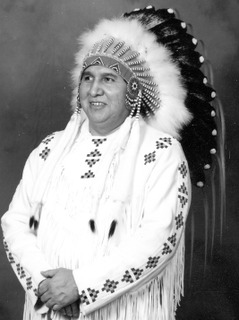
Louis J. Stevenson Chief of Peguis from 1981 to 2007

== Chiefs ==
=== Head chiefs ===
c.1810 - 1864 Peguis (Peehquaais "Little Chip") from 1838 known as William King; 1864 - 1871 Henry Prince (chief) (Miskokenew "Red Eagle")

=== Chiefs of St. Peter's Reserve (Treaty 1, 1871) known as Peguis Reserve after 1909 ===
1871 - 1882 Henry Prince (1st time - as reserve chief versus hereditary chief); 1882 - 1888 William Prince; 1888 - 1891 Henry Prince (2nd time); 1891 - 1897 William Asham; 1897 - 1899 Henry Prince (3rd time); 1899 - 1903 William Henry Prince (1st time); 1903 - 1905 John H. Prince; 1905 - 1911 William Henry Prince (2nd time); 1911 - 1917 Albert Rose; 1917 - 1923 William Pahkoo; 1923 - 1926 Thomas John Stevenson; 1926 - 1929 Fred Thomas; 1929 - 1932 Alex Greyeyes; 1932 - 1935 Robert Sinclair; 1935 - 1941 Nathaniel Asham (1st time); 1941 - 1944 Albert Edward Prince; 1944 - 1947 Alex Williams; 1947 - 1953 Nathaniel Asham (2nd time); 1953 - 1955 Alex Sinclair; 1955 - 1961 Campbell Sutherland; 1961 - 1973 Albert Edward Thompson; 1973 - 1981 Jack Sinclair; 1981 - 2007 Louis John Stevenson; 2007 - 2015 Glenn A. Hudson (1st time); 2015 - 2017 Cindy Spence; 2017 - 2023 Glenn A. Hudson (2nd time); 2023 - current Stan Bird

== Reserves ==
Peguis First Nation consists of ten reserves: 1075 Portage Ave - Winnipeg, Peguis 1B, Peguis 1C, Peguis 1D, Peguis 1E, Peguis 1F, Pegius 1G, Peguis 1H, Peguis 1I and St. Peters Fishing Station 1A. The reserves of Peguis total 30657.2 hectares (75755.6 acres) in area.

The largest settlement, which lies on the main reserve (1B), is also named Peguis, Manitoba, and is located at 51°18′15″N 97°33′50″W. The main reserve lies adjacent to the northern borders of the Rural Municipality of Fisher. 1A is at the closest Lake Winnipeg access point near Peguis, the others are located near Selkirk, East Selkirk, Libau and in Winnipeg.

== Media ==
The Peguis First Nation operates a First Nations community radio station, CJFN-FM 102.7.

== Floods ==
=== 2009 ===
On 24 March 2009, Peguis First Nation along with Roseau River First Nation, Sioux Falls, St. Andrews, St. Clements and Selkirk, Manitoba, experienced a hydrological flood. The total cost of flood in the region was CAD 40,000,000. 3,000 people were evacuated in the region. It was listed on the Canadian Disaster database.

=== 2010 ===
Heavy rain and high winds in the Interlake Region of Manitoba from 1 to 5 July 2010, caused flooding and evacuation of Peguis First Nation’s 250 residents. Approximately 300 homes on-reserve were damaged and several roads washed out. Most residents were temporarily relocated to Winnipeg and a few near Fisher River Cree Nation.

=== 2011 ===
By February 2011, Peguis First Nation were meeting with Aboriginal Affairs and Northern Development officials about controlling mould in the 75 homes damaged by flooding. In March 2011, as community piled sandbags in flood preparations, the Peguis First Nation's emergency measures co-ordinator, said Peguis First Nation experienced two major floods since 2009.

=== Preparation ===
In 2013, AANDC invested more than CAD$4 million to Peguis First Nation for long-term flood proofing as part of a 2010 commitment to protect 75 homes.

== Notable people ==
- Carter Bear, First Round NHL draft pick, 2025,
- Marcia Anderson DeCouteau, former president of the Indigenous Physicians Association of Canada
- Amy Clemons, a founding member of the first Indian & Metis Friendship Centre in Canada, recipient of the Order of Canada
- Trevor Greyeyes, writer, journalist, editor
- Linden McCorrister, hockey player, Brandon Wheat Kings
- Cheryl McKenzie, journalist for APTN
- Renae Morriseau, actress, storyteller, director
- Nile Expedition boatmen; Adam Cochrane, Alex Cochrane, Richard Henderson, John Pratt, Thomas Pratt, William Prince, George Settee
- Shirley Olson, a co-founder of the Original Women's Network, an Executive Director of the Assembly of Manitoba Chiefs, lawyer, community activist, an organizer of Peace Village (Winnipeg, Manitoba)
- Peguis, or Peehquaais (Little Chip) after 1838 known as William King, Head Chief of Red River Saulteaux c.1810-1864
- Tommy Prince, soldier
- William Prince, singer-songwriter
- Bill Shead, former mayor of Selkirk Manitoba (1980-1983), first CEO of Aboriginal Centre of Winnipeg
- Murray Sinclair, former senator in the Canadian Senate, Chair of the Truth and Reconciliation Commission of Canada, former Manitoba provincial court judge
- Niigaanwewidam James Sinclair, educator, writer, editor, activist
- Jordan Stranger, visual artist
- Rosa Walker, founder of the Indigenous Leadership Development Institute
- Joshua Whitehead, writer
- Kona Williams, first Indigenous Canadian forensic pathologist

== See also ==
- Muskoday First Nation
