= Treaty 1 =

Treaty between First Nations and Canadian Crown

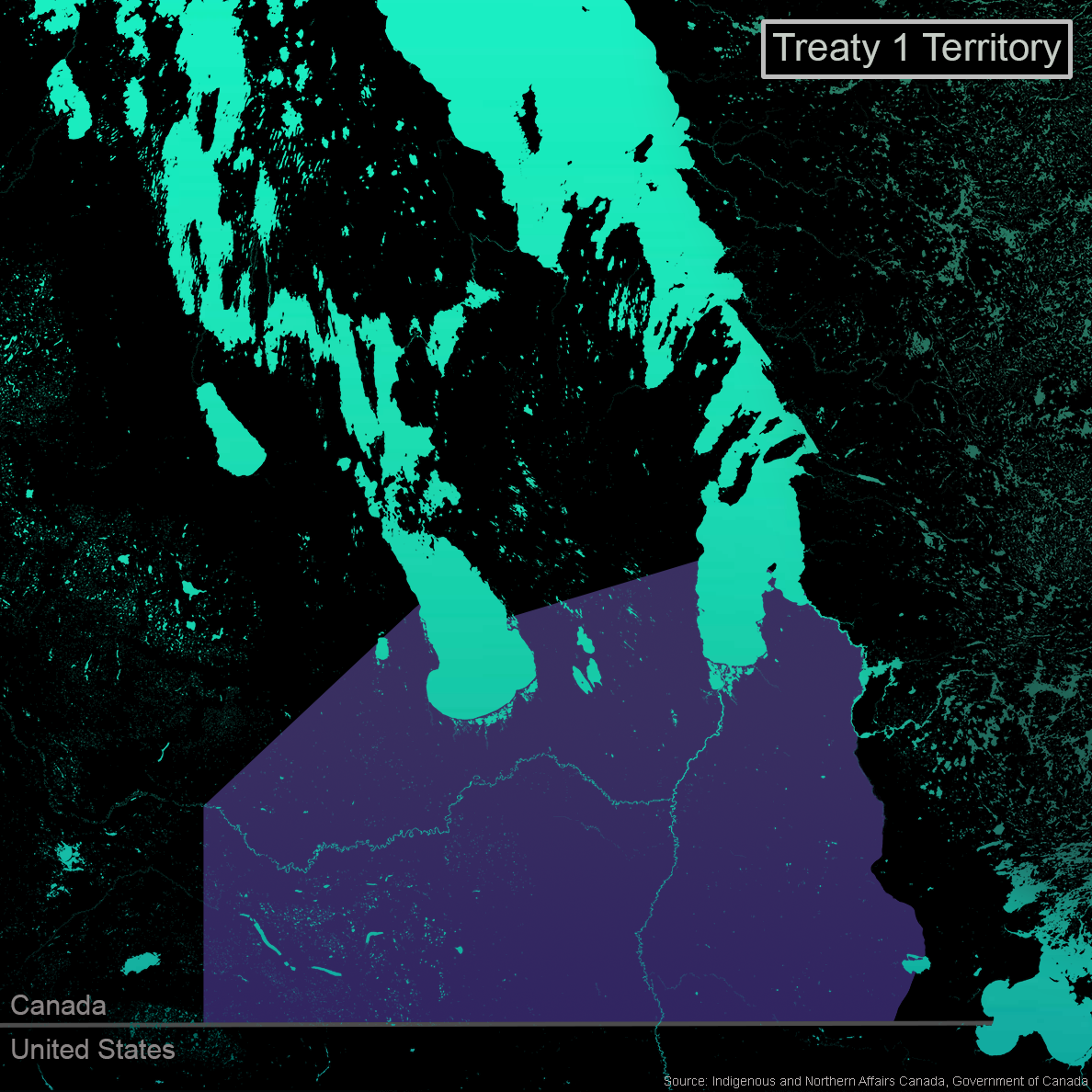
Treaty 1 Territory

Treaty 1 (also known as the "stone fort treaty") is an agreement established on August 3, 1871, between the Crown and the Anishinaabe and Swampy Cree, Canadian-based First Nations. The first of a series of treaties called the Numbered Treaties that occurred between 1871 and 1921, this accord has been held to be essentially about peace and friendship. However, the eight days of treaty-making ended with the Indigenous groups agreeing to "cede, release, surrender and yield up to Her Majesty the Queen and successors forever all the lands" in southern Manitoba to the Crown, in exchange for an annual annuity and material goods such as clothing and agricultural supplies. Indigenous treaty delegates and other leaders did not intend any cession, release, or surrender of the land in question.

Within a year of the agreement, however, the Indigenous communities approached the Canadian government declaring that a number of the items promised, which would become known as the "Outside Promises", within the treaty had not been handed over to them yet, although subjects of the Crown continued to settle the land based upon the agreed-upon Treaty. On April 30, 1875, a council of the federal government passed an order stating that it must be ensured that all of the Outside Promises were to be fulfilled and considered a part of the main agreements within Treaty 1. However, due to the different intentions and understandings of the Canadian officials and the Indigenous communities at the time of its creation, this treaty continues to be considered controversial well into the 21st century.

== History ==
Also known as the Stone Fort Treaty, Treaty 1 would be the first treaty signed since the 1867 formation of the modern Canadian government and one year after the province of Manitoba was formed as a part of the Canadian Confederation.

=== Goals ===
The treaty was established between Canadian officials and the local Indigenous communities as both groups desired the security of land and resources. The Anishinaabe and Swampy Cree Nations sought to maintain their traditional lands while gaining security in transitioning to a new form of life with the arrival of settlers.

In its process of annexing the West, the Canadian government sought to assimilate the Indigenous peoples in their movement to settle prior areas of trade. Through the Numbered Treaties, Canadian officials sought a more diplomatic and the least resistant form of annexing land in the West after hearing about the many violent conflicts that erupted in the United States between American officials and Indigenous peoples.

In addition, Adams George Archibald, the first Lieutenant Governor of Manitoba, wanted to establish a treaty that would secure the government with land around Lake Winnipeg and the western side of the Red River Valley in order to build up agriculture and extract resources. For officials such as Archibald, the annexation of Western Canada was more concerned with developing agriculture and settlements rather than establishing trade, which had defined the economic landscape of the region for the past century.

=== Negotiations ===
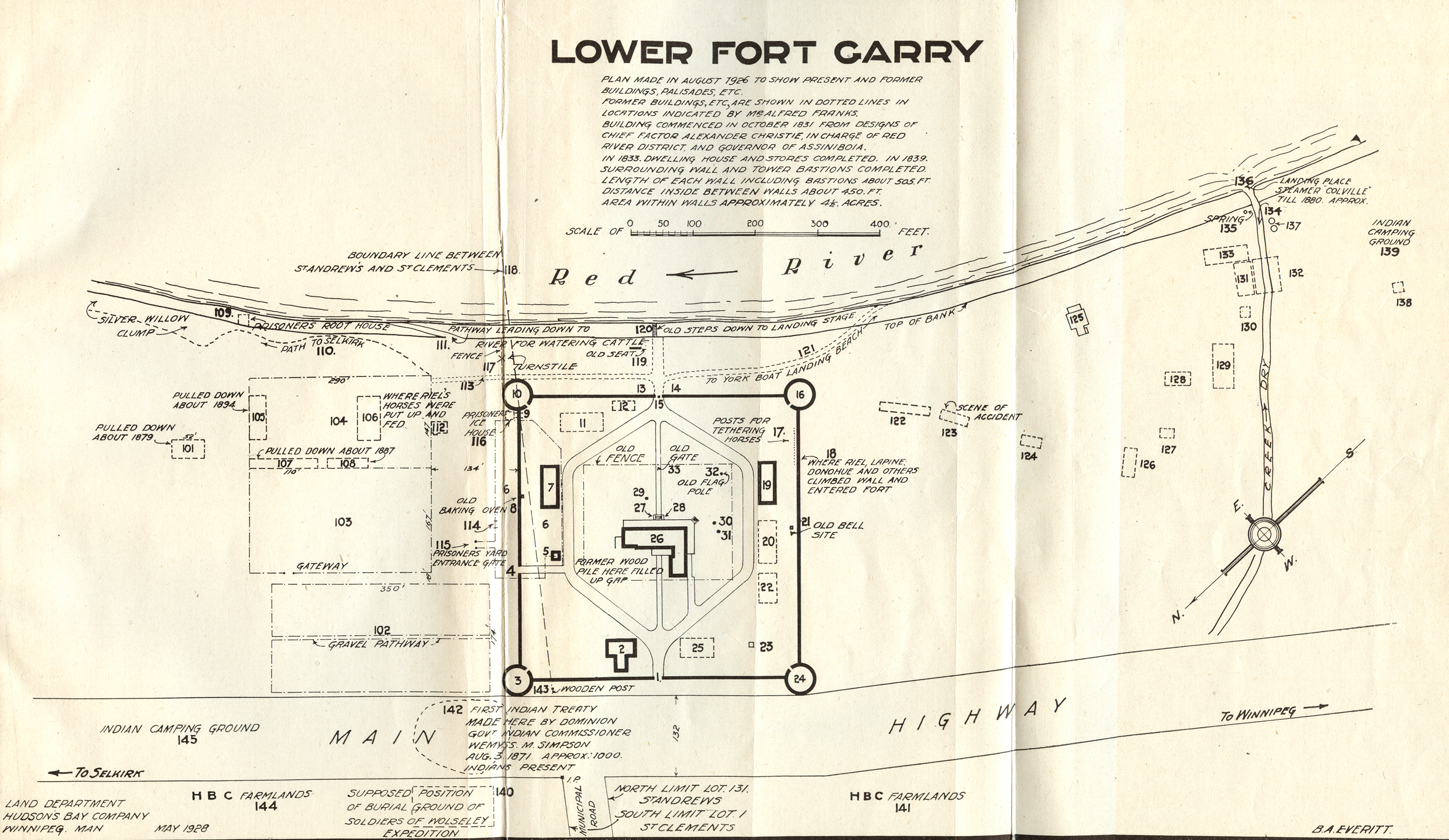
A plan of Lower Fort Garry

The negotiations of Treaty 1 spanned over a period of eight days from July 27 to August 3, 1871. Led by governor Archibald and his commissioner Wemyss Simpson, the Canadian government invited the Indigenous communities to attend negotiations for a treaty at Lower Fort Garry (or Stone Fort). Approximately one thousand Indigenous individuals attended including adults and children, who were led by a number of chiefs that included Mis-koo-kenew or Red Eagle (also known as Henry Prince).

In his opening comments that would later cause lasting confusion, Archibald referenced Queen Victoria as the "Great Mother [who] wanted to deal fairly" with the Indigenous peoples, supporting their needs, and hoping they would adopt agricultural practises. The governor then went on to lay out both his and the Canadian government's terms of negotiations, including the introduction to the idea of reserves. He assured that Indigenous ways of life would be sustained as they would not be forced to adopt agriculture and could choose to live on reserves if they so wished. And in addition, they could continue to use their traditional land as they did in the past for hunting, fishing, and other means of sustaining their lifestyle

After listening to Archibald's speech, the Indigenous leaders returned several days later with their list of demands for the treaty that included guaranteeing large areas of land for each individual or family.

Archibald and the other Canadian officials, however, believed this demand to be too high, so they negotiated the land rights down to approximately "160 acres of land for a family of five"; which was similar to the land rights outlined in the Dominion Lands Act for British settlers. After much debating, the two sides came to an agreement and the treaty was signed August 3.

=== Articles and memorandum of Treaty 1 ===
The final articles of Treaty 1 were outlined as follows: the Indigenous peoples were to hand over a large portion of land in the southeast and south-central current-day Manitoba to Governor Archibald and the Crown. These lands were to include areas around Lake Manitoba and Winnipeg as well as around the Red River Valley.

In return, the Canadian government was to provide each band with a reserve large enough to accommodate each family of five with 160 acres (65 ha) of land (or a larger or smaller amount based on the size of the family). In addition, each member of these bands were to be given a gratuity of three dollars in accordance with a yearly sum of fifteen dollars based on a family of five. This annual payment could be provided in cash or items such as clothing, blankets, or hunting supplies based upon the desires of the family. The government also could provide and maintain a school on each reserve if one was desired. And the Crown would prohibit the introduction and sale of alcohol on reserves.

=== The Outside Promises ===
Within a year of the signing of Treaty 1, word reached Governor Archibald that the Swampy Cree and Anishinaabe peoples were declaring that some of the treaty terms were not being fulfilled. Known as the "Outside Promises", numerous items the Indigenous peoples were promised beyond the written text of the treaty had not been provided to them yet. These items included distinguished clothing for Chiefs and their councilors, farming supplies such as ploughs, and animals like oxen and cows for their agricultural needs.

While a new commissioner was appointed to deal with the needs of the Indigenous peoples in the area and the issue was brought to court, the federal government did not resolve the "Outside Promises" until April 30, 1875, four years later. It was then the council passed an order that stated that the memorandum of items orally promised to the bands were to be considered a part of Treaty 1 and therefore had to be carried out by the commissioner. Additionally, the annuity of three dollars to each band member was to be raised to five dollars a year. Finally, the order stated that each Chief was to be provided with additional payments of twenty dollars annually as well as be given extra items of clothing in addition to those stated in the memorandum.

=== Significance of Treaty 1 ===
The signing of Treaty 1 marked the beginning of a long list of treaties that were to come over the next couple of decades, signifying the Canadian government's growing interest in the West as more than just a trading hub but as a suitable place for developing agriculture and growing populations of settlers; as well as a peaceful means to annex land. For Governor Adams Archibald the treaty would enable him to develop businesses such as mills and farms on the fertile land around Lakes Winnipeg and Manitoba and in the Red River Valley.

For the Anishinaabe and Swampy Cree Nations, Treaty 1 held a much larger significance. They believed it was a way for them to survive and adjust into a new way of living with the drastic changes that were coming to their land and that were already beginning to take shape. Their leaders believed a treaty with the Crown would help give them security when the large groups of settlers would make their way into the land. In addition, the Indigenous peoples believed that the treaty would also help elevate the threat of the serious decline of buffalo populations, which threatened their way of life. Ultimately, in signing the treaty the Indigenous leaders hoped to gain a connection with the "Great White Queen Mother" that would ensure security and benefits for their people.

== Controversy ==
Treaty 1 is considered controversial due to the differing understandings of the treaty and what agreements were entailed within it.

=== Final contract or covenantal relationships ===
The Canadian government and its negotiators viewed the treaty as a mere contract in which the Anishinaabe peoples surrendered land over to them in exchange for compensation. In addition, they viewed the signing of the treaty as "finalizing" or the end of negotiations and relations with the Indigenous peoples in this area. For the Anishinaabe, however, the treaty held a much greater significance as they regarded it as a "Creator-sanctioned covenant" that would guarantee the continuation of their livelihood. Unlike the Canadian government, the Anishinaabe also saw the agreement as the beginning of a continuing relationship with the government in which both groups would provide benefits and maintain coexistence with each other.

=== Property rights under differing legal frameworks ===
Much of the confusion, disagreements, and misinterpretations of the treaty revolved around the different understandings of the parameters of the agreement. Mainly this involved the two groups’ different viewpoints on the use of land and property ownership.

In the negotiations, the government officials put forward two Anglo concepts of land ownership which were: the Anishinaabe surrender of land to the government and the setting aside of land or reserves for the Indigenous peoples. The Anishinaabe viewed these proposals through their systems of inaakonigewin (law), in which they believed land to be not an exclusive and exclusionary possession of one person or party but a shared entity, such as other fundamental Earthly prerequisites of life including unpolluted air and water.

Based on the available evidence from the negotiations, it seems that, despite disagreements in the amounts of land to be provided within the tenets of the treaty, the Anishinaabe agreed to the terms of land division as they understood it as a treaty of non-interference and equality between themselves and incoming settlers; in which they shared land desired for agriculture while also being able to utilize land for their traditional activities. Essentially, the Anishinaabe did not view the agreements about giving the land to the government as the exclusionary surrender of their title to land, but the sharing of land and its resources.

The controversial and problematic nature of these land agreements results from British government officials not identifying or clarifying their historically distinctive concept of the land as alienable, exclusionary property, and therefore that the Anishinaabe giving over of land is in commercially biased common law a total surrender of it, excluding Indigenous people (among other living stakeholders) from its use, enjoyment, and management. Not only did the imperial British Crown act discreetly, but it also forwarded radical, bellicose senses of surrender and property in the seemingly-diplomatic making of treaties. In addition, the land agreements within the treaty are controversial, as it was never recorded that the Anishinaabe agreed to surrender their land to the Canadian government that the British Crown later was party to creating.

=== Kinship and the Great Mother ===
Treaty 1 also remains controversial due to the differing understandings of kinship, the role of the "Great Mother" and her promises.

As with Governor Archibald's opening statement on the "Great Mother", government officials utilized this term throughout the negotiations of the treaty simply as a way to connect with the Anishinaabe kinship language, which helped enable them to enter into these agreements.

For the Anishinaabe, the term held a much deeper significance as, based on their kinship relations and duties, the "Great Mother" or Queen acted as a symbolic figure who would treat their peoples with kindness, respect, and as equals, listening and aiding them with their needs. It was through this figure that the Anishinaabe understood the treaty as one of mutual respect, shared resources, and support in their needs with the Canadian government.

However, due to the events of the memorandum of 1875 and the additional unfulfilled promises to the Anishinaabe beyond the written treaty, the Canadian government did not find significance in the promises of the "Great Mother".

== List of Treaty 1 First Nations ==
- Brokenhead Ojibway Nation
- Fort Alexander (Sagkeeng First Nation)
- Long Plain First Nation
- Peguis First Nation
- Roseau River Anishinaabe First Nation
- Sandy Bay First Nation
- Swan Lake First Nation

== See also ==
- Treaty 2
- Treaty 3
