= List of Indigenous Canadian films =

This is a list of Indigenous Canadian films, including First Nations, Métis and Inuit films.

== 0–9 ==
| Title | Director | Year | Genre | Notes | Ref |
|---|---|---|---|---|---|
| 3 Indian Tales (3 histoires d'indiens) | Robert Morin | 2014 | Docufiction | | |

== A ==
| Title | Director | Year | Genre | Notes | Ref |
|---|---|---|---|---|---|
| Aberdeen | Ryan Cooper, Eva Thomas | 2024 | Drama | | |
| After the Last River | Victoria Lean | 2015 | Documentary | | |
| Aitamaako'tamisskapi Natosi: Before the Sun | Banchi Hanuse | 2023 | Documentary | | |
| Aki | Darlene Naponse | 2025 | Documentary | | |
| Amisk | Alanis Obomsawin | 1977 | Documentary | | |
| Ancestral Beasts | Tim Riedel | 2026 | Horror | | |
| Ancestral Threads | Sean Stiller | 2023 | Short documentary | | |
| Angakusajaujuq: The Shaman's Apprentice | Zacharias Kunuk | 2021 | Animated short | | |
| Angela's Shadow | Jules Arita Koostachin | 2024 | Thriller drama | | |
| Angelique's Isle | Marie-Hélène Cousineau, Michelle Derosier | 2018 | Drama | | |
| Angry Inuk | Alethea Arnaquq-Baril | 2016 | Documentary | | |
| Arctic Song | Germaine Arnattaujuq, Neil Christopher, Louise Flaherty | 2022 | Animated short | | |
| At the Place of Ghosts (Sk+te'kmujue'katik) | Bretten Hannam | 2025 | Thriller | | |
| Atanarjuat: The Fast Runner | Zacharias Kunuk | 2001 | Drama | | |
| Atikamekw Suns (Soleils Atikamekw) | Chloé Leriche | 2023 | Drama | | |

== B ==
| Title | Director | Year | Genre | Notes | Ref |
|---|---|---|---|---|---|
| Backroads | Shirley Cheechoo | 2000 | Drama | | |
| The Ballad of Crowfoot | Willie Dunn | 1968 | Documentary | | |
| Balmoral Hotel | Wayne Wapeemukwa | 2015 | Short drama | | |
| Basket (Lhk'wál'us) | Alanis Obomsawin | 1975 | Documentary | | |
| Beautiful Scars | Shane Belcourt | 2022 | Documentary | Profile of Tom Wilson | |
| Beans | Tracey Deer | 2020 | Drama | | |
| Before Tomorrow (Le jour avant le lendemain) | Marie-Hélène Cousineau, Madeline Ivalu | 2008 | Drama | | |
| Before the Streets | Chloé Leriche | 2016 | Drama | | |
| Behind the Facade | Banchi Hanuse | 2021 | Documentary | | |
| Between Two Worlds | Barry Greenwald | 1990 | Documentary | | |
| Biidaaban (The Dawn Comes) | Amanda Strong | 2018 | Animation | | |
| Biidaaban: First Light | Lisa Jackson | 2018 | Virtual reality | | |
| Bill Reid Remembers | Alanis Obomsawin | 2022 | Documentary | | |
| The Birds Who Fear Death | Sanjay Patel | 2024 | Drama | | |
| Birth of a Family | Tasha Hubbard | 2017 | Documentary | | |
| Black Robe | Bruce Beresford | 1991 | Drama | | |
| Blood Lines | Gail Maurice | 2025 | Drama | | |
| Blood Quantum | Jeff Barnaby | 2019 | Horror | | |
| The Body Remembers When the World Broke Open | Elle-Máijá Tailfeathers, Kathleen Hepburn | 2019 | Drama | | |
| Boil Alert | Stevie Salas, James Burns | 2023 | Documentary | | |
| Bones of Crows | Marie Clements | 2022 | Drama | | |
| Bootlegger | Caroline Monnet | 2021 | Drama | | |
| Braiding Knowledge Through Breath, Language, and Movement | Jessica Barudin | 2023 | Short documentary | | |
| Brocket 99: Rockin' the Country | Nilesh Patel | 2006 | Documentary | | |
| Broken Angel (MaaShwaKanManiTo) | Jules Arita Koostachin | 2022 | Drama | | |
| Brother, I Cry | Jessie Anthony | 2020 | Drama | | |
| Buffy Sainte-Marie: Carry It On | Madison Thomas | 2022 | Documentary | | |

== C ==
| Title | Director | Year | Genre | Notes | Ref |
|---|---|---|---|---|---|
| Café Daughter | Shelley Niro | 2023 | Drama | Fictionalized account of the childhood of Senator Lillian Dyck | |
| Call Me Human (Je m'appelle humain) | Kim O'Bomsawin | 2020 | Documentary | | |
| The Canoe | Alanis Obomsawin | 1972 | Documentary | | |
| Carcajou et le péril blanc | Arthur Lamothe | 1973–1976 | Documentary | Multi-film series | |
| The Cave (?E?anx) | Helen Haig-Brown | 2009 | Science fiction | | |
| Ceremony | Banchi Hanuse | 2026 | Documentary | | |
| Chaakapesh | Roger Frappier, Justin Kingsley | 2019 | Documentary | | |
| Children | Alanis Obomsawin | 1972 | Documentary | | |
| Choke | Michelle Latimer | 2011 | Animated short | | |
| Christmas at Moose Factory | Alanis Obomsawin | 1971 | Documentary | | |
| Circle of the Sun | Colin Low | 1960 | Documentary | | |
| Clearcut | Ryszard Bugajski | 1991 | Thriller | | |
| Club Native | Tracey Deer | 2008 | Documentary | | |
| Cold Road | Kelvin Redvers | 2024 | Thriller | | |
| Colonization Road | Michelle St. John | 2016 | Documentary | | |
| The Colony | Jeff Barnaby | 2007 | Drama | | |
| Coming Home: Wanna Icipus Kupi | Erica Marie Daniels | 2023 | Documentary | Released in conjunction with the scripted drama series Little Bird | |
| Conspiracy of Silence | Francis Mankiewicz | 1991 | Drama | | |
| The Corruption of Divine Providence | Jeremy Torrie | 2020 | Horror | | |
| Crazywater | Dennis Allen | 2013 | Documentary | | |
| Cree Hunters of Mistassini | Boyce Richardson, Tony Ianzelo | 1974 | Documentary | | |
| Cry Rock | Banchi Hanuse | 2010 | Documentary | | |

== D ==
| Title | Director | Year | Genre | Notes | Ref |
|---|---|---|---|---|---|
| Dance Me Outside | Bruce McDonald | 1994 | Drama | | |
| Deaner '89 | Sam McGlynn | 2024 | Comedy | | |
| Deep Inside Clint Star | Clint Alberta | 1999 | Documentary | | |
| Le Dep | Sonia Boileau | 2015 | Drama | | |
| Divided Loyalties | Mario Azzopardi | 1990 | Drama | | |
| Do Not Tell (Ne le dis pas / Nika tshika uiten mishkut) | Jani Bellefleur-Kaltush | 2009 | Short drama | | |
| Dreamspeaker | Claude Jutra | 1976 | Drama | | |

== E ==
| Title | Director | Year | Genre | Notes | Ref |
|---|---|---|---|---|---|
| Edge of the Knife | Gwaai Edenshaw, Helen Haig-Brown | 2018 | Drama | | |
| Elijah | Paul Unwin | 2007 | Comedy-drama | | |
| Êmîcêtôcêt: Many Bloodlines | Theola Ross | 2020 | Short documentary | | |
| Empire of Dirt | Peter Stebbings | 2013 | Drama | | |
| Endless Cookie | Seth Scriver, Peter Scriver | 2025 | Animated, documentary | | |
| Eskimo Artist: Kenojuak | John Feeney | 1964 | Short documentary | | |
| Etthén Heldeli: Caribou Eaters | Ian Toews | 2018 | Documentary | | |
| Ever Deadly | Chelsea McMullan, Tanya Tagaq | 2022 | Documentary | | |

== F ==
| Title | Director | Year | Genre | Notes | Ref |
|---|---|---|---|---|---|
| Falls Around Her | Darlene Naponse | 2018 | Drama | | |
| Farming (Lep'cál) | Alanis Obomsawin | 1975 | Documentary | | |
| Fast Horse | Alexandra Lazarowich | 2018 | Documentary | | |
| File Under Miscellaneous | Jeff Barnaby | 2010 | Short drama | | |
| Les Filles du Roi | Corey Payette | 2023 | Musical drama | | |
| Finality of Dusk | Madison Thomas | 2023 | Science fiction | | |
| Finding Dawn | Christine Welsh | 2006 | Documentary | | |
| Fire Song | Adam Garnet Jones | 2015 | Drama | | |
| Fish Hawk | Donald Shebib | 1979 | Drama | | |
| Flood | Amanda Strong | 2017 | Animated short | | |
| Footprints (L'Empreinte) | Yvan Dubuc, Carole Poliquin | 2015 | Documentary | | |
| For Angela | Daniel Prouty, Nancy Trites Botkin | 1993 | Short drama | | |
| For John | Dale Montour | 2003 | Short documentary | | |
| Forbidden Music | Barbara Hager | 2025 | Documentary | | |
| Foster Child | Gil Cardinal | 1987 | Documentary | | |
| Fractured Land | Fiona Rayher, Damien Gillis | 2015 | Documentary | | |
| From Cherry English | Jeff Barnaby | 2004 | Short drama | | |
| Frost | Jeremy Ball | 2012 | Short drama | | |

== G ==
| Title | Director | Year | Genre | Notes | Ref |
|---|---|---|---|---|---|
| Gabriel Goes to the City | Alanis Obomsawin | 1979 | Documentary | | |
| Gene Boy Came Home | Alanis Obomsawin | 2007 | Documentary | | |
| Giant Bear | Neil Christopher, Daniel Gies | 2019 | Animated short | | |
| Ginger Snaps Back: The Beginning | Grant Harvey | 2004 | Horror | | |
| God's Lake Narrows | Kevin Lee Burton | 2011 | Documentary | | |
| The Gnawer of Rocks (Mangittatuarjuk) | Louise Flaherty | 2025 | Animated short | | |
| Great River | Matt LeMay | 2010 | Documentary | | |
| The Great Salish Heist | Darrell Dennis | 2024 | Crime comedy | | |
| Grey Owl | Richard Attenborough | 1999 | Drama | | |
| The Grizzlies | Miranda de Pencier | 2018 | Drama | | |

== H ==
| Title | Director | Year | Genre | Notes | Ref |
|---|---|---|---|---|---|
| Hank Williams First Nation | Aaron James Sorensen | 2004 | Comedy | | |
| Heaven's Floor | Lori Stoll | 2016 | Drama | | |
| Hey, Viktor! | Cody Lightning | 2023 | Comedy | | |
| Hi-Ho Mistahey! | Alanis Obomsawin | 2013 | Documentary | | |
| Hiawatha, the Messiah of the Ojibway | Joe Rosenthal | 1903 | Short drama | | |
| High Steel | Don Owen | 1965 | Short documentary | | |
| Highway of Tears | Matt Smiley | 2015 | Documentary | | |
| History of Manawan, Part 1 | Alanis Obomsawin | 1972 | Documentary | | |
| History of Manawan, Part 2 | Alanis Obomsawin | 1972 | Documentary | | |
| Hochelaga, Land of Souls | François Girard | 2017 | Drama | | |
| Honour to Senator Murray Sinclair | Alanis Obomsawin | 2021 | Documentary | | |
| How People Got Fire | Daniel Janke | 2008 | Animated short | | |
| How to Build an Igloo | Douglas Wilkinson | 1949 | Short documentary | | |
| How We Stand | Marie Clements | 2026 | Drama | | |

== I ==
| Title | Director | Year | Genre | Notes | Ref |
|---|---|---|---|---|---|
| If the Weather Permits | Elisapie Isaac | 2003 | Documentary | | |
| In a World Created by a Drunken God | John Hazlett | 2008 | Drama | | |
| In Alaska | Jaap van Heusden, Vinnie Karetak | 2026 | Drama | Canadian-Dutch coproduction | |
| In the Heart of the South | Nyla Innuksuk | 2026 | Thriller | | |
| In the Land of the Head Hunters | Edward S. Curtis | 1914 | Drama | | |
| In the Valley of Wild Horses | Asia Youngman, Trevor Mack | 2018 | Short documentary | | |
| Incident at Restigouche | Alanis Obomsawin | 1984 | Documentary | | |
| Inconvenient Indian | Michelle Latimer | 2020 | Documentary | | |
| The Incredible 25th Year of Mitzi Bearclaw | Shelley Niro | 2019 | Comedy | | |
| Indian Horse | Stephen Campanelli | 2017 | Drama | | |
| Indian Road Trip | Allan W. Hopkins | 2020 | Comedy | | |
| Inendi | Sarain Fox | 2020 | Documentary | | |
| The Inhuman (L'Inhumain) | Jason Brennan | 2021 | Thriller | | |
| Inkwo for When the Starving Return | Amanda Strong | 2024 | Animated short | | |
| Innu Nikamu: Resist and Sing | Kevin Bacon-Hervieux | 2017 | Documentary | | |
| The Invisible Nation (Le Peuple invisible) | Richard Desjardins, Robert Monderie | 2007 | Documentary | | |
| Inuuvunga: I Am Inuk, I Am Alive | Daniel Cross, Mila Aung-Thwin, Brett Gaylor | 2004 | Documentary | | |
| Iqaluit | Benoît Pilon | 2016 | Drama | | |
| Is the Crown at War with Us? | Alanis Obomsawin | 2002 | Documentary | | |
| Isaac Littlefeathers | Les Rose | 1984 | Drama | | |
| Islet (Îlot) | Nicolas Brault | 2003 | Animated short | | |
| The Issue with Tissue | Michael Zelniker | 2022 | Documentary | | |

== J ==
| Title | Director | Year | Genre | Notes | Ref |
|---|---|---|---|---|---|
| James Bay 1975: The Shock of Two Nations (Baie James 1975 : le choc des nations) | Mélanie Lameboy, Myriam Berthelet, Mathieu Fournier | 2025 | Documentary | | |
| Jeffrey's Turn | Glen Gould | 2026 | Drama | | |
| Jesse Jams | Trevor Anderson | 2020 | Short documentary | | |
| Johnny Greyeyes | Jorge Manzano | 2000 | Drama | | |
| Johnny Tootall | Shirley Cheechoo | 2005 | Drama | | |
| Jordan River Anderson, the Messenger | Alanis Obomsawin | 2019 | Documentary | | |
| The Journals of Knud Rasmussen | Zacharias Kunuk | 2006 | Drama | | |
| June in Povungnituk | Alanis Obomsawin | 1980 | Documentary | | |

== K ==
| Title | Director | Year | Genre | Notes | Ref |
|---|---|---|---|---|---|
| Kabloonak | Claude Massot | 1994 | Drama | | |
| Kajutaijuq: The Spirit That Comes | Scott Brachmayer | 2014 | Short drama | | |
| Kanehsatake: 270 Years of Resistance | Alanis Obomsawin | 1993 | Documentary | | |
| Katshinau (Les Mains sales) | Jani Bellefleur-Kaltush, Julien G. Marcotte | 2023 | Short drama | | |
| Kayak to Klemtu | Zoe Leigh Hopkins | 2022 | Drama | | |
| Kikkik | Ole Gjerstad | 2000 (English); 2002 (Inuktitut) | Documentary | | |
| Kímmapiiyipitssini: The Meaning of Empathy | Elle-Máijá Tailfeathers | 2021 | Documentary | | |
| Kissed by Lightning | Shelley Niro | 2009 | Drama | | |
| Kivitoo: What They Thought of Us | Zacharias Kunuk | 2018 | Documentary | | |
| The Klabona Keepers | Tamo Campos, Jasper Snow-Rosen | 2022 | Documentary | | |
| Klee | Gavin Baird | 2025 | Short horror | | |
| Koneline: Our Land Beautiful | Nettie Wild | 2016 | Documentary | | |
| Kuessipan | Myriam Verreault | 2019 | Drama | | |

== L ==
| Title | Director | Year | Genre | Notes | Ref |
|---|---|---|---|---|---|
| Labrador: Autopsy of Silence | Rodrigue Jean | 2026 | Thriller drama | | |
| The Legend of Sarila | Nancy Florence Savard | 2013 | Animated | | |
| Lelum' | Asia Youngman | 2017 | Short documentary | | |
| The Lesser Blessed | Anita Doron | 2012 | Drama | | |
| The Living Stone | John Feeney | 1958 | Short documentary | | |
| Living With Giants | Aude Leroux-Lévesque, Sébastien Rist | 2016 | Documentary | | |
| The Loon's Necklace | F. R. Crawley | 1948 | Short drama | | |
| Luk'Luk'I | Wayne Wapeemukwa | 2017 | Drama | | |

== M ==
| Title | Director | Year | Genre | Notes | Ref |
|---|---|---|---|---|---|
| Maïna | Michel Poulette | 2013 | Drama | | |
| Map of the Human Heart | Vincent Ward | 1992 | Drama | | |
| Martha of the North | Marquise Lepage | 2009 | Documentary | | |
| Meadowlarks | Tasha Hubbard | 2025 | Drama | Narrative fiction debut of Hubbard, better known as a documentary filmmaker | |
| Meneath: The Hidden Island of Ethics | Terril Calder | 2021 | Animated short | | |
| Mesnak | Yves Sioui Durand | 2011 | Drama | | |
| Mission of Fear (Astataïon, ou Le Festin des morts) | Fernand Dansereau | 1965 | Drama | | |
| Moccasin Flats: Redemption | Rob W. King | 2008 | Drama | | |
| Mohawk Girls | Tracey Deer | 2005 | Documentary | Later spun off into a television series | |
| Monkey Beach | Loretta Todd | 2020 | Drama | | |
| MONSTR | Tank Standing Buffalo | 2023 | Animated short | | |
| Moose Call | Alanis Obomsawin | 1972 | Documentary | | |
| Mother of Many Children | Alanis Obomsawin | 1977 | Documentary | | |
| Mount Currie Summer Camp | Alanis Obomsawin | 1975 | Documentary | | |
| My Favourite Food Is Indian Tacos, My Favourite Drink Is Iced Tea and My Favourite Thing Is Drumming | Derius Matchewan | 2019 | Short | | |
| My Indian Name | Abraham Côté | 2022 | Documentary | | |
| My Name Is Kahentiiosta | Alanis Obomsawin | 1995 | Documentary | | |

== N ==
| Title | Director | Year | Genre | Notes | Ref |
|---|---|---|---|---|---|
| Nahanni: River of Forgiveness | Geoff Bowie | 2019 | Documentary | | |
| Nalujuk Night | Jennie Williams | 2021 | Short documentary | | |
| nanekawâsis | Conor McNally | 2024 | Documentary | | |
| The Necessities of Life (Ce qu'il faut pour vivre) | Benoît Pilon | 2008 | Drama | | |
| Nechako: It Will Be a Big River Again | Lyana Patrick | 2025 | Documentary | | |
| Ni-Naadamaadiz: Red Power Rising | Shane Belcourt | 2025 | Documentary | | |
| Night Raiders | Danis Goulet | 2021 | Science fiction | | |
| NIGIQTUG ᓂᒋᖅᑐᖅ (The South Wind) | Lindsay McIntyre | 2023 | Short drama | | |
| Nika and Madison | Eva Thomas | 2025 | Crime thriller | | |
| Nikamowin (Song) | Kevin Lee Burton | 2007 | Short documentary | | |
| NiiMisSak: Sisters in Film | Jules Koostachin | 2024 | Documentary | | |
| Ninan Auassat: We, the Children (Ninan Auassat: Nous, les enfants) | Kim O'Bomsawin | 2024 | Documentary | | |
| Nîpawistamâsowin: We Will Stand Up | Tasha Hubbard | 2019 | Documentary | | |
| No Address | Alanis Obomsawin | 1988 | Documentary | | |
| North Mountain | Bretten Hannam | 2015 | Action thriller | | |
| Nouveau Québec | Sarah Fortin | 2021 | Drama | | |
| Now Is the Time | Christopher Auchter | 2019 | Short documentary | | |
| Nuhoniyeh: Our Story | Mary Code, Allen Code | 1992 | Documentary | | |
| Nuliajuk: Mother of the Sea Beasts | John Houston | 2001 | Documentary | | |
| Nuxalk Radio | Banchi Hanuse | 2020 | Short documentary | | |
| N'xaxaitkw | Asia Youngman | 2022 | Short drama | | |

== O ==
| Title | Director | Year | Genre | Notes | Ref |
|---|---|---|---|---|---|
| Okpik's Dream | Laura Rietveld | 2015 | Documentary | | |
| Old Crow | Alanis Obomsawin | 1979 | Documentary | | |
| On the Corner | Nathaniel Geary | 2003 | Drama | | |
| On the Trail of the Far Fur Country | Kevin Nikkel | 2014 | Documentary | | |
| One Day in the Life of Noah Piugattuk | Zacharias Kunuk | 2019 | Drama | | |
| One of Ours | Yasmine Mathurin | 2021 | Documentary | | |
| Our Nationhood | Alanis Obomsawin | 2003 | Documentary | | |
| Our People Will Be Healed | Alanis Obomsawin | 2017 | Documentary | | |
| Out in the Cold | Colleen Murphy | 2008 | Drama | | |
| The Owl Who Married a Goose: An Eskimo Legend | Caroline Leaf | 1974 | Animated short | | |

== P ==
| Title | Director | Year | Genre | Notes | Ref |
|---|---|---|---|---|---|
| Pale Face (Visage pâle) | Claude Gagnon | 1985 | Drama | | |
| Partridge | Alanis Obomsawin | 1972 | Documentary | | |
| The Pass System | Alex Williams | 2015 | Documentary | | |
| Passage | John Walker | 2008 | Documentary | | |
| People of a Feather | Joel Heath | 2011 | Documentary | | |
| The People of the Kattawapiskak River | Alanis Obomsawin | 2012 | Documentary | | |
| Pidikwe (Rumble) | Caroline Monnet | 2025 | Documentary | | |
| Piluk | Marc Séguin, Elisapie Isaac | 2026 | Animated short | | |
| A Place Between: The Story of an Adoption | Curtis Kaltenbaugh | 2007 | Documentary | | |
| Portraits from a Fire | Trevor Mack | 2021 | Comedy-drama | | |
| Poundmaker's Lodge: A Healing Place | Alanis Obomsawin | 1987 | Documentary | | |
| Power | Magnus Isacsson | 1996 | Documentary | | |
| The Pretendians | Drew Hayden Taylor, Paul Kemp | 2022 | Documentary | | |
| Puberty, Part 1 | Alanis Obomsawin | 1975 | Documentary | | |
| Puberty, Part 2 | Alanis Obomsawin | 1975 | Documentary | | |

== Q ==
| Title | Director | Year | Genre | Notes | Ref |
|---|---|---|---|---|---|
| Qallunaat! Why White People Are Funny | Mark Sandiford, Zebedee Nungak | 2006 | Documentary | | |
| Qimmit, a Clash of Two Truths | Joelie Sanguya, Ole Gjerstad | 2010 | Documentary | | |
| Québékoisie | Mélanie Carrier, Olivier Higgins | 2013 | Documentary | | |
| Québexit | Joshua Demers | 2020 | Comedy | | |
| Quiet Killing (Ce silence qui tue) | Kim O'Bomsawin | 2018 | Documentary | | |

== R ==
| Title | Director | Year | Genre | Notes | Ref |
|---|---|---|---|---|---|
| Red | Gilles Carle | 1970 | Drama | | |
| Red Fever | Neil Diamond, Catherine Bainbridge | 2024 | Documentary | | |
| Red Snow | Marie Clements | 2019 | Drama | | |
| Redlights | Eva Thomas | 2023 | Short drama | | |
| Reel Injun | Neil Diamond, Catherine Bainbridge, Jeremiah Hayes | 2009 | Documentary | | |
| Restless River (La rivière sans repos) | Marie-Hélène Cousineau, Madeline Ivalu | 2019 | Drama | | |
| Returning Home | Sean Stiller | 2021 | Documentary | | |
| Rez Ball | Sydney Freeland | 2024 | Drama | | |
| Rhymes for Young Ghouls | Jeff Barnaby | 2013 | Drama | | |
| Richard Cardinal: Cry from a Diary of a Métis Child | Alanis Obomsawin | 1986 | Documentary | | |
| Riel | George Bloomfield | 1979 | Drama | | |
| RKLSS | Tank Standing Buffalo | 2020 | Animated short | | |
| The Road Forward | Marie Clements | 2017 | Documentary | | |
| The Road to Webequie | Tess Girard, Ryan Noth | 2016 | Short documentary | | |
| Roberta | Caroline Monnet | 2014 | Short drama | | |
| Rocks at Whiskey Trench | Alanis Obomsawin | 2000 | Documentary | | |
| The Romance of the Far Fur Country | Harold M. Wyckoff | 1920 | Documentary | | |
| Rosie | Gail Maurice | 2022 | Comedy-drama | | |
| Round Up | Narcisse Blood | 2010 | Short documentary | | |
| Rumble: The Indians Who Rocked the World | Catherine Bainbridge, Alfonso Maiorana | 2017 | Documentary | | |
| Run Woman Run | Zoe Leigh Hopkins | 2021 | Drama | | |
| Rustic Oracle | Sonia Boileau | 2019 | Drama | | |

== S ==
| Title | Director | Year | Genre | Notes | Ref |
|---|---|---|---|---|---|
| Ste. Anne | Rhayne Vermette | 2021 | Experimental, drama | | |
| Saints and Warriors | Patrick Shannon | 2025 | Documentary | | |
| Salmon (Tsúqwaoz') | Alanis Obomsawin | 1975 | Documentary | | |
| Savage | Lisa Jackson | 2009 | Short drama | | |
| SAVJ | Tank Standing Buffalo | 2022 | Animated short | | |
| Scarborough | Shasha Nakhai, Rich Williamson | 2021 | Drama | | |
| The Scattering of Man (DƏNE YI'INJETL) | Luke Gleeson | 2021 | Documentary | | |
| Searchers (Maliglutit) | Zacharias Kunuk | 2016 | Drama | | |
| Secret Path | Gord Downie | 2016 | Animated | | |
| Seeds | Kaniehtiio Horn | 2024 | Comedy | | |
| Seventeen | Justin Ducharme | 2026 | Drama | | |
| Sigwan | Alanis Obomsawin | 2005 | Short drama | | |
| Siksikakowan: The Blackfoot Man | Sinakson Trevor Solway | 2025 | Documentary | | |
| Singing Back the Buffalo | Tasha Hubbard | 2024 | Documentary | | |
| Sirmilik | Zacharias Kunuk | 2011 | Short documentary | | |
| #skoden | Damien Eagle Bear | 2025 | Documentary | | |
| Smudge the Blades | Cody Lightning | 2026 | Sports comedy-drama | | |
| Snip | Terril Calder | 2016 | Animated short | | |
| Snowshoes | Alanis Obomsawin | 2005 | Documentary | | |
| So Surreal: Behind the Masks | Neil Diamond, Joanne Robertson | 2024 | Documentary | | |
| Sol | Marie-Hélène Cousineau, Susan Avingaq | 2014 | Documentary | | |
| Spirit to Soar | Tanya Talaga, Michelle Derosier | 2021 | Documentary | | |
| Spudwrench: Kahnawake Man | Alanis Obomsawin | 1997 | Documentary | | |
| The Stand | Christopher Auchter | 2024 | Documentary | | |
| Standing Alone | Colin Low | 1982 | Documentary | | |
| Starwalker | Corey Payette | 2025 | Musical drama | | |
| Stellar | Darlene Naponse | 2022 | Drama | | |
| Stryker | Noam Gonick | 2004 | Drama | | |
| Sweet Summer Pow Wow | Darrell Dennis | 2025 | Romance | | |
| The Sun at Midnight | Kirsten Carthew | 2016 | Drama | | |
| Survivors Rowe | Daniel Roher | 2015 | Documentary | | |

== T ==
| Title | Director | Year | Genre | Notes | Ref |
|---|---|---|---|---|---|
| Tautuktavuk (What We See) | Carol Kunnuk, Lucy Tulugarjuk | 2023 | Drama | | |
| Tea Creek | Ryan Dickie | 2024 | Documentary | | |
| There Are No Fakes | Jamie Kastner | 2019 | Documentary | | |
| There Is a House Here | Alan Zweig | 2017 | Documentary | | |
| They Are Sacred (Ils sont sacrés) | Kim O'Bomsawin | 2025 | Documentary | | |
| This Ink Runs Deep | Asia Youngman | 2019 | Short documentary | | |
| This Place | V. T. Nayani | 2022 | Drama | | |
| This River | Katherena Vermette | 2016 | Short documentary | | |
| This Was the Time | Eugene Boyko | 1970 | Short documentary | | |
| Those Damned Savages (Les maudits sauvages) | Jean Pierre Lefebvre | 1971 | Drama | | |
| Those Who Come, Will Hear (Ceux qui viendront, l'entendront) | Simon Plouffe | 2018 | Documentary | | |
| Three Feathers | Carla Ulrich | 2018 | Drama | | |
| Three Thousand | Asinnajaq | 2017 | Short documentary | | |
| Throat Singing in Kangirsuk (Katatjatuuk Kangirsumi) | Eva Kaukai, Manon Chamberland | 2019 | Short documentary | | |
| Throat Song | Miranda de Pencier | 2011 | Short drama | | |
| Through Black Spruce | Don McKellar | 2018 | Drama | | |
| Thunder Drum (Mémoire battante) | Arthur Lamothe | 1983 | Documentary | | |
| Tia and Piujuq | Lucy Tulugarjuk | 2018 | Children's drama | | |
| Tkaronto | Shane Belcourt | 2007 | Drama | | |
| Totem: The Return of the G'psgolox Pole | Gil Cardinal | 2003 | Short documentary | | |
| Totem: Return and Renewal | Gil Cardinal | 2007 | Short documentary | Sequel to the 2003 film | |
| Trial at Fortitude Bay | Vic Sarin | 1994 | Drama | | |
| Trick or Treaty? | Alanis Obomsawin | 2014 | Documentary | | |
| Trouble in the Garden | Roz Owen | 2018 | Drama | | |
| Tshiuetin | Caroline Monnet | 2016 | Short documentary | | |
| Tuktuq | Robin Aubert | 2016 | Docufiction | | |
| Turtle Island Rap | Alexandra Lazarowich | 2026 | Documentary | | |
| Twice Colonized | Lin Alluna | 2023 | Documentary | Canada-Denmark-Greenland coproduction | |
| Two Indians Talking | Sara McIntyre | 2010 | Comedy-drama | | |
| Two Soft Things, Two Hard Things | Mark Kenneth Woods, Michael Yerxa | 2016 | Documentary | | |
| Two Worlds Colliding | Tasha Hubbard | 2004 | Documentary | | |

== U ==
| Title | Director | Year | Genre | Notes | Ref |
|---|---|---|---|---|---|
| Unikkausivut: Sharing Our Stories | multiple | 2011 | multi-film compilation | | |
| Unnatural & Accidental | Carl Bessai | 2006 | Drama | | |
| Utshimassits: Place of the Boss | John Walker | 1996 | Documentary | | |
| Uulx: The Scratcher | Banchi Hanuse | 2015 | Documentary | | |
| Uvanga | Marie-Hélène Cousineau, Madeline Ivalu | 2013 | Drama | | |

== V ==
| Title | Director | Year | Genre | Notes | Ref |
|---|---|---|---|---|---|
| Vanishing Point | Stephen A. Smith, Julia Szucs | 2012 | Documentary | | |

== W ==
| Title | Director | Year | Genre | Notes | Ref |
|---|---|---|---|---|---|
| WaaPaKe | Jules Arita Koostachin | 2023 | Documentary | | |
| Waban-Aki: People from Where the Sun Rises | Alanis Obomsawin | 2006 | Documentary | | |
| Walker | Alanis Obomsawin | 1992 | Documentary | | |
| Wapawekka | Danis Goulet | 2010 | Short drama | | |
| Waseskun | Steve Patry | 2016 | Documentary | | |
| We Can't Make the Same Mistake Twice | Alanis Obomsawin | 2016 | Documentary | | |
| We Know the Truth: Stories to Inspire Reconciliation | Meagan Fiddler, Bertram Schneider | 2021 | Documentary | | |
| We Were Children | Tim Wolochatiuk | 2012 | Documentary | | |
| welima'q | shalan joudry | 2024 | Short documentary | | |
| What Good Canadians Do | Stephanie Joline | 2024 | Animated short | | |
| When All the Leaves Are Gone | Alanis Obomsawin | 2010 | Short drama | | |
| Where the Spirit Lives | Bruce Pittman | 1989 | Drama | | |
| The White Dawn | Philip Kaufman | 1974 | Drama | | |
| Wild Rice Harvest Kenora | Alanis Obomsawin | 1979 | Documentary | | |
| Wildhood | Bretten Hannam | 2021 | Drama | | |
| Wilfred Buck | Lisa Jackson | 2024 | Documentary | | |
| Windigo | Robert Morin | 1994 | Drama | | |
| Wochiigii lo: End of the Peace | Heather Hatch | 2021 | Documentary | | |
| Wrong Husband (Uiksaringitara) | Zacharias Kunuk | 2025 | Historical drama | | |

== X ==
| Title | Director | Year | Genre | Notes | Ref |
|---|---|---|---|---|---|
| Xusum | Alanis Obomsawin | 1975 | Documentary | | |

== Y ==
| Title | Director | Year | Genre | Notes | Ref |
|---|---|---|---|---|---|
| Yintah | Jennifer Wickham, Brenda Michell, Michael Toledano | 2024 | Documentary | | |
| You Are on Indian Land | Mike Kanentakeron Mitchell | 1969 | Documentary | | |
