= List of chiefs of Kashechewan First Nation =

This is a list of chiefs of Kashechewan First Nation, listing the chiefs and band councils that have governed the First Nation since it began having its own council separate from that of Fort Albany First Nation in 1977.

Under the Indian Act, band councils were elected once every two years. The 1995 election asked residents to vote on extending chiefs' term lengths to three years, a change which was adopted. Currently, and as early as August 2021, Kashechewan elects its chief and councillors following a custom election code. Elections are held every three years for one Chief, one Deputy Chief, and nine Councillors.

In 2007, the First Nation was placed under third-party management by the federal government, allowing an outside company, to control the First Nation's finances. Until 2014, the co-managing company was Crupi Consulting Group, who were replaced in spring 2014 with another company, Northern Logistics, which had previously co-managed the Nation in the 2003-2004 fiscal year.

Date of Selection	Chief	Councillors		Notes	Ref
June 21, 1977	Willie Wesley	George Wesley; Sinclair Williams; Bart Sutherland; Norman Wesley; Evadnay Friday; Fred Lazarus			
June 15, 1979	Silas Wesley	Andrew Reuben; William Wesley Sr.; Sinclair Wynne; Abraham Wynne; Paul Wesley; Danny Koosees			
June 2, 1981	Silas Wesley	Leo Friday; Daniel Wesley; Sinclair Wynne; Abraham Wynne; George Wesley; Fred Lazarus			
Date of Selection	Chief	Head councillor	Councillors	Notes	Ref
June 23, 1983	Dan Koosees	Sinclair Wynne	Alex Z. Wesley; Bertie Wynne; Paul P. Wesley; Willie Stephen; Sinclair Williams; Bartholomew Sutherland; Jonathon Solomon		
June 22, 1985	Dan Koosees	George Koosees	Sinclair Wynne; George Wesley; Philip Stephen; Simon P. Friday; Sinclair Wesley; John Matthew Wesley; John Hughie; Jonathon Solomon		
June 24, 1986	Leo Friday	Archie Wesley	Sinclair Wesley; Simon P. Friday; Jonathon Solomon; Walter Williams; Sinclair Williams; Willie M. Friday; David Friday; Daniel Wesley		
June 30, 1987	William Wesley Sr.	Archie Wesley	Sinclair Wynne; Jonathon Solomon; Walter Williams; George Kooses Sr.; Charlie Wynne; Silas Wesley; Willie Friday Jr.; Bertie Wynne	Walter Williams resigned in May 1988 and was replaced by George Wesley in a May 19 by-election.	
August 8, 1988	Leo Friday	Archie Wesley	Alex Z. Wesley; Philip Goodwin; Leo Metatawabin; George Wesley; George Kooses Sr.; Evadney Friday; Philip Hughie; Willie Friday Jr.; James E. Wesley	Chief Friday resigned on December 23, 1988, Head Councillor Archie Wesley resigned on December 27, 1988, and Evadney Friday resigned on January 3, 1989. Those three were replaced in a January 4, 1989 by-election.	
January 4, 1989 (by-election)	Jonathon Solomon	Joshua Stephen	Alex Z. Wesley; Philip Goodwin; Leo Metatawabin; George Wesley; George Kooses Sr.; John M. Wesley; Philip Hughie; Willie Friday Jr.; James E. Wesley	Alex Z. Wesley and George Wesley resigned in January 1990, triggering another by-election on January 22. On the day of that by-election, Chief Solomon also resigned.	
January 22, 1990 (by-election)	Silas Wesley	Joshua Stephen	Oliver Wesley; Philip Goodwin; Leo Metatawabin; Sandy Lazarus; George Kooses Sr.; John M. Wesley; Philip Hughie; Willie Friday Jr.; James E. Wesley		
January 25, 1991	Dan Koosees	William Sutherland	Alex Z. Wesley; Paul P. Wesley; John Hughie; Lawrence Goodwin; Roy Wynne Jr.; Sinclair Wynne; George Wesley; Alfred Lazarus; Eliza Mark		
Date of Selection	Chief	Deputy Chief	Councillors	Notes	Ref
1993	Andrew Reuben				
January 9, 1995	Oliver Wesley	George Hughie		This election included a question on the ballot about extending the Chief's term from two to three years. The results favoured a three-year term.	
	Dan Koosees			According to Mushkegowuk Council records, Koosees was chief in September 1999.	
	Leo Friday	Tony Wesley		According to Mushkegowuk Council records, Friday was chief as of August 30, 2000, September 2001, September 2002, and September 2003. He was also chief during the October 2005 water crisis. The Council's records also indicate that Tony Wesley was Deputy Chief in August 2000.	
2006	Jonathan Solomon				
2009	Jonathan Solomon				
August 2012	Derek Stephen				
August 2015	Leo Friday				
2018	Leo Friday	Hosea Wesley	Michael Goodwin; Wayne Lazarus; Freddy Wesley; John M. Wesley		
August 30, 2021	Gaius Wesley	Betsy Lazarus	Freddy Wesley; Sheperd Wynne; Wayne Lazarus; Abraham Wynne; Michael Goodwin; Henry Koosees; John M. Wesley; Lawrence Goodwin Sr.; Raven Friday		
August 31, 2024	Hosea Wesley	Wayne Lazarus			
