= First Nations Child and Family Caring Society =

The First Nations Child and Family Caring Society (also referred to as the Caring Society) is a Canadian non-profit organization focused on human rights for First Nations children and families. Their work uses a reconciliation-based framework to achieve its mission of promoting the well-being of First Nations communities through public education, policy guidance, research, and advocacy. The organization is currently headquartered in Ottawa, Ontario, Canada.

== History ==
The First Nations Child and Family Caring Society was founded in the Squamish First Nation in 1998, co-led by Gitxsan activist and professor, Cindy Blackstock. At a national meeting of First Nations Child and Family Service Agencies (FNCFSA), delegates agreed that the creation of a national networking body was needed to provide research, policy, and professional development, as well as bring about systematic change. A working group was established, and FNCFSA directors drafted the organization's mandate, values, and objectives.

In 1999, the Caring Society was approved at a meeting held in Kingsclear First Nation, and an interim board of directors were elected.

== Mission ==
The Caring Society's mission is to reduce inequities and promote culturally-grounded approaches to care through a reconciliation-based framework. They advocate for support of Indigenous families in culturally appropriate ways, and for Indigenous children to receive opportunities to thrive, be safe, and pursue their dreams.

The organization's work is based on values of love, respect, integrity, and cultural affirmation. It advances this mission through research, public education, advocacy, publishing resources, supporting community-led initiatives, and providing tools for educators, organizations, and advocates working with First Nations children and families.

== Jordan's Principle Advocacy ==
The Caring Society was involved in developing Jordan's Principle. This principle ensures that First Nations children have access to all public services without delays or denials due to jurisdictional disputes between the federal and provincial governments.

Jordan's Principle is named in honour of Jordan River Anderson, a child from Norway House Cree First Nation. He was born in 1999 with a rare medical condition, requiring him to be hospitalized for the first year of his life. However, Jordan remained in hospital long past his discharge date because neither the federal nor provincial government would take responsibility for funding his out-of-home care. The dispute led to Jordan's death at the age of 5, after he had never left the hospital. At Jordan's memorial service, Cindy Blackstock promised his family she would ensure Jordan's Principle was honoured so that no other child had to suffer.

The Caring Society offers a Jordan's Principle Scholarship for First Nations students studying children's health or children with disabilities.

== The Canadian Human Rights Tribunal Case ==
=== 2007–2016 ===
In 2007, the Caring Society and the Assembly of First Nations (AFN) filed a human rights complaint against the Government of Canada's Department of Indigenous Services, or the ISC (formerly the Department of Indigenous and Northern Affairs), for allegedly discriminating against First Nations children and families in the delivery of on-reserve child welfare services. ISC required FNCFS agencies serving children on reserve to follow provincial child welfare laws, but rely on low-level government funding that did not compare to that of children off-reserve. These inequitable practices violated the rights of 163,000 First Nations children under Jordan's Principle and violated the Canadian Human Rights Act (CHRA).

A month after the complaint, the Caring Society lost federal funding.

Arguments were heard by the court in 2014, as the Government of Canada had made eight unsuccessful attempts to have the case dismissed on technical grounds and breached the law three times.

In 2016, the Canadian Human Rights Tribunal ruled in favour of the complaint, finding Canada guilty of discrimination on the grounds of racial and national or ethnic origin. The court stated that the ISC was aware of its child welfare funding practices for 16 years and had the resources to solve the problem, but failed to take appropriate action. The Tribunal ordered the Canadian government to cease discriminatory conduct, arguing that the standard of substantive equality requires First Nations people to receive child and family services that adhere to their culture, history, and geography. Canada did not appeal the decision.

=== 2022–2023 ===
Part of the 2016 ruling required the federal government to compensate those who had been harmed. As a result, the federal government signed a $20 billion compensation agreement, becoming the largest settlement in Canadian history. However, the Tribunal rejected it, citing concerns that not all claimants would be eligible for compensation.

In 2023, a federal judge approved a $23.34 billion compensation agreement and an additional $20 billion for reforms to on-reserve child welfare and family services to remove discrimination.

=== Present ===
The Caring Society has asked the Human Rights Tribunal to order the federal government to take various actions to address the pileup of Jordan's Principle requests. The Jordan's Principle Handbook states Canada must deliver a decision on individual requests for supports and services within 12 to 48 hours of receiving a completed request. The Caring Society found thousands of unopened email requests and claims the ISC has failed to provide timeframes for determination and payment. ISC's 24-hour phone line goes unanswered, with callers experiencing long callback delays.

== Campaigns ==
=== Spirit Bear ===
The Spirit Bear is a symbol of reconciliation in the movement for Indigenous child welfare equality. In 2008, Cindy Blackstock received a toy bear from the Carrier Sekani Tribal Council in British Columbia to accompany her to every Tribunal hearing to remind everyone that the case was about real children.

The Caring Society developed the Spirit Bear Plan, which outlines five calls to action alongside the government's full compliance with the Tribunal's rulings. Calls to action include:

1. Full compliance with all rulings made by the Tribunal and proper implementation of Jordan's Principle.
2. The Parliamentary Budget Officer is to publicly cost out the shortfalls in all federally funded public services provided to First Nations and propose solutions.
3. Government consultation with First Nations to co-create the Spirit Bear Plan and end all inequalities.
4. Publicly available independent evaluation of all government departments providing services to First Nations to identify discriminatory ideologies.
5. Mandatory training for all public servants to identify and address government ideology that fetters the implementation of the Truth and Reconciliation Commission's Calls to Action.

Spirit Bear has become personified with a social media account and has become the subject of various children's books written by Blackstock.

The Caring Society dedicated May 10th as Bear Witness Day, to honour Jordan River Anderson and commemorate the Canadian Human Rights Tribunal's ruling on the full implementation of Jordan's Principle. In 2026, the Senate announced it would adopt May 10th as National Bear Witness Day.

The Caring Society offers a Spirit Bear Award for a group of youth's commitment to reconciliation and the Truth and Reconciliation Commission's Calls to Action.

=== Have a Heart Day ===
Established in 2012 by the Caring Society, Have a Heart Day is an annual child and youth-led event held on February 14th. It focuses on reconciliation and equity for First Nations children to have the services and opportunities they need to grow up safely at home, get a good education, be healthy, and be proud of who they are.

The Caring Society holds an event in Ottawa to celebrate. Schools and organizations across Canada participate by sending letters to government leaders, learning about children's rights and reconciliation, and wearing orange or heart-themed clothing.

=== Shannen's Dream ===
The Caring Society launched Shannen's Dream, a campaign to honour the memory of Shannen Koostachin. They did so alongside Shannen's family, friends, and community.

Shannen was a young girl from Attawapiskat First Nation who fought for a new school in her community. With members of her community, she travelled to Parliament Hill to march in a procession in support of the rights of Indigenous peoples. Shannen spoke to the crowd about the government's failed promises and her dream of a safe and comfy school. In 2010, she died without ever seeing the new school.

Cindy Blackstock and six First Nations children travelled to the United Nations Committee on the Rights of the Child in Geneva, Switzerland. The children told the committee about their difficult school years in Attawapiskat and the violations of their rights.

In 2012, the Canadian House of Commons adopted a proposal to make 'Shannen's dream' a law guaranteeing First Nations children the right to a good education.

The Caring Society offers a Shannen's Dream Scholarship to assist First Nations youth with post-secondary education costs.

== Awards ==
Cindy Blackstock has been the recipient of multiple awards for her work and advocacy through the Caring Society.

Award	Year	Description
John Rook Leadership Award for Poverty Reduction	2025	Awarded to a Canadian who has demonstrated exemplary leadership in working to end poverty and embodies the principles of the Canadian Poverty Institute.
Royal Society of Canada Prize for Indigenous Engagement	2025	Awarded to First Nations, Inuit, and Metis in recognition of outstanding contributions to their respective field and toward advancing The Right to Participate as outlined in Article 18 of the United Nations Declaration on the Rights of Indigenous Peoples.
World's Children's Prize for the Rights of the Child	2023	Awarded to international organizations or individuals who have made outstanding contributions in the field of child rights.
Lynn Factor Stand Up for Kids National Award	2018	Celebrates and recognizes Canadians who are making a positive difference in the lives of children and youth involved with the child welfare system.
The Glenn Dover National Award for Outstanding Service	2010	Awarded to an individual social worker who is a member in good standing of a Canadian Association of Social Workers (CASW) Member Organization, honouring outstanding social work practice at the local, provincial, national, or international level.

== Structure ==
=== Leadership ===
The Caring Society is governed by a Board of Directors composed of representatives from First Nations child and family service agencies across Canada. The members are from Saskatchewan, Ontario, New Brunswick, Manitoba, Alberta, and British Columbia. The Caring Society's Executive Director is Cindy Blackstock.

=== Charitable status ===
The Caring Society is a registered charitable organization in Canada.

== Logo ==
The Caring Society's logo is called the "Cherished Child," created by Mintl-e-da-us, Wade Stephen Baker of Sky Spirit Studio in North Vancouver in 1999.

At the center of the emblem, a crow cradles an egg containing a healthy fetus, symbolizing that children are precious and must be protected. Several hands are encircling the egg, which reflects several messages:

- The role of the community in raising a child
- The first time First Nations' communities have come together to create a national organization
- The celebration of all races being equal partners in protecting Mother Earth and the child

The purple colouring represents healing, and soft blue represents serenity and calm. The black and white represent the negative and positive forces that shape the child and family.

== See also ==
- Truth and Reconciliation Commission of Canada
