= Carey–Fineman–Ziter syndrome =

Carey Fineman Ziter syndrome
- Autosomal recessive pattern is the inheritance manner of this condition
- Specialty: Medical genetics

Carey Fineman Ziter syndrome is a rare genetic condition. Fewer than 10 cases have been reported in the literature.

== Signs and symptoms ==
Several features have been described in this syndrome. These include:

- cleft palate
- micrognathia
- laryngostenosis
- developmental delay
- small pons
- scoliosis
- myopathy
- intermittent episodes of hypertension
- Poland sequence
- Möbius sequence
- hydronephrosis
- bilateral clubfeet (talipes)

== Genetics ==
Mutations in the gene Myomaker (MYMK) have been shown to be responsible for this condition. The gene is located on the long arm of chromosome 9 (9q34.2). Inheritance is autosomal recessive.

== Pathogenesis ==
The Myomaker gene encodes a transmembrane protein that is found on the surface of muscle cells. Mutations in this protein result in failure of myoblast fusion.

== Diagnosis ==
Diagnosis is made by sequencing the MYMK gene.

Previously diagnosis could be made on clinical features, though brain anomalies could only be determined with an MRI.

=== Differential diagnosis ===
- Native American myopathy
- Moebius syndrome

== Treatment ==
There is no curative treatment known. Management is supportive.

== History ==
The condition was first described in 1982.

Jordan River Anderson, born in 1999 in and died in 2005, was diagnosed with Carey Fineman Ziter syndrome and lived his entire life in hospital in Winnipeg, Manitoba, Canada. There were plans for him to live outside hospital with family but funding was subject to a jurisdictional dispute between the federal government of Canada and the provincial government of Manitoba because the federal government has financial responsibilities for health and education of Indigenous First Nations people in particular. Jordan became the namesake of Jordan's Principle in Canadian First Nations policy, stipulating that government-funded public services should be to First Nations children promptly and work out later which level of government will ultimately pay for any services whose funding is in dispute. Jordan River Anderson, the Messenger is a 2019 documentary film about Jordan and the campaign for and enactment of the principle.
