= Peter Bryce =

Canadian government physician (1853–1932)

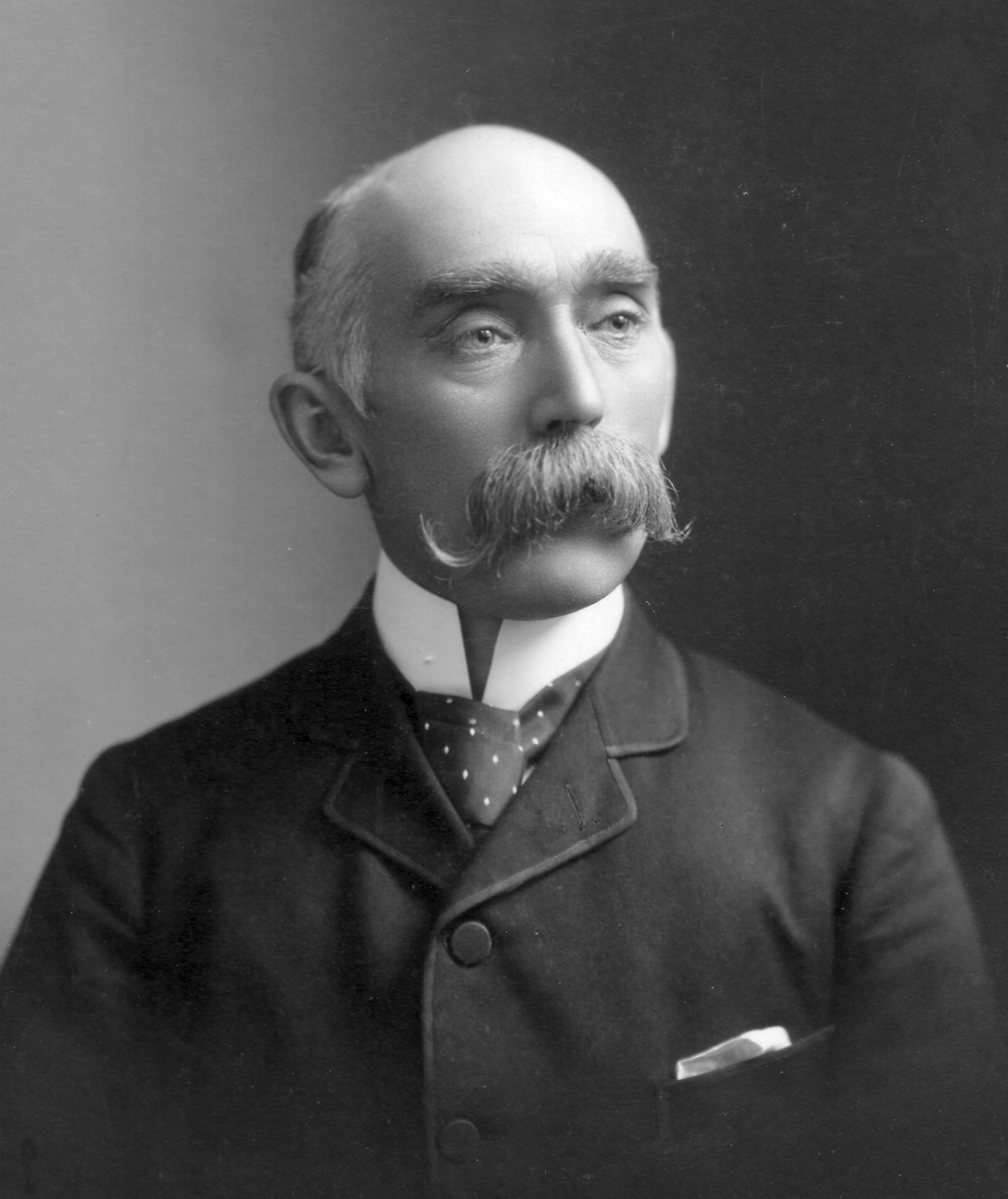
- Bryce in 1899
- Born: August 17, 1853; Mount Pleasant, Ontario
- Died: January 15, 1932 (aged 78); At sea near West Indies
- Resting place: Beechwood Cemetery
- Education: Upper Canada College; University of Toronto (BA 1876, MA 1877, MB 1880, MD 1886)
- Spouse: Kate Lynde Pardon (m. 1882)
- Children: 6
- Relatives: George Bryce (brother)
- Scientific career
- Fields: Public health

Peter Henderson Bryce (August 17, 1853 – January 15, 1932) was a public health physician for the Ontario provincial and Canadian federal governments. As a public official he submitted reports that highlighted the mistreatment of Indigenous students in the Canadian Indian residential school system and advocated for the improvement of environmental conditions at the schools. He also worked on the health of immigrant populations in Canada.

== Biography ==
Peter Bryce was born in Mount Pleasant, Ontario, on August 17, 1853. He obtained his medical degree from the University of Toronto, where he studied natural science geology, and went on to study neurology in Paris. He lectured in 1878-79 at the Ontario Agricultural College in Guelph, Ontario, in science and applied chemistry. Bryce served as the first secretary of the Ontario Board of Health from 1882 to 1904, and was also named as Ontario's first Chief Officer of Health in 1887 and Ontario Deputy Registrar General (in charge of Vital Statistics) in 1892. He was a member of the Canadian Association for the Prevention of Tuberculosis, and in 1900 became the first Canadian president of the American Public Health Association. Topics of his early papers included hypnotism, malaria, smallpox, diphtheria, sewage disposal, cholera, water supplies, ventilation, milk supply problems, tuberculosis, and the influence of forests on rainfall and health.

In 1904 Bryce was appointed the Chief Medical Officer of the federal Departments of the Interior and Indian Affairs. His 1905 and 1906 annual reports emphasized the abnormally high death rates for Indigenous peoples in Canada. In 1907 he wrote a "Report on the Indian Schools of Manitoba and the Northwest Territories" describing the health conditions of the Canadian residential school system in western Canada and British Columbia. This report was published without its recommendations, as Bryce discussed in his 1922 book The Story of a National Crime: Being a Record of the Health Conditions of the Indians of Canada from 1904 to 1921.

Bryce wrote that Indigenous children enrolled in residential schools were deprived of adequate medical attention and sanitary living conditions. He suggested improvements to national policies regarding the care and education of Indigenous peoples. In a 1907 report Bryce cited an average mortality rate of between 15% and 24% among the schools' children and 42% in Aboriginal homes, where sick children were sometimes sent to die. Bryce noted that the lack of certainty about the exact number of deaths was, in part, due to the official reports submitted by school principals and "defective way in which the returns had been made."

He appealed his forced retirement from the Civil Service in 1921 and was denied, subsequently publishing his suppressed report condemning the treatment of the Indigenous at the hands of the Department of Indian Affairs that had been given the responsibility under the British North America Act.

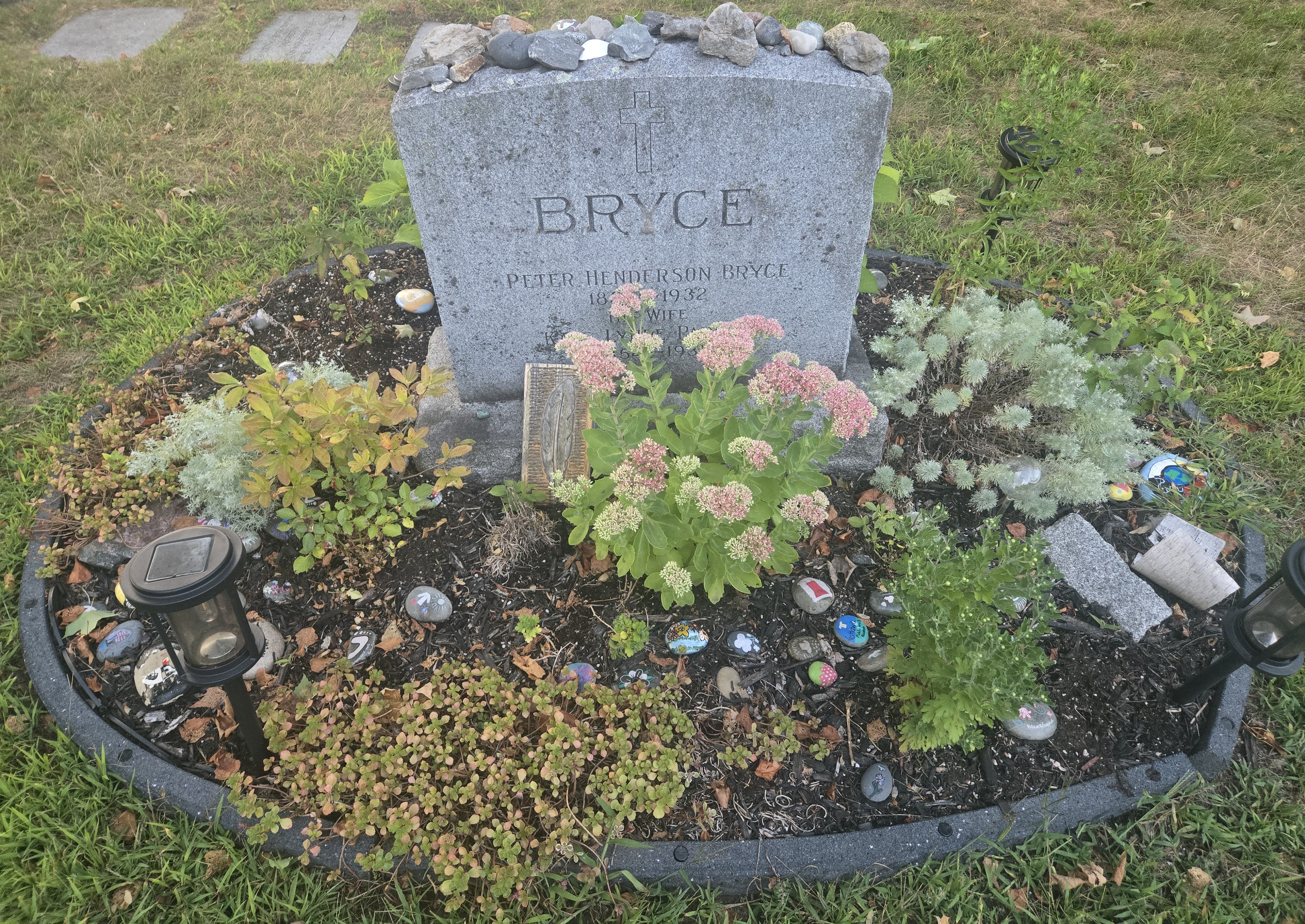
Bryce's grave site in Ottawa

Bryce died on January 15, 1932, while travelling in the West Indies. Dr. Bryce is buried and honoured at Beechwood Cemetery in Ottawa, the same location as Nicholas Flood Davin, author of the 1879 Davin Report that called for the establishment of a residential school system in Canada and Duncan Campbell Scott who served as deputy superintendent of the Department of Indian Affairs from 1913-1932.

== Legacy ==
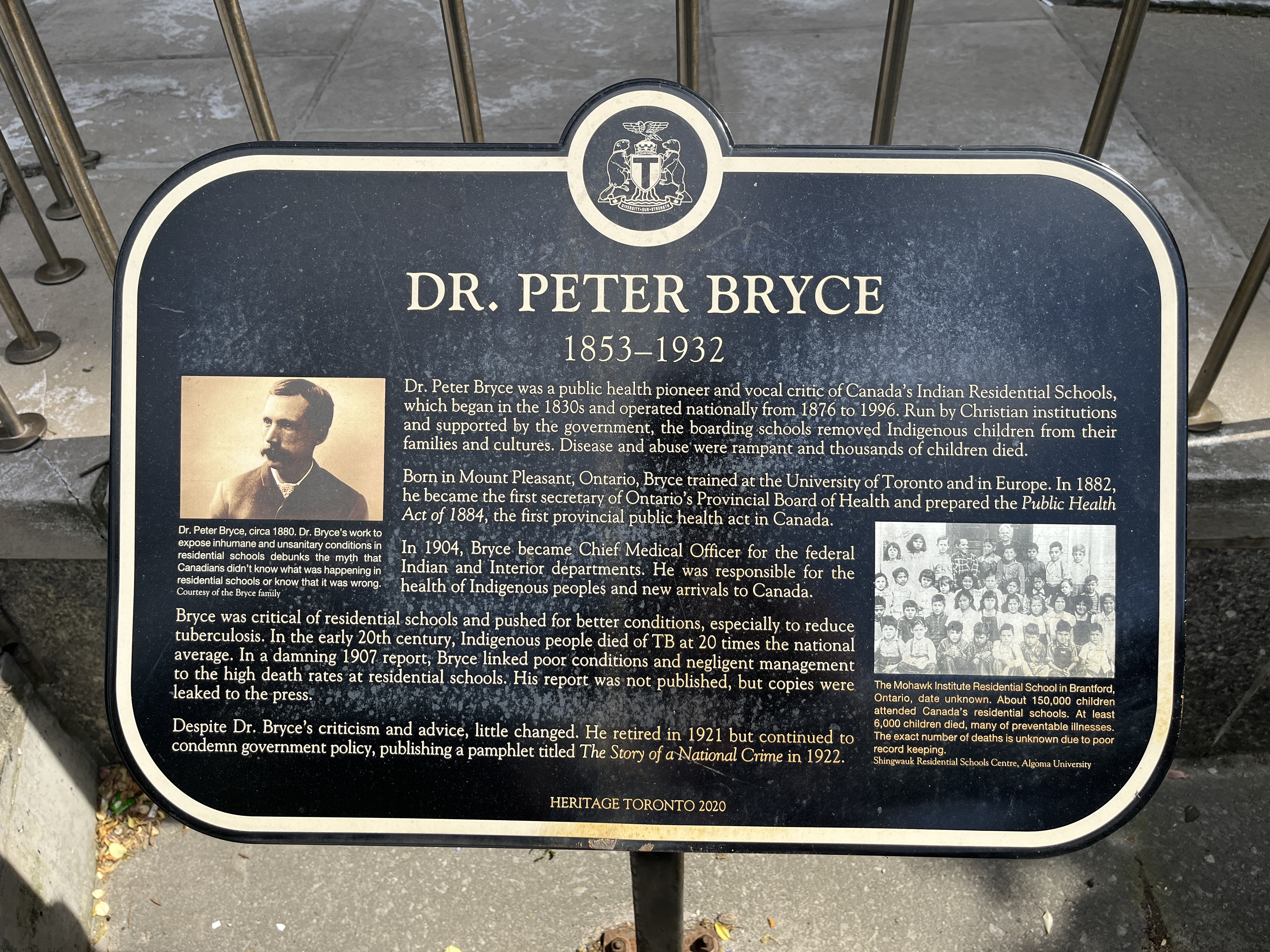
Heritage Toronto plaque for Dr Peter Bryce at the University of Toronto campus

To assist reconciliation while also addressing historical and societal injustices, Beechwood Cemetery has a Reconciling History program, where “school children of all backgrounds...place paper hearts of gratitude and remembrance at Dr. Bryce’s grave site, as they do their own part for reconciliation."

There are multiple plaques commemorating Bryce's efforts in improving public health and his outspoken views on residential schools. The first was erected in 2015 near Bryce's grave by the First Nations Child and Family Caring Society. Heritage Toronto would later erect a plaque in 2020 on the University of Toronto campus as part of its plaques program.

In 2024, Minister of Canadian Identity and Culture Steven Guilbeault announced that Dr Bryce would be classified as a person of national historic significance.

== Publications ==
- Bryce, P. H. (1885). "Small-Pox in Canada, and the Methods of Dealing with it in the Different Provinces". Public Health Papers and Reports. 11. American Public Health Association: 166–181. PMC 2266210. PMID 19600241.
- "The duty of the public in dealing with tuberculosis: being a paper read before the Association of Executive Health Officers of Ontario, at Ottawa, October 27th, 1898". 27 October 1898.
- "Annual Report of the Department of Indian Affairs, for the fiscal year ended 30th June, 1905". Department of Indian Affairs. 1906. pp. 271–278.
- "Annual Report of the Department of Indian Affairs, for the fiscal year ended 30th June, 1906". Department of Indian Affairs. 1907. pp. 272–284.
- "Report on the Indian schools of Manitoba and the Northwest Territories". Internet Archive. Ottawa : Government Printing Bureau, 1907. Retrieved 5 June 2021.
- "Insanity in immigrants: a paper read before the American Public Health Association, at Richmond, Va., October, 1909". Internet Archive. Ottawa: Government Printing Bureau, 1910. Retrieved 5 June 2021.
- "The illumination of Joseph Keeler, Esq., or, On, to the land!". Internet Archive. Boston, Mass.: The American Journal of Public Health, 1915. Retrieved 5 June 2021.
- "The story of a national crime: being an appeal for justice to the Indians of Canada; the wards of the nation, our allies in the Revolutionary War, our brothers-in-arms in the Great War – Record of the Health Conditions of the Indians of Canada from 1904 to 1921". Faded Page. Ottawa: James Hope and Sons. 1922.

== See also ==
- List of Canadian residential schools
- United States Indian Boarding School
- New Zealand Native schools
- Indian Residential Schools Truth and Reconciliation Commission
- Canada - Institutional racism
- The Story of a National Crime podcast at Knockabout Media.

== Sources ==
Hay, Travis; Blackstock, Cindy; Kirlew, Michael (2020-03-02). "Dr. Peter Bryce (1853–1932): whistleblower on residential schools". Canadian Medical Association Journal. 192 (9). CMA Joule Inc.: E223–E224. doi:10.1503/cmaj.190862. ISSN 0820-3946. PMC 7055949. PMID 32122982.

Lux, Maureen K. (1979–2016). ""BRYCE, PETER HENDERSON," in Dictionary of Canadian Biography, vol. 16, University of Toronto/Université Laval, 2003–". Dictionary of Canadian Biography (online ed.). University of Toronto Press.
