= Our People Will Be Healed =

2017 documentary film directed by Alanis Obomsawin

Our People Will Be Healed is a 2017 Canadian documentary film by Alanis Obomsawin. The film premiered at the 2017 Toronto International Film Festival. The film explores the Helen Betty Osborne Ininiw Education Resource Centre, an N-12 Frontier School Division school in Norway House, Manitoba where Cree students are taught about their own history and culture alongside the regular Manitoba school curriculum.

Obomsawin previously filmed at the school during the production of We Can't Make the Same Mistake Twice to document the story of Jordan River Anderson, a Cree child whose death became the basis of Jordan's Principle, a federal government commitment to funding services for Indigenous children. Impressed by the school's success in helping to develop strong, healthy children, she decided to tell its story in a standalone film. The title, Our People Will Be Healed is a quote from someone interviewed in the film, and Obomsawin has said she sees a new optimism for Canadian Indigenous people.

In December, TIFF named the film to its annual Canada's Top Ten list of the ten best Canadian films.

In 2021 the film was selected for inclusion in Celebrating Alanis, a retrospective program of Obomsawin's films at the 2021 Toronto International Film Festival.
