= Jean Folster =

Canadian community worker

- Folster, 1973
- Born: Jeanney York; 1922; Norway House, Manitoba, Canada
- Died: 26 December 1994 (aged 71–72); Norway House, Manitoba, Canada
- Occupations: Seamstress, Social worker, tribal leader, magistrate
- Years active: 1960s–1987
- Children: 8

Jean Folster (1922 – 26 December 1994) was a Canadian community worker and the first woman to become the chief of the Norway House Cree Nation. She was also the first Indigenous woman appointed as a magistrate in Manitoba. Born in 1922, she was the daughter of a trapper and was widowed at a young age. She sewed bridal attire to support her eight children. Aware of the financial challenges of being a widowed mother, she opened the first family services organisation in a First Nations community and became a social worker and welfare official for her band in the 1960s. She served as the vice president of the Manitoba Indian Women's Association from its founding in 1970.

Defeating three male candidates, in 1971 Forster became the first woman elected as a band chief in Manitoba. She was also the first chief to be paid, as her election to the post made her the replacement of the government's non-Native Indian agent. During her term, which spanned until 1975, she focused on child welfare, education, employment, health, and protection of the reserve lands. In 1972, she helped organise a conference in which for the first time Treaty and Non-Treaty Indians, met with local, state, tribal, and national leaders to create a development plan for the area. Native leaders at the conference stressed the need for them to have decision-making authority in their communities.

As a magistrate, Forster heard cases involving family matters, and liquor, traffic, and wildlife violations. She served for the northern Manitoba circuit court from 1973 to around 1987. She established one of the first domestic violence shelters in Manitoba in the 1970s, which now bears her name. In the 1980s she worked to develop a family counseling service to keep Native families together and prevent Indigenous children from being fostered off of their reserves. She was honoured with several awards during her lifetime, including recognition by the Canadian Speech Association and Manitoba Department of Education. Posthumously she was recognised as a trailblazer by the Nellie McClung Foundation in honour of the province's sesquicentennial and 105th anniversary of women's suffrage being won in Manitoba for the first time in a Canadian province.

== Early life and family ==
Jeanney York was born in 1922 at Norway House, Manitoba, Canada to Bella and James York. Her family were Treaty Indians and members of the Norway House Cree Nation. James, her father, was a trapper. York married Billy Folster in 1941, and they subsequently had eight children. Billy died in 1954, leaving Folster to support their children through sewing. She specialised in making bridal and attendants' gowns. Although her children also worked to support the family, for four years she received welfare. Despite financial challenges, in addition to raising her own children, Folster took in foster children.

== Career ==
Folster founded the first child and family services organisation in a First Nations community in the 1960s. She became the social welfare officer of the Norway House band in 1967, and was a social worker for the band. Her experience as a widowed mother with a precarious financial situation made her an empathetic counselor to the community. In 1970, the Manitoba Indian Women's Association was formed as an auxiliary to the Manitoba Indian Brotherhood. Folster was elected as vice president of the organisation. The immediate goals of the association were to provide employment training and family planning education to Indigenous women and to identify other issues which could help members to assist women and children.

Defeating three male candidates, Folster was elected chief of the Norway House Cree Nation in 1971. She was the first woman chief to be elected in Manitoba, and as the replacement of the government's non-Native Indian agent, she was the first tribal leader to be paid for her service. The immediate issues she wanted to address were protection of the reserve lands, alcoholism, child welfare, refurbishing the school, housing and employment. During her term in office, in 1974 Folster co-organised with Ken Albert, who would be elected chief of Norway House in 1976, and officials from tribal, provincial, and federal government offices, a conference which for the first time brought together Treaty and Non-Treaty Indians to formulate development plans for the area. Of primary importance was establishment of employment consultants to assist people living in rural communities and development of a service to match job candidates with available positions. Also under discussion were education, economic development, health and social services systems with an emphasis on increasing the Indigenous authority in decision-making for their communities. Her work to create understanding among people in Canada was recognised in 1974 by the Canadian Speech Association, which had given its inaugural award the previous year to former Prime Minister John Diefenbaker. She served as the tribal leader until 1975.

Folster was a founder of one of the first women's domestic violence shelters in the 1970s, which is now called the Jean Forster Place in her honour. In 1973, she was appointed as a magistrate for the province of Manitoba, becoming the first Indigenous woman who was a Treaty Indian to serve in the position. Her jurisdiction included communities in the northern circuit court, such as God's Lake, Island Lake, Norway House, Oxford House, and Poplar River. As magistrate, she heard cases of a non-serious nature, including family matters, liquor violations, traffic cases, and wildlife offences. She served until around 1987. In 1980, she was depicted on a poster which honoured Manitoba women who were involved in politics. The series was part of an on-going 20-year initiative of the Manitoba Department of Education which annually distributed posters about women's accomplishments to primary and secondary schools in Manitoba. Folster, Betsy Apetagon, and Myrtle Muskego, who all had experience in child care, established a federally funded project in 1981 to try to keep Native children on the reserve in their communities. Because it was difficult for parents to remain in contact with children taken off the reservation lands, the project was created to provide family counseling services to prevent neglect and emergency fostering homes on the reservation, if serious intervention was needed. The three-year initiative was funded through the Canadian Community Service Projects Programme.

== Death and legacy ==
Folster died on 26 December 1994, in Norway House. At the time of her death, she was remembered for the community initiatives she had begun to improve the lives of others. In 2020, the Nellie McClung Foundation decided to honour 150 women as part of the sesquicentennial anniversary of the establishment of Manitoba. They took public nominations and announced the winners of the Manitoba Women Trailblazer Awards on 28 January 2021, the 105th anniversary of women's suffrage being granted in the province, the first province in Canada to give women the vote. Folster was among the honourees chosen.
