= Incident at Restigouche =

Incident at Restigouche is a 1984 documentary film by Alanis Obomsawin, chronicling a series of two raids on the Listuguj Mi'gmaq First Nation (formerly known as Restigouche) by the Sûreté du Québec in 1981, as part of the efforts of the Quebec government to impose new restrictions on Native salmon fishermen.

== Production history ==
Obomsawin had heard about an impending police raid on the news and wanted to head to Restigouche immediately with a film crew. However, it took several weeks of discussions with her producer, the National Film Board of Canada (NFB), to secure permission. With approval finally granted, she arrived at the reserve with a small film crew shortly after a second raid. Obomsawin was irritated about what she had missed, forced to rely on footage from the Canadian Broadcasting Corporation and photographs from L'Aviron, a Campbellton newspaper. To add insult to injury, when Obomsawin asked the NFB for permission to shoot more interviews, including with then-Minister of Fisheries Lucien Lessard, who had ordered the raids, the Abenaki filmmaker was informed by NFB management that she should not interview white people for her film, only natives.

Obomsawin disregarded this order and interviewed Lessard anyway, in an exchange that would serve as a key part of the film. When confronted by NFB management about her disobedience, she told them that no one would tell her whom to interview and that while white people had interviewed Natives for years, the opposite had never been true. NFB management relented and Obomsawin was free to complete her film with relatively little interference—an important step forward for her in her increasing autonomy within the NFB.

== Interview with Lessard ==
In Obomsawin's pivotal exchange with Lessard, a member of the sovereigntist Parti Québécois, she confronts Lessard with the charge that a movement such as his that favours national self-determination for the Québécois was at the same time suppressing those rights for First Nations. In particular, she calls Lessard to task for a comment he made to the Listuguj chief, when he said "You cannot ask for sovereignty because to have sovereignty one must have one's own culture, language and land." By the end of the film, Lessard offers a personal apology for any harm his actions may have caused the people of Restigouche.

Obomsawin later said that she respected Lessard for his decision to speak directly and honestly with her, even if she strongly disagreed with his actions:

I invited him to Montreal for the interview and he knew I had a lot of problems with him. Many people told him not to come, that I would make mincemeat out of him. But he came, and I admired him for that. We fought all the time, but in the end I came to understand why people voted for him. He stood his ground, and if he made a promise to his constituents, you could be sure he would do his best to keep it.

== Music ==
In addition to documentary material and interviews, the film also includes a musical segment in which found film on the life cycle of salmon is accompanied by a song by Willie Dunn.

== Legacy ==
Mi'kmaq director Jeff Barnaby, who witnessed the 1981 raids first-hand, has stated that Incident at Restigouche was an inspirational film for him:

That documentary encapsulated the idea of films being a form of social protest for me, and that's something that didn't even dawn on me until I was much older. It started right there with that film.

Barnaby had all of the actors in his 2019 film Blood Quantum, about the effects of a zombie apocalypse on a Mi'kmaq reserve, watch Incident at Restigouche before commencing filming.

In 2021 the film was selected for inclusion in Celebrating Alanis, a retrospective program of Obomsawin's films at the 2021 Toronto International Film Festival.
