= Hi-Ho Mistahey! =

- Directed by: Alanis Obomsawin
- Production company: National Film Board of Canada
- Distributed by: National Film Board of Canada
- Release date: 7 September 2013 (TIFF)
- Running time: 99 min 43 s
- Country: Canada

Hi-Ho Mistahey! is a 2013 National Film Board of Canada feature documentary film by Alanis Obomsawin that profiles Shannen's Dream, an activist campaign first launched by Shannen Koostachin, a Cree teenager from Attawapiskat, to lobby for improved educational opportunities for First Nations youth.

The film premiered on 7 September 2013 at the 2013 Toronto International Film Festival. It was subsequently named first runner-up for the festival's People's Choice Award in the documentary category, behind Jehane Noujaim's The Square.

The film's title is Cree for "I love you forever." Obomsawin has said she heard about Koostachin's story from children's rights activist Cindy Blackstock. Obomsawin had been in the community of Attawapiskat working on this film when the Attawapiskat housing and infrastructure crisis broke. So she put this project aside and completed her film The People of the Kattawapiskak River, before completing Hi-Ho Mistahey!

The film was a shortlisted nominee for the Canadian Screen Award for Best Feature Length Documentary at the 2nd Canadian Screen Awards.
