= Sigwan =

2005 short film by Alanis Obomsawin

- Directed by: Alanis Obomsawin
- Written by: Alanis Obomsawin
- Produced by: Alanis Obomsawin
- Cinematography: Philippe Amiguet
- Edited by: Alison Burns
- Music by: Francis Grandmont
- Production company: National Film Board of Canada
- Release date: 2005
- Running time: 12 minutes
- Country: Canada
- Language: English

Sigwan is a Canadian short drama film directed by Alanis Obomsawin and released in 2005. One of just two narrative fiction films, alongside When All the Leaves Are Gone, that Obomsawin made in a career otherwise devoted entirely to documentary films, the film dramatizes the story of a young indigenous girl who is comforted and counselled by the wisdom of forest animals.

The cast includes Sylvi-Anne Siouï Trudel, Sigwanis Lachapelle, Guillaume Wawanolet, Sophy Wawanolet, Sébastien Gill, Pierre-Luc Grenier, Louis Msadoques, Steve Obomsawin, Fabrice Hannis Grandmont, Mylène Trudeau, Dawn Obomsawin, Kevin Cloutier, Charles Gariépy, Mathieu Obomsawin Gauthier, Alanis Obomsawin and Rodrigo Brinckhaus, with voiceovers by Sandra Laronde, Wiingushk-Kwe Teekens, Gary Farmer, Michelle St. John and Darrell Dennis.

The film was screened at the 2021 Toronto International Film Festival, as part of its special Celebrating Alanis retrospective of Obomsawin's films.
