= Bill Reid Remembers =

2022 Canadian short documentary film

- Directed by: Alanis Obomsawin
- Written by: Alanis Obomsawin
- Produced by: Alanis Obomsawin
- Starring: Bill Reid
- Edited by: Alison Burns
- Music by: Lauren Bélec; Michel Dubeau
- Production company: National Film Board of Canada
- Release date: April 30, 2022 (Hot Docs)
- Running time: 24 minutes
- Country: Canada
- Language: English

Bill Reid Remembers is a 2022 Canadian short documentary film, directed by Alanis Obomsawin. The film is a portrait of the life and career of influential Haida artist Bill Reid.

The film premiered at the 2022 Hot Docs Canadian International Documentary Festival. It was also screened at the DOXA Documentary Film Festival as part of Landscapes of Resistance, a program of films about indigenous resistance to colonialism.

The film was named to the Toronto International Film Festival's annual year-end Canada's Top Ten list for 2022. It received a Canadian Screen Award nomination for Best Short Documentary at the 11th Canadian Screen Awards in 2023.
