= Norway House Cree Nation =

First Nation in Manitoba, Canada

Coordinates: 54°01′20″N 97°45′05″W

- Band No. 278
- Kinosao Sipi ᑭᓄᓭᐏ ᓰᐱᐩ kinosêwi-sîpiy
- People: Cree
- Treaty: Treaty 5
- Headquarters: Norway House
- Province: Manitoba

Land
- Main reserve: Norway House 17

Population (October 2019)
- On reserve: 8389
- On other land: 68
- Off reserve: 1918
- Total population: 10375

Government
- Chief: Season Roulette
- Council: Alfred Laugher; Edward Albert; Tyler Duncan; Tim Folster; John Henry; Christina Mitchell

Website
- http://nhcn.ca

The Norway House Cree Nation (Kinosao Sipi) (Swampy Cree: ᑭᓄᓭᐏ ᓰᐱᐩ, romanized: kinosêwi-sîpiy) is based at Norway House, Manitoba, which is on the Playgreen Lake section of the Nelson River system. The people are Swampy Cree from the Rocky Cree (Asiniskaw Īthiniwak or Asinīskāwiyiniwak) band government. They are in possession of a number of reserves, but population is centered at IR Norway House 17 (06392). There are over 8300 members living on-reserve with another 1900 plus members at various locations off-reserve. The 2016 Census reported an official population of 7,927 inhabitants at Norway House 17 up from 7,758 in 2011.

The Norway House Cree Nation school is the subject of a documentary by Alanis Obomsawin.

== History ==
In 1816, Thomas Douglas sent Norwegians to build a road linking York Factory and Lake Winnipeg. In 1817, Norway House was built at Mossy Point, Manitoba. In 1821, Norway House became the principal inland fur trading depot for the Hudson's Bay Company. From then it became a convenient meeting place for the Council of the Northern Department of Rupert's Land. Later on in 1875, Treaty 5 was signed here.

Treaty 5 was created because the Cree people of Norway House were requesting to enter a treaty with the government of Canada as many other Indigenous peoples had been doing down south. They were struggling to survive, running low on food, housing supplies, and medicine. On September 24, 1875, Treaty 5 was signed at the Hudson's Bay outpost of Norway House, thereby creating the reserve of Norway House Cree Nation. A few families from Norway House Cree Nation then migrated down south to where is now Fisher River Cree Nation to establish an agricultural community. After signing Treaty 5, the government was then responsible for the education, public health, and food supplies for the community.

In 1900, the Norway House Residential School was built to accommodate the educational needs of First Nations students primarily from northern Manitoba. Children experienced poor sanitation standards and learned skills pertaining to labour, such as housekeeping, sewing, and mending. In the winter of 1906–1907, student Charles Clyne ran away from the school after receiving corporal punishment. His feet were badly frostbitten after spending a night in a cabin in the woods, and he was then permanently disabled. The school was poorly maintained, and burnt down in 1913. Another building was built in 1915, and was then destroyed by a fire in 1946. And again, another was erected in 1954 until it closed permanently in 1967.

== Notable people ==
- Jordan River Anderson, medical patient
- Ron Evans (politician), politician
- Jean Folster (1922–1994), first woman to serve as band chief
- Joe Keeper, Olympian
- Tina Keeper, actress
- David Robertson (writer), writer
