= Shannen's Dream =

Campaign for First Nations children's education

Shannen's Dream

Shannen's Dream is a Canadian youth-driven movement advocating for equitable education funding for First Nations children. Education on-reserve is funded by the Government of Canada, while off-reserve education is funded by provincial or territorial governments. Several reports by the Auditor General of Canada, the Parliamentary Budget Officer, and other authorities have indicated an urgent need for improved funding for on-reserve education. Shannen's Dream advocates for the building of safe and comfy schools on reserves, and culturally based education for all First Nations children and youth. The movement was named in honour of Shannen Koostachin, a young activist from the Attawapiskat First Nation and a nominee for the 2008 International Children's Peace Prize

The campaign is the subject of Alanis Obomsawin's 2013 documentary film Hi-Ho Mistahey!.

== Shannen Koostachin ==
Shannen Noella Jane Koostachin was born on July 12, 1994 in Attawapiskat First Nation on the James Bay coast of Ontario to Andrew Koostachin and Jenny Nakogee. She attended J. R. Nakogee Elementary School, which had been housed in makeshift portables since 2000, when it had been condemned and closed due to a decades-old fuel leak. Shannen then realized that the government was not giving proper funding to First Nations Aboriginal schooling systems around Canada, and that's when her dream/movement came to be. By 2007, the federal government had backed away from a third commitment to building a new school for Attawapiskat. In response, Koostachin and others turned to YouTube and Facebook to launch the Students Helping Students campaign for a school for Attawapiskat. Koostachin spoke out about the experiences of her community in newspapers, at conferences, and on the steps of Parliament Hill in 2008. In 2009, at the age of 14, she was nominated for the International Children’s Peace Prize.

Koostachin and her older sister, Serena, moved hundreds of kilometres away from Attawapiskat to New Liskeard, Ontario, for high school. On June 1, 2010, Shannen died as a result of a car accident.

In 2014, DC Comics developed Equinox, a new superhero character inspired by Shannen. Equinox, a sixteen year old First Nations superhero, appeared in a five-issue story in the Justice League Canada comic book series.

A monument to Shannen Koostachin, with a statue depicting her dressed in regalia, was unveiled in New Liskeard in 2015. In 2017, Shannen was named one of 150 greatest Canadians. The list—which also includes names like Terry Fox and Emily Carr—was created to help celebrate Canada's 150th birthday.

== Shannen's Dream campaign ==
After Koostachin's death, those who had participated in the Students Helping Students campaign wanted to continue her fight. Shannen's Dream was formed, and is one of many social justice campaigns carried out by the First Nations Child and Family Caring Society. Shannen's Dream is a student- and youth-focused campaign designed to raise awareness about inequitable funding for First Nations children. It encourages supporters to write letters to their Member of Parliament, the Minister of Aboriginal Affairs and Northern Development Canada, and the Prime Minister of Canada. To accompany this movement, Timmins-James Bay MP Charlie Angus reintroduced Shannen's Dream as Motion 201 to the House of Commons of Canada on September 26, 2011. On February 27, 2012, the House of Commons unanimously voted in favour of the motion.

On June 22, 2012, the day that Shannen would have graduated, construction started on a new school in Attawapiskat, the Kattawapiskak Elementary School. It opened on September 8, 2014.
