= Honour to Senator Murray Sinclair =

2021 Canadian short documentary film

- Directed by: Alanis Obomsawin
- Written by: Alanis Obomsawin
- Produced by: Alanis Obomsawin
- Starring: Murray Sinclair
- Cinematography: German Gutierrez
- Edited by: Alison Burns
- Music by: Lauren Bélec; Michel Dubeau
- Production company: National Film Board of Canada
- Release date: September 2021 (TIFF)
- Running time: 29 minutes
- Country: Canada
- Language: English

Honour to Senator Murray Sinclair is a Canadian short documentary film, directed by Alanis Obomsawin and released in 2021. The film intercuts excerpts of former Canadian senator Murray Sinclair's 2016 acceptance speech, when he was presented with an award by the World Federalist Movement-Canada in honour of his role as chair of the Truth and Reconciliation Commission of Canada, with the personal testimonies of various survivors of the Canadian Indian residential school system.

The film premiered at the 2021 Toronto International Film Festival, as part of its special Celebrating Alanis retrospective of Obomsawin's films.

The film was named to TIFF's annual year-end Canada's Top Ten list for 2021.
