= When All the Leaves Are Gone =

2010 Canadian short film

- Directed by: Alanis Obomsawin
- Written by: Alanis Obomsawin
- Produced by: Alanis Obomsawin
- Starring: Rosalie Dumas; Daphnée Vincent; Justine Rolland; Marie-Josée Corneau; Margie Hoff
- Cinematography: Philippe Amiguet
- Edited by: Alison Burns
- Music by: Luc-Dominique Tremblay; Normand Guilbeault
- Production company: National Film Board of Canada
- Release date: 2010
- Running time: 17 minutes
- Country: Canada
- Languages: English; French; Wabanaki; Atikamekw; Innu; Inuktitut

When All the Leaves Are Gone is a Canadian short drama film, directed by Alanis Obomsawin and released in 2010. One of just two narrative fiction films, alongside Sigwan, that Obomsawin made in a career otherwise devoted entirely to documentary films, the film dramatizes Obomsawin's childhood experiences through the story of Wato (Rosalie Dumas), a young girl experiencing anti-indigenous prejudice as the only First Nations student in an otherwise all-white school in the 1940s, who finds comfort and strength in the magical world of her dreams.

The cast also includes Daphnée Vincent, Justine Rolland, Marie-Josée Corneau, Margie Hoff, Yves Nolin Allaire and Jean-Claude Cloutier, with voice dubbing in the English version performed by Lynne Adams, Katie Patewabano, Jennifer Seguin and Jennifer Suleteanu.

The film was also released in Wabanaki, Atikamekw, Innu and Inuktitut language versions.

The film was screened at the 2021 Toronto International Film Festival, as part of its special Celebrating Alanis retrospective of Obomsawin's films.
