= The People of the Kattawapiskak River =

- Directed by: Alanis Obomsawin
- Distributed by: National Film Board of Canada
- Release date: 2012
- Country: Canada

The People of the Kattawapiskak River is a 2012 documentary film by Alanis Obomsawin exploring conditions inside the Attawapiskat First Nation, which in October 2011 declared a state of emergency due to health and safety concerns over a lack of housing and infrastructure, and remained in the public spotlight during the Idle No More protests.

Obomsawin was present in the community in 2011, working on another film for the National Film Board of Canada, Hi-Ho Mistahey!, when the housing issue came to national attention. The film follows the crisis up to the Federal Court of Canada decision in August 2012 that ruled the appointment of a third-party manager to fix the housing crisis was unjustified. In addition to filming conditions in the community and interviewing residents, Obomsawin recounts the history of the village, which dates back to 1850 when Catholic missionaries built a chapel on the land.

Obomsawin has stated that she uses the name "Kattawapiskak" in place of Attawapiskat in the film and its title because she believes it to be the community's correct name.

== Release ==
Obomsawin screens her films first in the local community, a practice that she continued with The People of the Kattawapiskak River.

The film's official premiere took place on the opening night of the 13th imagineNATIVE Film + Media Arts Festival in Toronto, with Obomsawin, Chief Theresa Spence, Member of Parliament Charlie Angus, and Attawapiskat community members in attendance.

It subsequently screened on November 11, 2012, as part of the Rencontres internationales du documentaire de Montréal. From January 11 to 18, 2013, the National Film Board streamed the film for free on its NFB.ca website.

On March 4, 2014, the film received the Donald Brittain Award for best social/political documentary program at the 2nd Canadian Screen Awards.
