= Gene Boy Came Home =

- Directed by: Alanis Obomsawin
- Written by: Alanis Obomsawin
- Produced by: Alanis Obomsawin
- Cinematography: Philippe Amiguet
- Edited by: Alison Burns
- Music by: Francis Grandmont
- Production company: National Film Board of Canada
- Distributed by: National Film Board of Canada
- Release date: 2007
- Running time: 25 minutes
- Country: Canada
- Language: English

Gene Boy Came Home is a 2007 documentary film by First Nations filmmaker Alanis Obomsawin, produced by the National Film Board of Canada.

The film tells the story of Eugene "Gene Boy" Benedict, who is a First Nations person raised on the Odanak Indian Reserve, approximately an hour and a half east of Montreal. He left home at age 15 to work in construction in New York City. At 17, adrift and beginning to lose his way, he accepted a dare and enlisted in the United States Marine Corps. A few months later, he was on his way to the frontlines of the Vietnam War.

The film recounts Benedict's childhood, when he was taken from his family sent to school in Ontario. In his teens, he left his reserve to in then high steel construction in the United States. On a dare from his step-father, he enlisted in the U.S. military and went through boot camp at Parris Island. The film combines his recollections of experiences there with scenes of a contemporary boot camp, to show how little has changed in the way young men are broken down and remade as soldiers.

Benedict was assigned as a sniper and scout at Da Nang. During his time in Vietnam, he saw friends killed and maimed, and found himself fighting Vietcong as young as six years old. Benedict was also sprayed with Agent Orange, though he and his fellow soldiers were never warned of its hazards. After his military tour was over, he returned home only to find that, like many Vietnam vets, he was "spat upon" and "treated like the enemy." He learned to hide the fact that he served in Vietnam, and felt abandoned by the government. Afflicted with post-traumatic stress, he would experience flashbacks and bad dreams for the rest of his life.

Looking for some relief from his trauma, he decided to return to his home reserve in Odanak. Though he continued to need medication, he was able to gain some measure of peace, driving the community's school bus and helping young people. Benedict died shortly after the film's final scene was shot, at the age of 59.
