= Alanis Obomsawin =

American-Canadian Abenaki artist and filmmaker

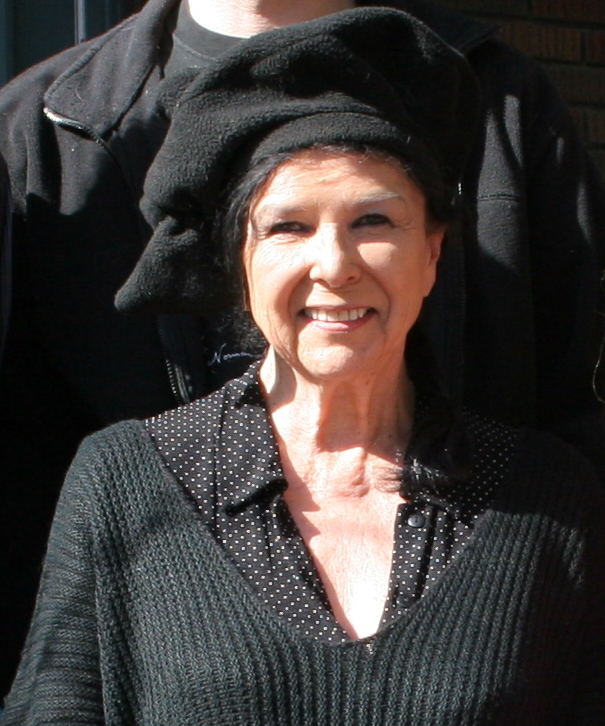
- Obomsawin after recording Waseteg in 2010
- Born: August 31, 1932 (age 94) near Lebanon, New Hampshire, U.S.
- Occupations: Film director; musician (1973–1976); film producer; documentary filmmaker; printmaker; documentarian; film screenwriter; singer; creative director; activist; artist
- Employer: National Film Board of Canada
- Notable work: Bush Lady
- Awards: Companion of the Order of Canada; Governor General's Awards in Visual and Media Arts; Governor General's Performing Arts Award; Member of the Order of Canada; Order of Montreal; Prix Albert-Tessier; Grand Officer of the National Order of Quebec; Edward MacDowell Medal

Alanis Obomsawin, CC GOQ (born August 31, 1932) is an Abenaki American-Canadian filmmaker, singer, artist, and activist primarily known for her documentary films. Born in New Hampshire, United States, and raised primarily in Quebec, Canada, she has written and directed many National Film Board of Canada documentaries on First Nations issues. Obomsawin is a member of Film Fatales group of independent women filmmakers. Her best known documentary is Kanehsatake: 270 Years of Resistance, regarding the 1990 Oka Crisis in Quebec.

== Life ==
Obomsawin, which means "pathfinder", was born on August 31, 1932, near Lebanon, New Hampshire. When she was six months old, her family returned to the Odanak reserve located near Sorel, Quebec, where she lived until she was nine years old. Her mother ran a boarding house and her father was a medicine maker and a guide. During this period they lived with her maternal aunt Jesse Benedict, her husband Levi Benedict, and their own six children. Théophile Panadis, her mother's cousin, initiated Obomsawin into the history of the Abenaki Nation and taught her many songs and legends.

When she was nine years old, Obomsawin and her parents left Odanak for Trois-Rivières, where they were the only Indigenous family. At that time speaking Obomsawin spoke little French and no English. Her father died of tuberculosis when she was twelve.

At 22 she left the reserve. During a two-year stay in Florida she also learned English. In the late 1950s she moved back to Montreal and began performing as a singer and a storyteller, making appearances on reservations, in prisons and schools, and at music festivals.

Her daughter, Kisos Obomsawin, was born in 1969.

== Career ==
=== Singer-songwriter ===
In 1960, she debuted as a singer during a concert at The Town Hall in New York City. As a performer Obomsawin has toured Canada, the United States, and Europe performing for humanitarian causes in universities, museums, prisons, art centres, and folk art festivals.

She managed her own stage at the Mariposa Folk Festival in the 1960s. Her 1988 album Bush Lady featured traditional songs of the Abenaki people, as well as original compositions. Originally released on her own private press, it was remastered and re-released in 2018 by Constellation Records.

=== Filmmaker ===
As of 2025, Obomsawin has directed 65 films with the NFB. Obomsawin's filmmaking came to the attention of the National Film Board of Canada in the mid-1960s, when she held fundraising concerts to pay for the construction of a swimming pool in Odanak. Children in her community were no longer able to swim in the Saint Francis River, but were not allowed to use a pool in a neighboring community which was for white residents only. Obomsawin was interviewed about her film about the issue in a report for CBC-TV's Telescope series, which was seen by NFB producers Joe Koenig and Bob Verrall. They invited her to work as an advisor on a film about First Nations people.

Obomsawin directed her first documentary for the NFB, Christmas at Moose Factory, in 1971. Obomsawin's next films included: Incident at Restigouche (1984), a depiction of the Sûreté du Québec police raid of a Listuguj Mi'gmaq First Nation reserve; Richard Cardinal: Cry from a Diary of a Métis Child (1986), an examination of an adolescent suicide; No Address (1988), a look at Montreal's homeless population; and Mother of Many Children (1977), her first feature-length documentary.

She made a series of films about the 1990 Oka crisis. The first, Kanehsatake: 270 Years of Resistance (1993), is a feature-length film documenting the 1990 Kanien'kehá:ka uprising in Kanehsatà:ke and Oka. It was followed by My Name is Kahentiiosta (1995), a film about a young Kahnawake woman who was arrested after the 78-day armed standoff, and Spudwrench – Kahnawake Man (1997), profiling Randy Horne, a high-steel worker from Kahnawake. The 2000 NFB release Rocks at Whiskey Trench was Obomsawin's fourth film in her series about the Oka crisis.

The Esgenoôpetitj First Nation in New Brunswick was the subject of her 2002 documentary, Is the Crown at War With Us?, exploring a conflict with the Department of Fisheries and non-Indigenous fishers over fishing rights. Her 2003 NFB documentary Our Nationhood chronicles the Listuguj Mi'gmaq First Nation's efforts to use and manage the natural resources of their traditional lands.

In 2005, Obomsawin completed her short drama Sigwan, following a young girl who is aided by the animals of the forest. In 2006, she completed WABAN-AKI: People from Where the Sun Rises, a look at the people and stories from her home reserve of Odanak.

Her credits also include Gene Boy Came Home (2007), about First Nations Vietnam War veteran Eugene Benedict.

In 2009, she completed the documentary Professor Norman Cornett: "Since when do we divorce the right answer from an honest answer?", looking at the dismissal of McGill University religious studies lecturer Norman Cornett, which had its world premiere at the Hot Docs film festival.

In 2010, Obomsawin completed the short drama When All the Leaves Are Gone, about her experiences attending public school in Quebec.

Her 2012 documentary The People of the Kattawapiskak River on the Attawapiskat housing-crisis was conceived when Obomsawin was present in the community in 2011, working on another film for the NFB.

Obomsawin's 2013 documentary Hi-Ho Mistahey! about Shannen Koostachin, a First Nations education activist, premiered at the 2013 Toronto International Film Festival.

Obomsawin's 2014 documentary Trick or Treaty? was the first film by an Indigenous filmmaker to screen in the Masters program at the Toronto International Film Festival. Obomsawin began conceptualizing the film in 2010 when she was invited by Stan Louttit, Grand Chief of the Mushkegowuk Council, to film a conference the band was hosting regarding Treaty 9.

Her 2016 documentary We Can't Make the Same Mistake Twice explored a human rights complaint filed against the Canadian government over discrimination against First Nations children. It had its world premiere on September 13 at the 2016 Toronto International Film Festival.

Her documentary film Our People Will Be Healed, about the Helen Betty Osborne Ininiw Education Resource Centre in Norway House Cree Nation, premiered in the Masters program of the 2017 Toronto International Film Festival.

Obomsawin has also taught at the Summer Institute of Film and Television in Ottawa.

Obomsawin has served on the jury at numerous Canadian film festivals throughout her career, including the Toronto International Film Festival, Hot Docs, the imagineNATIVE Film and Media Arts Festival, and the Regina International Film Festival.

=== Engraver and printmaker ===
For more than 25 years, Obomsawin has worked as an engraver and printmaker, with exhibitions in Canada and Europe. Mother and child imagery is prominent in her work, which also combines material from her own dreams with animal spirits and historical events. Her work was exhibited at the Maison Lacombe in Quebec in 2007.

== Recognition ==
=== Awards and honours ===
In March 2001, Obomsawin received a Governor General's Award in Visual and Media Arts.

In 2006 Obomsawin won the award for the Best Documentary Award from the imagineNATIVE Film and Media Arts Festival for Waban-aki: People from Where the Sun Rises.

A retrospective of her work was held from May 14 to 26 of 2008 at the Museum of Modern Art in New York City. That same month, she received the Governor General's Performing Arts Award for Lifetime Artistic Achievement.

In the spring of 2009, Obomsawin was honoured with a special retrospective at Hot Docs and received the festival's Hot Docs Outstanding Achievement Award.

In 2010, she was named to the Playback Canadian Film & Television Hall of Fame.

Obomsawin was named an Honorary Fellow of the Royal Society of Canada for 2013. In January of that year, the Academy of Canadian Cinema & Television announced that Obomsawin would receive its Humanitarian Award for Exceptional Contributions to Community & Public Service, presented at the 2nd Canadian Screen Awards. At the 2013 Toronto International Film Festival, she was a recipient of a Birks Diamond Tribute to the Year's Women in Film.

In October 2015, she received a lifetime achievement award from Chile's Valdivia International Film Festival. In February 2015, the Montreal-based peace advocacy arts group Artistes pour la paix presented her with its lifetime achievement award. In March of that year, she was among the first 35 people named to the inaugural Ordre des arts et des lettres du Québec.

In November 2016, she received the Clyde Gilmour Award from the Toronto Film Critics Association, which called Obomsawin "a significant architect of Canadian cinema and culture." Also in 2016, she received the Prix Albert-Tessier for contributions to the cinema of Quebec in November and was named a Grand Officer of the National Order of Quebec in June.

In March 2017, she received the inaugural Prix Origine at Montreal's Bâtisseuses de la Cité Awards for her work on Indigenous issues. In 2018, she was named a Commander of the Order of Montreal.

In June 2019 she was named a Companion of the Order of Canada after previously having been named Officer in 2002. At the 2019 Vancouver International Film Festival, Obomsawin received the Best Canadian Documentary Award for Jordan River Anderson, the Messenger.

In October 2020 she was named the thirteenth laureate of the Glenn Gould Prize. Also in 2020 she received the Iris Tribute lifetime honour at the 22nd Quebec Cinema Awards from Québec Cinéma's Comité de représentation professionnelle.

Obomsawin's honours also include the Luminaria Tribute for Lifetime Achievement from the Santa Fe Film Festival, the International Documentary Association's Pioneer Award, the Toronto Women in Film and Television's Outstanding Achievement Award in Direction, the Canadian Native Arts Foundation National Aboriginal Achievement Award in Arts, and the Outstanding Contribution Award from the Canadian Sociology and Anthropology Association.

At the 2021 Toronto International Film Festival, a special retrospective program of Obomsawsin's films was presented. Obomsawin was named as that year's recipient of TIFF's Jeff Skoll Award in Impact Media.

In 2023, Obomsawin was the recipient of the 63rd Edward MacDowell Medal, becoming the first awardee from the Indigenous land on which the residency program is located.

=== Appointments ===
Obomsawin has chaired the board of directors of the Native Women's Shelter of Montreal and sat on the Canada Council's First People's Advisory Board. She was a board member of Studio One, the NFB's Indigenous-led studio, and a former advisor to the New Initiatives in Film, a Studio D program for women of color and First Nations women. As a member of the board of Aboriginal Voices Radio Network, Obomsawin was part of an initiative to obtain a radio licence for the organization. A lifetime member of the board of directors for the Aboriginal Peoples Television Network, Obomsawin is also a member of the board for Vermont Public Television and National Geographic International.

=== Degrees ===
Obomsawin has received an Honorary Doctor of Letters from York University (1994), an Honorary Doctor of Laws from Concordia University (1993), an Honorary Doctor of Literature from Carleton University (1994), an Honorary Doctor of Laws from the University of Western Ontario (2007), an Honorary Doctor of Letters from the University of British Columbia (2010), an Honorary Doctor of Arts from Dartmouth College (2013), an Honorary Doctor of Laws from Dalhousie University (2016), an honorary doctorate from McGill University's School of Continuing Studies (2017), and an Honorary Doctor of Laws from Ryerson University (2018).

=== Awards named in honour ===
Cinema Politica created the Alanis Obomsawin Award for Commitment to Community and Resistance in 2011.

The ImagineNATIVE Film and Media Arts Festival presents the Documentary Feature Award in honour of Alanis Obomsawin every year.

Festival Regard's Regards Autochtones Prize was renamed the Alanis Obomsawin Prize in her honour in 2025.

=== Exhibitions ===
From February to April 2022, the Haus der Kulturen der Welt dedicated the exhibition The Children Have to Hear Another Story – Alanis Obomsawin to her. The catalogue Alanis Obomsawin: Lifework was produced on the occasion of the exhibition. From April to August 2023, the Vancouver Art Gallery held the same exhibition.

== Filmography ==
- 1971 – Christmas at Moose Factory
- 1972 – The Canoe
- 1972 – Children
- 1972 – History of Manawan, Part One
- 1972 – History of Manawan, Part Two
- 1972 – Moose Call
- 1972 – Partridge
- 1972 – Snowshoes
- 1975 – Basket (Lhk'wál'us)
- 1975 – Farming (Lep'cál)
- 1975 – Mount Currie Summer Camp
- 1975 – Puberty, Part One
- 1975 – Puberty, Part Two
- 1975 – Salmon (Tsúqwaoz')
- 1975 – Xusum
- 1977 – Mother of Many Children
- 1977 – Amisk
- 1979 – Gabriel Goes to the City
- 1979 – Wild Rice Harvest Kenora
- 1980 – June in Povungnituk
- 1984 – Incident at Restigouche
- 1986 – Richard Cardinal: Cry from a Diary of a Métis Child
- 1987 – Poundmaker's Lodge: A Healing Place
- 1988 – No Address
- 1991 – Le patro Le Prévost – 80 Years Later
- 1992 – Walker
- 1993 – Kanehsatake: 270 Years of Resistance
- 1995 – My Name is Kahentiiosta
- 1997 – Spudwrench – Kahnawake Man
- 2000 – Rocks at Whiskey Trench
- 2002 – Is the Crown at War With Us?
- 2003 – Our Nationhood
- 2005 – Sigwan
- 2006 – Waban-Aki: People from Where the Sun Rises
- 2007 – Gene Boy Came Home
- 2009 – Professor Norman Cornett: "Since when do we divorce the right answer from an honest answer?"
- 2010 – When All the Leaves Are Gone
- 2012 – The People of the Kattawapiskak River
- 2012 – The Federal Court Hearing
- 2013 – Hi-Ho Mistahey!
- 2014 – Trick or Treaty?
- 2016 – We Can't Make the Same Mistake Twice
- 2017 – Our People Will Be Healed
- 2019 – Jordan River Anderson, the Messenger
- 2021 – Honour to Senator Murray Sinclair
- 2022 – Bill Reid Remembers
- 2025 – My Friend the Green Horse
