= Christopher Auchter =

Haida artist and filmmaker from Canada

Christopher Auchter is a Haida artist and filmmaker from Canada. He is most noted for his 2019 short film Now Is the Time, which was a Canadian Screen Award nominee for Best Short Documentary at the 8th Canadian Screen Awards in 2020.

== Background ==
A native of Haida Gwaii, he studied media arts at Emily Carr University of Art and Design and computer animation at Sheridan College. He has also illustrated several books by children's writer Jordan Wheeler.

== Career ==
He worked on the animation teams for the 2009 short film How People Got Fire, the 2009 video game Punch-Out!! and the 2017 television series Coyote's Crazy Smart Science Show, before releasing his own animated short film debut, The Mountain of SGaana, in 2017. Although told without dialogue, the film features music sung in the Haida language by his sister Nikita Auchter.

Now Is the Time premiered at the 2019 Toronto International Film Festival. Created to mark the 50th anniversary of Haida artist Robert Davidson carving and erecting a totem pole on Haida Gwaii in 1969, the film blends historical footage from Eugene Boyko's 1970 documentary film This Was the Time with contemporary footage, including the now elderly Davidson's own reflections on the historic importance of his project.

He subsequently directed several episodes of the animated Netflix series Not Quite Narwhal.

His feature documentary film debut, The Stand, premiered at the 2024 Vancouver International Film Festival, where it received an honorable mention from the Best British Columbia Film award jury.

== Filmography ==
- The Mountain of SGaana (2017)
- Now Is the Time (2019)
- Ryan Reynolds: I'm a Laureate? (2020)
- The Stand (2024)
