= This Was the Time =

- Directed by: Eugene Boyko
- Written by: Jacques Bensimon
- Produced by: Eugene Boyko; Bill Brind
- Starring: Robert Davidson
- Cinematography: Eugene Boyko
- Edited by: Jacques Bensimon
- Production company: National Film Board of Canada
- Release date: 1970
- Running time: 16 minutes
- Country: Canada
- Language: English

This Was the Time is a Canadian documentary film, directed by Eugene Boyko and released in 1970. Created for the National Film Board of Canada, the film portrays the renaissance of Haida culture through its depiction of a potlatch ceremony in Haida Gwaii, culminating in artist Robert Davidson carving and erecting a totem pole in the community for the first time in nearly a century.

In the 21st century, the NFB launched a project to counter the sometimes colonialist outsider perspectives reflected in many of its old documentaries on First Nations and Inuit cultures by commissioning indigenous filmmakers to make their own new films responding to and recontextualizing the older films. Christopher Auchter's Now Is the Time, a response to This Was the Time which mixed footage from the original film with contemporary footage including Davidson's own reflections on the project, was released in 2019.
