= Rocks at Whiskey Trench =

- French: Pluie de pierres à Whiskey Trench
- Directed by: Alanis Obomsawin
- Written by: Alanis Obomsawin
- Produced by: Alanis Obomsawin; Sally Bochner
- Narrated by: Alanis Obomsawin
- Cinematography: Philippe Amiguet; René Siouï Labelle; Roger Rochat
- Edited by: Yurij Luhovy
- Music by: Francis Grandmont; Claude Vendette
- Production company: National Film Board of Canada
- Release date: 2000
- Running time: 105 minutes
- Country: Canada
- Languages: English; French

Rocks at Whiskey Trench (French: Pluie de pierres à Whiskey Trench) is a Canadian documentary film, directed by Alanis Obomsawin and released in 2000. The film centres on the Honoré Mercier Bridge blockade of 1990 during the Oka Crisis, focusing in particular on the incident when a group of Mohawk women and children from Kahnawake, in the process of being evacuated from the community due to fears of a Canadian Forces occupation, were violently pelted with rocks as they crossed into Montreal.

A National Film Board of Canada production, it was released in both English and French versions. The film received a Genie Award nomination for Best Feature Length Documentary at the 21st Genie Awards.
