= How People Got Fire =

- Directed by: Daniel Janke
- Written by: Daniel Janke
- Produced by: Svend-Erik Eriksen, Martin Rose
- Narrated by: Louise Profeit-Leblanc
- Cinematography: Brian Johnson
- Edited by: Andrew Connors
- Music by: Daniel Janke
- Animation by: Christopher Auchter; Stuart Andrew Sharp; Jay White
- Distributed by: National Film Board of Canada
- Release date: 2008
- Running time: 16 minutes
- Country: Canada
- Languages: English; French

How People Got Fire is a short animated film from the Yukon territory of Canada.

== Synopsis ==
In a snowy village, a young girl listens to her grandmother's fable of how the crow brought fire to the people. The film explores aboriginal American spirituality, oral story-telling and childhood in climates in the extreem north.

== Details ==
=== Production ===
This short film is based in part on the story told by the late Kitty Smith of the Kwanlin Dun First Nation. It was shot in Carcross-Tagish, Yukon and rotoscoped, with the addition of charcoal drawings by Christopher Auchter, and a contemporary classical sound track by Daniel Janke.

=== Reception ===
The film was the 2009 World Indigenous Film Awards Winner for Best Animation, and received the 2009 American Indian Film Festival Award, Best Animated Short. It received an award for Best Short Documentary at the 2009 Imagine Native Film + Media Arts Festival, Toronto, and the TEUEIKAN Second Prize at the 2009 First Peoples' Festival (Land InSights), Montréal. The film was a finalist for the Writers Guild of Canada 2010 Screenwriting Award for Short Subjects.

== Festivals ==
- "Tromsø International Film Festival, Frozen Land-Moving Pictures", Jan. 18-23, 2011
- "Atlantic Film Festival", Sept. 16-25, 2010, Halifax, Nova Scotia
- "Sprockets: Toronto International Film Festival for Children", April 17–23, 2010
- "ECOFILMS: Rhodos International Films + Visual Arts Festival", 2010
- "Animation Celebration!", Museum of the American Indian, New York, February 2010
- "American Indian Film Festival", Nov. 6-14, 2009, San Francisco, CA
- "ImagiNATIVE Film - Media Arts Festival", Oct. 14-18, 2009, Toronto
- "Reel to Real International Film Festival for Youth, Vancouver BC, 2009
- "The Times BFI 53rd London Film Festival", 14–29 October 2009
- "Dreamspeakers Film Festival", June 18–21, 2009
- "Available Light Film Festival," Yukon Arts Center, 2009

== See also ==
- Angela Sidney
- Raven in mythology
- Prometheus
- Kwanlin Dün First Nation
- Carcross/Tagish First Nation
