= Found film =

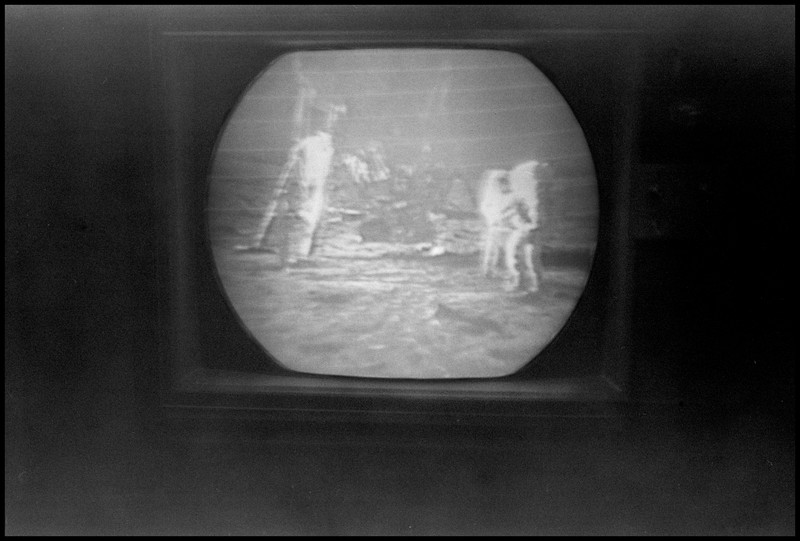
Image of TV screen with Apollo 11 site on the Moon discovered on 620 Kodak Kodacolor X film from Brownie Six-20 Flash camera.

Found film is the most common name for the still film or movie footage found exposed but undeveloped; it is also often referred to as undeveloped film, or forgotten film. A well known found film was found in 1930 at the shore of arctic island Kvitøya; the film had recoverable images of the last days of S. A. Andrée's Arctic Balloon Expedition of 1897.

== Sources ==
Old, exposed films are rare finds; before introduction of online auction systems, the common sources were family archives and antiques stores. Today, online auctions are the main source. Most of the found films were discovered inside the old simple box-type cameras which were forgotten, lost, discarded or abandoned by the owners.

== Development of old films ==
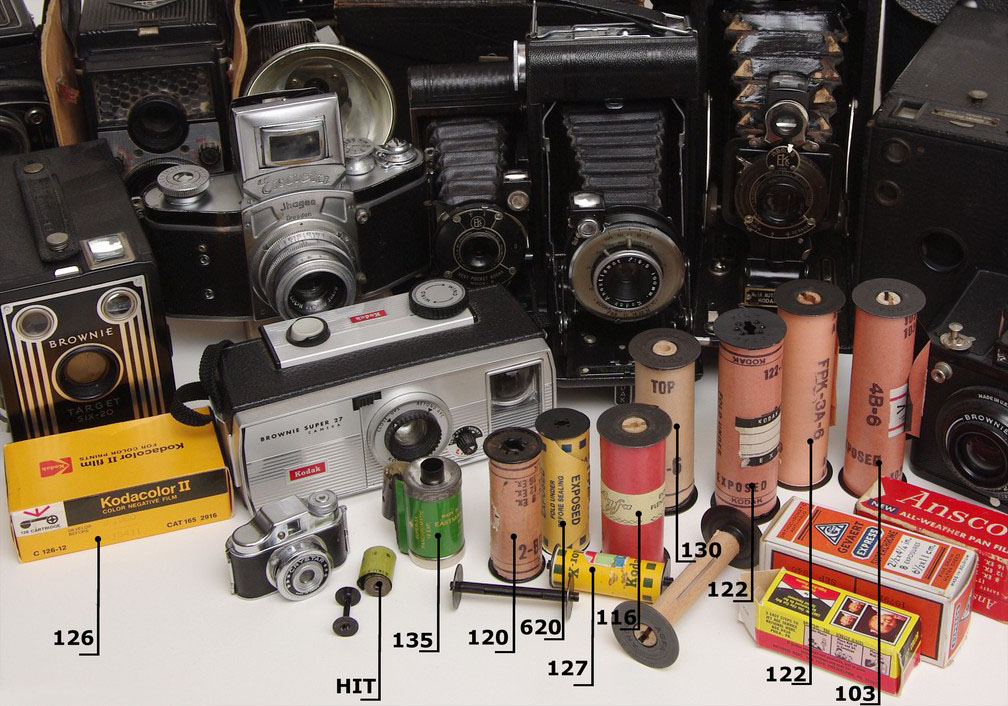
Old exposed films along with cameras where they were found.

Several photo lab services specialize in development of old outdated films. The self-processing by photo enthusiasts is common but not recommended since the latent image is not recoverable most of the time without special procedures such as use of high-contrast active developer at the very low temperatures (as low as 0 °C/32 °F). The two popular standard developers used to process outdated films are Kodak HC-110 and Kodak D-19. The old color film is often processed as black and white since color dyes usually decompose faster than silver-based layer.
