= Now Is the Time (film) =

- Directed by: Christopher Auchter
- Produced by: Selwyn Jacob
- Starring: Robert Davidson
- Edited by: Sarah Hedar
- Music by: Genevieve Vincent
- Production company: National Film Board of Canada
- Release date: September 7, 2019 (TIFF)
- Running time: 16 minutes
- Country: Canada
- Language: English

Now Is the Time (Haida: Waaydanaa) is a Canadian documentary film, directed by Christopher Auchter and released in 2019. Created to mark the 50th anniversary of Haida artist Robert Davidson carving and erecting a totem pole on Haida Gwaii in 1969 for the first time in nearly a century, the film blends historical footage from Eugene Boyko's 1970 documentary film This Was the Time with contemporary footage, including the now elderly Davidson's own reflections on the historic importance of his project. The film was made as part of a National Film Board of Canada project, encouraging indigenous filmmakers to make new works responding to and recontextualizing the sometimes colonialist outsider perspectives reflected in many of the organization's old documentaries on First Nations and Inuit cultures.

The film premiered on September 7, 2019 at the 2019 Toronto International Film Festival. It was subsequently screened at the 2020 Sundance Film Festival, and was selected for inclusion in Op-Docs, The New York Times streaming platform for short documentary films.

The film received a Canadian Screen Award nomination for Best Short Documentary at the 8th Canadian Screen Awards in 2020.

Waaydanaa, a Haida language version of the film, was released in 2024.
