= Cindy Blackstock =

Canadian Gitxsan activist (born c. 1964)

Cindy Blackstock OC FRSC
- Born: c. 1964; Burns Lake, British Columbia, Canada
- Education: University of British Columbia; McGill University; Loyola University Chicago; University of Toronto
- Occupations: Social worker; academic; activist
- Organization(s): First Nations Child and Family Caring Society of Canada

Cindy Blackstock OC FRSC (born c. 1964) is a Canadian Gitxsan activist for child welfare and executive director of the First Nations Child and Family Caring Society of Canada. She is also a professor for the School of Social Work at McGill University. She is most known for her role in the Canadian Human Rights Tribunal that in 2016 determined the Canadian government was discriminating against First Nations children by underfunding certain child and family welfare services on the basis of race and ethnic origin

== Early life and career ==
Blackstock was born in 1964 in Burns Lake, British Columbia. She has a Bachelor of Arts Degree (UBC), two master's degrees (Management from McGill University; Jurisprudence in Children's Law and Policy from Loyola University Chicago) and a PhD in social work (University of Toronto). In a 2016 article in The Globe and Mail, she was described as "Canada's 'relentless moral voice' for First Nations equality".

Blackstock has become an influential voice within the Indigenous, social work and child rights communities. Blackstock has spoken out about the systemic inequalities in public services experienced by First Nations children.

== Human rights complaint and federal court proceedings ==
In 2007 the Assembly of First Nations and her employer, the First Nations Child and Family Caring Society of Canada, filed a complaint pursuant to the Canadian Human Rights Act [CHRA] alleging Canada discriminates against First Nations children by consistently under-funding child welfare on reserves. In response the Department of Aboriginal Affairs put Blackstock under surveillance for "caring for First Nations children."

In their human rights complaint the First Nations Child and Family Caring Society of Canada and the Assembly of First Nations cited reports documenting the inequality and the impacts on children including reports issued by the Auditor General of Canada and Standing Committee of Public Accounts to support their discrimination claims.

The federal government has consistently challenged the jurisdiction of the Canadian Human Rights Act to deal with the complaint. Canada was unsuccessful in trying to convince the Canadian Human Rights Commission (the vetting body for complaints filed under the CHRA) to dismiss the complaint and it was referred for a full hearing by the Canadian Human Rights Tribunal in 2008. The federal government then tried to have the case dismissed by the Federal Court on the jurisdictional issue but was unsuccessful. The federal government brought a motion to have the case dismissed to the Canadian Human Rights Tribunal in December 2010 and the matter was heard by Canadian Human Rights Tribunal Chairperson, Shirish Chotalia, in June 2010. Chair Chotalia released her ruling in March 2011 dismissing the child welfare case suggesting that the CHRA required a mirror comparator group and child welfare services funded by the federal government for First Nations could not be compared to services provided to all others by the provinces and territories.

The First Nations Child and Family Caring Society, the Assembly of First Nations and the Canadian Human Rights Commission appealed the Canadian Human Rights Tribunal decision to Federal Court. In its ruling released in April 2012, the Federal Court overturned the decision by the Canadian Human Rights Tribunal suggesting the Canadian Human Rights Tribunal erred in law as no comparator group is required for a discrimination analysis and that the hearing was unfair as Tribunal Chair Chotalia reviewed thousands of pages of extraneous material in arriving at her decision. The Federal Court ruling cleared the way for a differently constituted panel at the Canadian Human Rights Tribunal to conduct a full hearing on the discrimination matter.

A subsequent appeal of the Federal Court ruling by the Canadian government was dismissed by the Federal Court of Appeal in March 2013. Meanwhile, the Canadian Human Rights Tribunal began hearing evidence on the discrimination claim on February 25, 2013.

On April 18, 2012, the Federal Court ruled that further scrutiny is needed to determine whether Ottawa is discriminating against First Nations children on reserves by underfunding child welfare services, and ordered the Tribunal to hold a new hearing on the case. On March 11, 2013, the Federal Court of Appeal dismissed Canada's appeal of the Federal Court Decision clearing the way for the Tribunal to hear evidence on the discrimination claim.

On January 26, 2016, in a landmark decision, the Canadian Human Rights Tribunal (2016 CHRT 2) ruled that the federal government's longstanding underfunding of child and family services on First Nations reserves and failure to ensure First Nations children can access government services on the same terms as other children (as per Jordan's Principle) discriminates against 163,000 First Nations children on the grounds of race and national and ethnic origin. The Tribunal ordered the government of Canada to cease its discriminatory conduct and the Tribunal maintained jurisdiction over the matter. On April 26, 2016 the Tribunal issued a second order (2016 CHRT 10) expressing concern regarding Canada's implementation of the January decision and ordering Canada to confirm they have applied Jordan's Principle to all children and all jurisdictional disputes by May 10, 2016. The Tribunal issued two further non-compliance orders against Canada in September 2016 (2016 CHRT 16) and May 2017 (2017 CHRT 14). The latter non-compliance order dealt with Jordan's Principle and the Tribunal found Canada had not fully complied with previous orders and linked Canada's non-compliance to the deaths of two 12-year-old girls. On February 1, 2018 (2018 CHRT 4), the Tribunal issued a further non-compliance order on child and family service funding requiring the federal government to fund prevention, intake and assessment, legal, building repairs, mental health (Ontario), and band representatives (Ontario) at their actual cost. In February 2019, the Tribunal issued an interim order (2019 CHRT 7)requiring Canada to apply Jordan's Principle to First Nations children in urgent circumstances who do not have Indian Status. The Tribunal has taken under reserve a final determination of the definition of First Nations child for Jordan's Principle and compensation for victims of Canada's discriminatory conduct.

In response to the Tribunal's order, the federal government provided over 200,000 products and services to First Nations children who needed them in 2018/2019.

Meanwhile, a class action lawsuit was filed by Xavier Moushoom, a former child in care, and Maurina Beadle, mother of a child entitled to Jordan's Principle services (Xavier Mouchoom v. Attorney General of Canada, Federal Court of Canada, (T-402-19). The class action has not yet been certified.

The court case and Blackstock's role is the subject of a 2016 documentary film by Alanis Obomsawin, We Can't Make the Same Mistake Twice, which had its world premiere on September 13 at the 2016 Toronto International Film Festival.

== Have a Heart Day ==
In 2012 the first Have a Heart Day gathering was held at Parliament Hill. It has been celebrated every February 14 since in multiple cities. The annual youth-led event is a project of the First Nations Family and Caring Society led by Cindy Blackstock.

== Awards ==
She has received over 50 awards including the Atkinson Charitable Foundation's Economic Justice fellowship (2009), National Aboriginal Achievement Awards (2011), Amnesty International Person of Conscience Award (2017), and the Janusz Korzak Medal for children's rights advocacy. She has also received 20 honorary doctorate degrees including the Doctor of Iyiniw Kiskeyihtamowinq Blue Quills First Nations University (2016) Asonamakew (Passing Knowledge on) from Blue Quills University in 2016 and an honorary doctorate from Osgoode Law School in 2017.

She was appointed as an Officer of the Order of Canada in 2019.
