= Jordan's Principle =

Canadian principle for First Nations children

Jordan's Principle Logo

Jordan's Principle is a child-first and needs-based principle used in public policy and administration in Canada to ensure that First Nations children living on and off reserve have equitable access to all government funded public services. It holds that First Nations children should not be denied access to public services while governments fight over who should pay. In order to ensure substantive equality, this can also include services that are not ordinarily available to other children. According to the First Nations Child & Family Caring Society of Canada, the organization that hosts the Jordan's Principle campaign:

Jordan's Principle ensures that First Nations children can access all public services when they need them. Services need to be culturally-based and take into full account the historical disadvantage linked to colonization that many First Nations children live with. The government of first contact pays for the service and resolves jurisdictional/payment disputes later.

Jordan's Principle is reflective of the non-discrimination provisions of the United Nations Convention on the Rights of the Child and Canadian domestic law that does not allow differential treatment on the basis of race or ethnic origin.

== History ==
Jordan's Principle was established by First Nations in response to the death of five-year-old Jordan River Anderson, a child from Norway House Cree Nation who suffered from Carey Fineman Ziter syndrome, a rare muscular disorder that required years of medical treatment in a Winnipeg hospital. After spending the first two years of his life in a hospital, doctors cleared Jordan to live in a family home near the hospital in Winnipeg. However, the federal and provincial governments could not resolve who was financially responsible for the necessary home care. For over two years, the Government of Canada and Manitoba provincial government continued to argue while Jordan remained in the hospital. In 2005, at the age of five, Jordan died in the hospital; he never had the opportunity to live in a family home.

In 2005, the First Nations Child & Family Caring Society released the Wen:De: We are Coming to the Light of Day report. Drawing on a team of over twenty researchers, the report provides a holistic and detailed review of the Government of Canada's First Nations child and family services policy and sets out recommendations for improvement. The research found that jurisdictional disputes continue to have significant impacts on the lived experiences of First Nations children, particularly those with disabilities. Among the policy recommendations, the report recommended that Jordan's Principle be adopted by the Government of Canada and provincial/territorial governments.

Private Members Motion 296 in support of Jordan's principle passed in the House of Commons of Canada on December 12, 2007.

In February 2015, the Assembly of First Nations (AFN) released the Jordan's Principle Working Group report named Without denial, delay or disruption: Ensuring First Nations children's access to equitable services through Jordan's Principle, highlighting several gaps in Jordan's Principle implementation.

In June 2015, the Indian Residential Schools Truth and Reconciliation Commission made Jordan's Principle the third of its 94 Calls to Action for governments in Canada, stating, "We call upon all levels of government to fully implement Jordan's Principle."

In November 2018, the Alberta provincial government signed a memorandum of understanding (MOU) on Jordan's Principle with the First Nations Health Consortium and the federal government.

In June 2019, the National Inquiry into Missing and Murdered Indigenous Women and Girls Calls for Justice 12.10 calls for the federal and provincial/territorial governments to immediately implement Jordan's Principle for all First Nations (Status and non-Status) children.

== Canadian human rights case ==
In January 2016, the Canadian Human Rights Tribunal, a Canadian legal institution with a mandate to adjudicate cases where there has been an alleged breach of the Canadian Human Rights Act, found that the Government of Canada's improper implementation of Jordan's Principle resulted in discrimination against First Nations children and youth on the basis of race and national ethnic origin and ordered the Government of Canada to "cease applying its narrow definition of Jordan's Principle and to take measures to immediately implement the full meaning and scope of Jordan's Principle."

Since January 2016, the Canadian Human Rights Tribunal has issued several remedial non-compliance orders against Canada for failing to abide by the original decision and implement the proper definition of Jordan's Principle. In September 2016, the Tribunal specified that Jordan's Principle applies to all First Nations children, not only those resident on reserve nor only those with "disabilities and those who present with a discrete, short-term issue." Despite this, two 2017 rulings (2017 CHRT 14 and 2017 CHRT 35 (amendment)) asserted Canada continued to repeat "its pattern of conduct and narrow focus with respect to Jordan's Principle" and provided guidelines for implementation. Canada was ordered to:

- Apply Jordan's Principle to all First Nations children under local age of majority living on and off reserve;
- Apply Jordan's Principle based on the needs of the child, not just what is typically available to other children (normative standard of care); and
- Ensure that administrative procedures do not delay service provision.

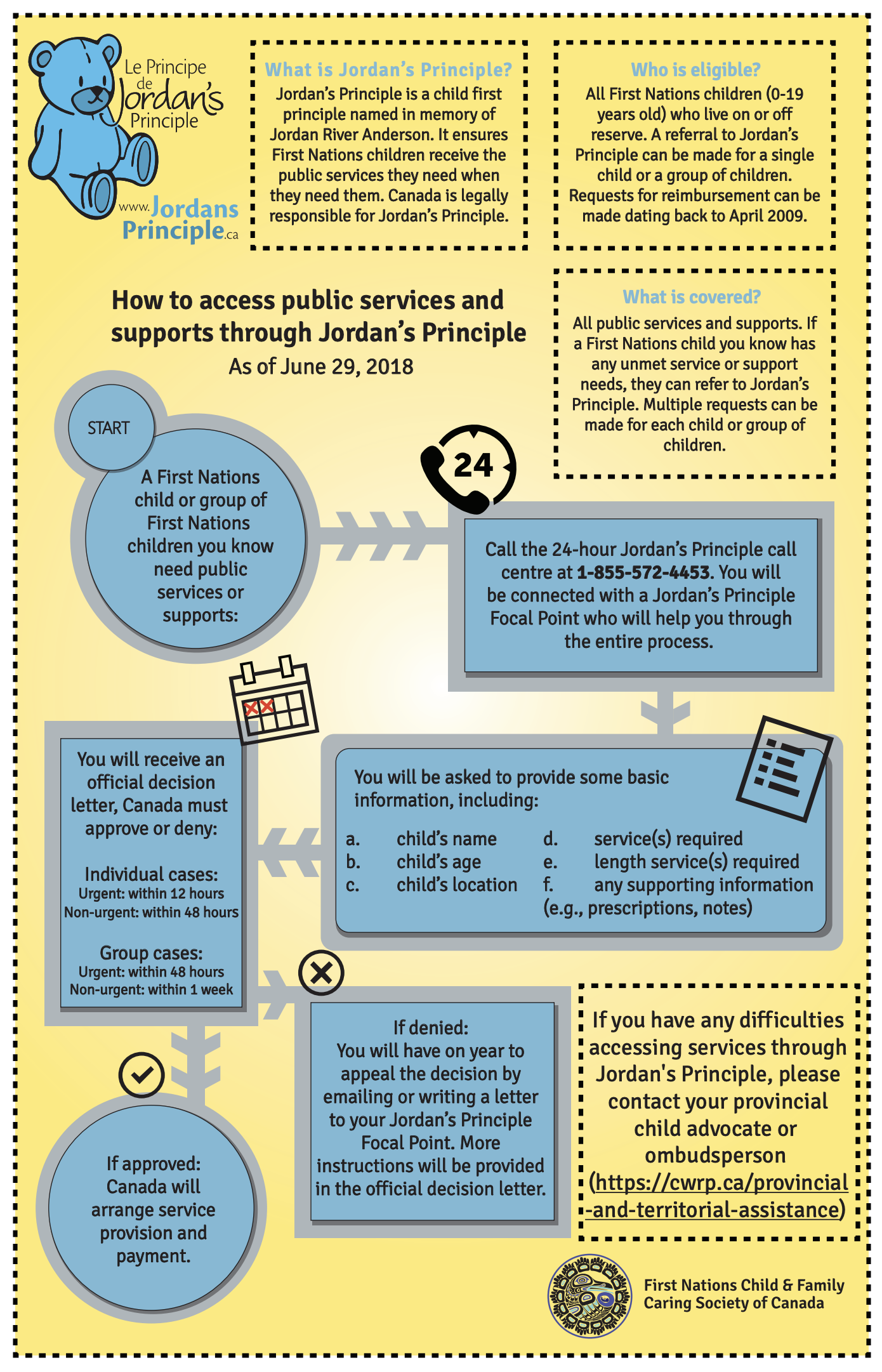
Jordan's Principle Information Poster June 29, 2018

The Tribunal also ordered Canada to follow specific timeframes when making a determination on a request:

- Individual cases:
  - Urgent: within 12 hours
  - Non-urgent: within 48 hours
- Group cases:
  - Urgent: within 48 hours
  - Non-urgent: within 1 week

In February 2019, the Canadian Human Rights Tribunal issued an interim ruling (2019 CHRT 7) on the definition of a "First Nations child" for the purposes of Jordan's Principle. Pending a full hearing on the matter, the Tribunal ordered Canada to extend Jordan's Principle to First Nations children without Indian Act status who live off-reserve but who are recognized by their Nation, and who have urgent and/or life-threatening needs.

The Canadian Human Rights Tribunal issued an order on compensation in 2019 (2019 CHRT 39). The Tribunal ruled that First Nations children and their families would receive the maximum compensation through the Canadian Human Rights Act ($40,000) for Canada's "wilful and reckless" discrimination, referring to it as a worst-case scenario under the Act. Canada was ordered to compensate certain First Nations children, and their parents or grandparents, who were affected by the discriminatory treatment in child welfare services since January 1, 2006 or were denied or experienced delays in services covered under Jordan's Principle since November 2, 2017.

The Government of Canada submitted a judicial review of the Canadian Human Rights Tribunal compensation order to the Federal Court in October 2019. Canada sought an order to quash all financial compensation and a motion to stay the Canadian Human Rights Tribunal proceedings until the Federal Court makes a decision on the judicial review. Hearings were held in November 2019 and Canada's stay motion was denied soon after.

Hearings on the definition of a First Nations child for Jordan's Principle were held March 27–28, 2019, and a ruling (2020 CHRT 20) was issued in July 2020. Canada was ordered to immediately recognize First Nations children who will become eligible for Indian Act status under S-3 implementation.The Tribunal found two further categories of First Nations children who would become eligible for Jordan's Principle following a further order: 1. First Nations children without Indian Act status who are recognized by their respective First Nations; and 2. First Nations children who do not have Indian Act status and who are not eligible for Indian Act status, but have a parent/guardian with, or who is eligible for, Indian Act status. The Tribunal ordered the parties to consult on a mechanism to identify these two categories. The parties include the Assembly of First Nations, the First Nations Child and Family Caring Society of Canada (the complainants), the Canadian Human Rights Commission, and the Attorney General of Canada.

In November 2020, the Canadian Human Rights Tribunal issued an order (2020 CHRT 36) confirming four categories of eligibility for Jordan's Principle submitted by the parties, in keeping with the direction in 2020 CHRT 20. These categories ensure that First Nations children living off-reserve without Indian Act status but who are recognized by their Nations can access Jordan's Principle. First Nations children meeting any one of the following criteria are eligible for consideration under Jordan's Principle:

- A child resident on or off reserve who is registered or eligible to be registered under the Indian Act, as amended from time to time;
- A child resident on or off reserve who has one parent/guardian who is registered or eligible to be registered under the Indian Act;
- A child resident on or off reserve who is recognized by their Nation for the purposes of Jordan's Principle; or
- The child is ordinarily resident on reserve.

The Tribunal also approved the default process submitted by the parties for recognizing a child for the purposes of Jordan's Principle and the parameters for funding First Nations for expenses incurred in recognition functions. The Tribunal made clear that recognition by a First Nation is for the purposes of Jordan's Principle only. It asserted further that Jordan's Principle is not a fixed budget program, but a legal obligation of the Government of Canada, meaning funding expands with the number of eligible children.

On December 22, 2020, Canada filed for judicial review of 2020 CHRT 20 and 2020 CHRT 36. Importantly, both 2020 CHRT 20 and 2020 CHRT 36 remain in place while the judicial review is underway.

Alanis Obomsawin's 2016 documentary film We Can't Make the Same Mistake Twice argues that the federal government has fought applying Jordan's Principle to such a degree that an $11-million fund set aside to cover its costs was never used. Anderson was also the subject of Obomsawin's 2019 film Jordan River Anderson, the Messenger.

== Jurisdictional disputes ==
In Canada, there is a lack of clarity between the federal and provincial/territorial governments around who should pay for government services for First Nations children even when the service is normally available to other children. Too often the practice is for the governments to deny or delay the child's receipt of services pending resolution of the payment dispute. Under Jordan's Principle, where a jurisdictional dispute arises between two government parties (provincial/territorial or federal) or between two departments or ministries of the same government, regarding payment for services for a First Nations child, the government or ministry/department of first contact must pay for the services without delay or disruption. The paying government party can refer the matter to jurisdictional dispute mechanisms after the service or support has been provided. A jurisdictional dispute is not always necessary for the application of Jordan's Principle.
