= On the Trail of the Far Fur Country =

2014 Canadian documentary film

- Directed by: Kevin Nikkel
- Written by: Chris Nikkel; Kevin Nikkel
- Produced by: Chris Nikkel; Kevin Nikkel
- Edited by: Kevin Nikkel
- Music by: Nathan Reimer
- Production company: Five Door Films
- Distributed by: Winnipeg Film Group
- Release date: March 19, 2014
- Running time: 80 minutes
- Country: Canada
- Language: English

On the Trail of the Far Fur Country is a Canadian documentary film, directed by Kevin Nikkel and released in 2014. The film documents the 2012 screening tour of Nikkel and Peter Geller's restored version of the 1920 film The Romance of the Far Fur Country.

Although considered a lost film for many years, film historian Peter Geller found the original raw footage of The Romance of the Far Fur Country in the British Film Institute archives in 1996. It was then transferred to the Hudson's Bay Company archives, where Geller and Nikkel worked to reconstruct the film, before undertaking a screening tour in 2012 under the title Return of the Far Fur Country, both in major Canadian cities and in the smaller First Nations and Inuit communities where the original film had been shot.

The film won the Colin Low Award at the 2015 DOXA Documentary Film Festival.
