= Trick or Treaty? =

- Film poster
- Directed by: Alanis Obomsawin
- Written by: Alanis Obomsawin
- Produced by: Alanis Obomsawin
- Cinematography: René Sioui Labelle, Philippe Amiguet, Michael Darby
- Edited by: Alison Burns
- Music by: Alain Auger
- Production company: National Film Board of Canada
- Distributed by: National Film Board of Canada
- Release date: September 5, 2014 (Toronto International Film Festival)
- Running time: 85 minutes
- Country: Canada

Trick or Treaty? is a 2014 Canadian documentary feature film by Alanis Obomsawin about Treaty 9, a 1905 agreement in which First Nations peoples in northern Ontario surrendered their sovereign rights. The film is the first by an Indigenous filmmaker to be selected to the Masters program at the Toronto International Film Festival, and is the 43rd film by Obomsawin for the National Film Board of Canada.

== Content ==
In the film, Obomsawin interviews Nipissing University professor John Long, author of the book Treaty No. 9: Making the Agreement to Share the Land in Far Northern Ontario in 1905, Stan Louttit, Grand Chief of the Mushkegowuk Council, and others about whether First Nations signatories were deceived by treaty commissioners, who offered oral promises that were not included in the final written agreement. The documentary places significant focus on the way the treaty was interpreted by First Nations peoples and the Canadian government, often referencing two versions of the treaty: the written version, and the oral version. The documentary offers insight into how treaties can be interpreted and poses the question of who has the right to interpret a treaty? The film also looks at efforts today by the Idle No More movement to fight for First Nations rights and documents the Nishiyuu, a 1,600 kilometre (990 mile) march by a group of Cree youth from the Eeyou Istchee to the Canadian capital in the winter of 2013 to bring their concerns to Parliament Hill. The film's closing sequence is set to John Trudell's song "Crazy Horse."

== Release ==
Louttit, described by Obomsawin as the inspiration to make Trick or Treaty?, died several months before the film's premiere at the Toronto International Film Festival, on September 5, 2014. Obomsawin has said she planned to make the film after Louttit had informed her of plans to re-enact the 1905 signing of the treaty. Louttit's headdress was placed by an empty chair at the Toronto premiere by Obomsawin.
