= The Romance of the Far Fur Country =

1920 film

- Directed by: Harold M. Wyckoff
- Production company: Hudson's Bay Company
- Release date: May 23, 1920
- Country: Canada
- Language: Silent

The Romance of the Far Fur Country is a historical documentary film portraying Arctic fur trappers in 1919 to commemorate the 250th anniversary of the Hudson's Bay Company in 1920. Directed by Harold M. Wyckoff, it is one of the earliest documentaries depicting the lives of the Arctic fur trappers.

== History ==
To commemorate the 250th anniversary of Hudson's Bay Company (HBC) in 1920, founded in 1670 and then an undisputed leader of the international fur trade, the company decided to bookmark and document its 250 years of journey as part of written history, gramophone recording, and as a feature film. To make the promotional feature film, advertising the company's working history and commercial land holdings in Canada's North, HBC hired two cameramen from New York City and sent them on board HBC's ice-breaker. This 'silent' film later became known as The Romance of the Far Fur Country.

The film crew sailed from Montreal to Arctic circle. As reported in a BBC article, in the next course of nine months, they captured extraordinary footage never done before. They captured more than 75,000 feet of film equivalent to 8 hours of viewing time. It is reported that the crew filmed the documentary by walking laboriously on land, across the ice, and traveling by dogsled over a frozen river. The crew filmed from canoes on the Abitibi river and had to portage canoes over their shoulders.

The film was premiered in Allen theatre at Winnipeg on May 23, 1920. It was later released across western Canada and in London.

== Memorable scenes ==
As reported by the BBC, the documentary portrays scenes never shown before. In one scene, an Inuk man named 'Inqmilayuk' talks with the captain of the RMS Nascopie (which carried supplies bound for Arctic fur trade posts), Edmund Mack, with titles reading "I was but a youth when I learned to hunt, as my fathers did before me." In another scene, Inqmilayuk's romantic partner 'Innotseak' is introduced with titles: "She told me that she loved me." And in the final scene, Inqmilayuk and Innotseak are shown walking into the horizon as lovebirds.

In words of Peter Geller, a Canadian visual historian, these scenes places the Romance of the Far Fur Country in the context of the history of documentary films. The narrative and filmic techniques used in HBC's film were later employed by Robert J. Flaherty, who made the commercially successful Nanook of the North and is hailed as father of documentary films by John Grierson.

== Legacy ==
Although considered a lost film for many years, Geller found the original raw footage in the British Film Institute archives in 1996. It was then transferred to the Hudson Bay Company archives, where Geller and filmmaker Kevin Nikkel worked to reconstruct the film, before undertaking a screening tour in 2012 under the title Return of the Far Fur Country, both in major Canadian cities and in the smaller Arctic communities where the original film had been shot.

During the tour, Nikkel also shot footage for a documentary film about the tour and the reactions of the film's audiences, which was released in 2014 as On the Trail of the Far Fur Country.

In 2015, Wyckoff's family donated his personal records from the film to the Archives of Manitoba.
