= Jordan River Anderson, the Messenger =

2019 Canadian documentary film

- Film poster
- Directed by: Alanis Obomsawin
- Written by: Alanis Obomsawin
- Produced by: Alanis Obomsawin
- Narrated by: Alanis Obomsawin
- Edited by: Alison Burns
- Music by: Lauren Bélec; Michel Dubeau
- Distributed by: National Film Board of Canada
- Release date: 10 September 2019 (Toronto)
- Running time: 65 minutes
- Country: Canada
- Language: English

Jordan River Anderson, the Messenger is a 2019 Canadian documentary film directed by Alanis Obomsawin. The film profiles Jordan River Anderson, a young boy from the Norway House Cree Nation in Manitoba whose permanent lifelong hospitalization with a rare genetic disorder caused a political fight between the provincial and federal governments over the cost of his medical care, resulting in the establishment of the new Jordan's Principle around equity of access to health and social services for First Nations children.

The film premiered at the 2019 Toronto International Film Festival. At the 2019 Vancouver International Film Festival, the film won the award for Best Canadian Documentary. As of October 2021, 100% of the eight critical reviews compiled on Rotten Tomatoes are positive, with an average rating of 7.4/10.
