= We Can't Make the Same Mistake Twice =

- Directed by: Alanis Obomsawin
- Produced by: Alanis Obomsawin
- Starring: Cindy Blackstock
- Production company: National Film Board
- Release date: 13 September 2016 (TIFF)
- Running time: 163 minutes
- Country: Canada
- Language: English

We Can't Make the Same Mistake Twice is a 2016 Canadian documentary film by Alanis Obomsawin about the First Nations activist Cindy Blackstock and her court case against the federal government of Canada for underfunding social services to children living on First Nations reserves.

The film details how the federal government has resisted applying Jordan's Principle to restitution efforts. Also appearing in the film is Assembly of First Nations lawyer David Nahwegahbow, who describes the government's efforts to avoid living up to its agreements with Indigenous peoples. To make the film, Obomsawin followed the case for six years, recording testimony from all sides.

We Can't Make the Same Mistake Twice is the 49th film that Obomsawin has directed for the National Film Board of Canada—with her 50th, Norway House, in production.

== Release ==
The film premiered at the 2016 Toronto International Film Festival. Subsequent Canadian film festival screenings included the 2016 imagineNATIVE Film + Media Arts Festival.
