= Mushkegowuk Council =

Tribal council

- ᐅᒪᐡᑫᑯ ᐅᑭᒫᐎᐎᐣ
- Orthographic map of the Mushkegowuk regional chief's council of Cree First Nations that highlights the location of the Mushkegowuk First Nations territory on the North American continent
- Type: Tribal council
- Legal status: Non-profit organization
- Purpose: Political advocacy and service delivery for member First Nations
- Headquarters: Moose Factory, Ontario, Canada
- Region served: Northern Ontario (James Bay region)
- Members: 8 First Nations
- Official language: English, Cree
- Grand Chief: Jonathon Solomon
- Parent organization: Nishnawbe Aski Nation
- Website: www.mushkegowuk.ca

Mushkegowuk Council (pointed: ᐅᒪᐡᑫᑯ ᐅᑭᒫᐎᐎᐣ (omashkeko okimāwiwin); unpointed: ᐅᒪᐡᑫᑯ ᐅᑭᒪᐎᐎᐣ), or officially as the Mushkegowuk Tribal Council, is a non-profit regional chiefs' council representing Cree First Nations in northern Ontario, Canada. The council, located in Moose Factory, Ontario provides advisory services and program delivery to its member nations.

== Council ==
The council is made up of a representing chief from each of the eight member communities. The chiefs provide political direction to the organization in its strategic planning, government relations and policy development. To assist in these activities, the council maintains a political and advocacy staff to support its efforts in helping their communities to prosper. In turn, the council is a member of Nishnawbe Aski Nation, a tribal political organization representing the majority of Treaty 5 and Treaty 9 First Nations in northern Ontario.

The council's current grand chief is Jonathon Solomon. Musician Lawrence "Wapistan" Martin has also previously served as grand chief.

== Member First Nations ==
- Attawapiskat First Nation (ᐋᐦᑕᐙᐱᐢᑲᑐᐎ ᐃᓂᓂᐧᐊᐠ Āhtawāpiskatowi ininiwak)
- Chapleau Cree First Nation (ᔕᑊᓗ ᐃᓂᓂᐗᐠ šaplo ininiwak)
- Fort Albany First Nation (ᐲᐦᑖᐯᒄ ᐃᓕᓕᐗᒃ pîhtâpek ililiwak)
- Kashechewan First Nation (ᑫᔒᒋᐗᓐ ᐃᓕᓕᐗᒃ kêšîciwan ililiwak)
- Missanabie Cree First Nation (ᒪᓯᓈᐴᔾ ᐃᓂᓂᐗᐠ masinâpôy ininiwak)
- Moose Cree First Nation (ᒨᓱᓂᔨ ᐃᓕᓕᐗᒃ môsoniyi ililiwak
- Taykwa Tagamou Nation (ᑕᐟᑾ ᑕᑲᒪᐤ ᐃᓂᓂᐗᐠ tatkwa takamaw ininiwak)
- Weenusk First Nation (ᐐᓈᐢᑯ ᐃᓂᓂᐗᐠ wînâsko ininiwak)

== See also ==
- Trick or Treaty?, a documentary film about Treaty 9, featuring Council Grand Chief Stan Louttit
