= Whitefish Lake 6, Ontario =

Whitefish Lake 6
- Indian reserve
- Whitefish Lake Indian Reserve No. 6
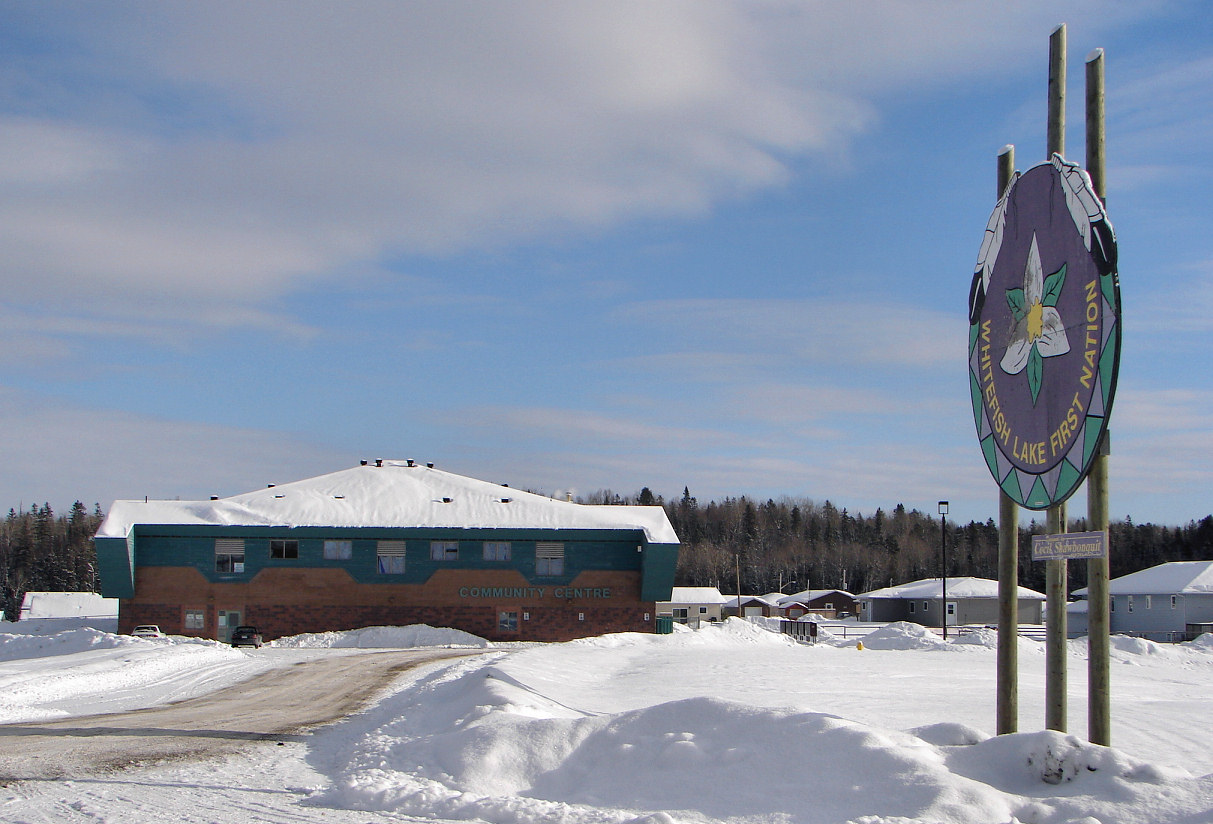
- Whitefish Lake community centre

- Location within Ontario
- Coordinates: 46°18′N 81°16′W
- Country: Canada
- Province: Ontario
- District: Sudbury
- First Nation: Atikameksheng Anishnawbek

Area
  - Land: 172.68 km^{2} (66.67 sq mi)

Population (2016)
  - Total: 386
  - Density: 2.2/km^{2} (5.7/sq mi)
- Website: www.atikameksheng anishnawbek.ca

Whitefish Lake 6 is a reserve in Ontario, Canada. It is inhabited by the Ojibwa Atikameksheng Anishnawbek First Nation.

It is immediately south of the community of Naughton in Greater Sudbury, and is considered part of Greater Sudbury's Census Metropolitan Area. In the Canada 2011 Census, the community of Whitefish Lake had a population of 394 living on the reserve. It is bordered by both Greater Sudbury and the Unorganized North Sudbury District.

In 2010, the community was selected as the host community for Building Homes and Building Skills, a project by television personality Mike Holmes to train First Nations people in construction and building trades.

== Notable members ==
- Loma Lyns, singer and songwriter
- Darlene Naponse, writer and filmmaker

== See also ==
- N'Swakamok Native Friendship Centre, Greater Sudbury, ON
