= Falls Around Her =

- Film poster
- Directed by: Darlene Naponse
- Written by: Darlene Naponse
- Produced by: Jamie Manning; Darlene Naponse; Simone Urdl; Jennifer Weiss
- Starring: Tantoo Cardinal; Tina Keeper; Gail Maurice
- Cinematography: Ray Dumas
- Edited by: Teresa De Luca
- Production companies: Baswewe Films; The Film Farm
- Release date: September 8, 2018 (TIFF)
- Running time: 101 minutes
- Country: Canada
- Languages: English; Ojibwa

Falls Around Her is a 2018 Canadian drama film, written, produced, and directed by Darlene Naponse. The film stars Tantoo Cardinal as Mary Birchbark, an internationally famous First Nations musician who returns to her home community to recharge and reevaluate her life, only to find that her fame is not so easily left behind.

The cast also includes Tina Keeper, Gail Maurice, Johnny Issaluk and J.D. Nicholsen. The film was shot on the Atikameksheng Anishnawbek First Nation reserve near Sudbury, Ontario.

Despite Cardinal's long and distinguished career as an actress, Falls Around Her was her first-ever starring role as the main protagonist in a film.

The film premiered at the 2018 Toronto International Film Festival. It subsequently screened as the opening gala of the imagineNATIVE Film + Media Arts Festival in October, where it won the Air Canada Audience Choice Award. It opened commercially in April 2019.

== Reception ==
On the review aggregator website Rotten Tomatoes, 100% of 9 critics' reviews are positive, with an average rating of 6.8/10.

Richard Crouse gave the film three and a half stars and wrote, "Falls Around Her is a tale of resilience. When we first meet Mary she's disconnected from the very things that ground her. As she slowly takes back her life, easing out of the road work and a new show in a new town every night, she opens herself to rediscovering what is really important, family, friends, being happy. She is not a victim. She's in control, putting past trauma in the rearview mirror. Cardinal is a living breathing embodiment of Mary's renewal. Her performance dominates the film, a fiery mix of experience, hurt and joy. It's remarkable work, done with a minimum of dialogue, that presents one of the most complex and interesting characters in recent memory."
