= Rustic Oracle =

2019 Canadian film directed by Sonia Boileau

- Directed by: Sonia Boileau
- Written by: Sonia Boileau
- Produced by: Jason Brennan
- Starring: Carmen Moore; Lake Delisle
- Cinematography: Patrick Kaplin
- Edited by: Randy Kelly
- Music by: Alain Auger
- Production company: Nish Media
- Release date: September 29, 2019 (VIFF)
- Running time: 101 minutes
- Country: Canada
- Language: English

Rustic Oracle is a Canadian drama film, directed by Sonia Boileau and released in 2019. An exploration of the issue of Missing and Murdered Indigenous Women, the film stars Lake Kahentawaks Delisle and Carmen Moore as Ivy and Susan, the younger sister and mother of missing teenager Heather (Mckenzie Kahnekaroroks Deer), who embark on a trek to find Heather themselves due to a lack of action on her case by the police.

The film's cast also includes Kevin Parent, Margo Kane, Alex Rice and Brittany LeBorgne, with a cameo and voiceover by Kawennáhere Devery Jacobs, to end the film, as an adult Ivy.

The film, Boileau's second feature film after Le Dep (2015) but her first English-language feature, was shot in 2018, primarily around Oka and Kanesatake, Quebec. The film's title derives from its use of the dandelion as a recurring motif; according to Boileau, "The dandelion is perceived as a weed when actually it’s the strongest of all the flowers. It contains powerful medicine, and it’s viewed as a magical thing that will carry your wishes and memories into the wind when you blow on it. So it’s all about how we perceive someone versus how they actually are."

== Distribution ==
The film premiered at the 2019 Vancouver International Film Festival.

It was originally slated for commercial release on March 27, 2020, but its release was cancelled due to the COVID-19 pandemic in Canada. It continued to screen on the online platforms of film festivals, and had several weeks of commercial screenings in Canadian cities after theatres were reopened in the summer. It has since been released to numerous video on demand platforms, both in Canada and internationally.

== Awards ==
Boileau received a nomination for the Directors Guild of Canada's DGC Award for Best Direction in a Feature Film in 2020. Delisle and Moore both won acting awards at the 2019 American Indian Film Festival, and the film won the awards for Best Picture and Best Lead Performance by a Female (Moore) at the 2020 Leo Awards. Carmen Moore won the award for Best Actress from the Vancouver chapter of the ACTRA Awards.

Moore received a Canadian Screen Award nomination for Best Actress at the 9th Canadian Screen Awards in 2021.
