= Justin Ducharme =

Canadian film director and screenwriter

Justin Ducharme is a Métis film director and screenwriter from St. Ambroise, Manitoba, Canada, and currently based in Vancouver, British Columbia. His feature directorial debut film Seventeen is scheduled to premiere in the Discovery program at the 2026 Toronto International Film Festival.

Ducharme appeared as a teenager in the 2012 docudrama film We Were Children before beginning his own filmmaking career. He made a number of short films before becoming more widely known for the 2023 web series KIN. He wrote the first draft of the screenplay for Seventeen in 2018, with it taking further shape after he participated in the imagineNATIVE Film and Media Arts Festival's screenwriting lap program in 2019-20.

In 2020 Ducharme and Amber Dawn received a Lambda Literary Award nomination for LGBTQ Anthology at the 32nd Lambda Literary Awards, as coeditors of Hustling Verse: An Anthology of Sex Workers' Poetry.

In 2022 he was also a participant in the Sundance Film Festival's Native Film Lab program.

Ducharme staged a public reading of Seventeen's screenplay at Emily Carr University of Art and Design in 2024, prior to the film going into production in 2025.

== Filmography ==
- To Be Alright – 2013
- Him/Her – 2016
- Positions – 2018
- The Dancer – 2019
- If You're Going to Talk About Me Behind My Back, At Least Check Out My Great Ass – 2023
- KIN – 2023
- Seventeen – 2026
