= Atikameksheng Anishnawbek First Nation =

Ojibway First Nation in Ontario, Canada

- Band No. 224
- Adikamegosheng Anishinaabeg
- People: Ojibwe
- Headquarters: 25 Reserve Road, Naughton
- Province: Ontario

Land
- Main reserve: Whitefish Lake 6
- Land area: 197.5 km^{2} (76.3 sq mi)

Population (2024)
- On reserve: 403
- On other land: 44
- Off reserve: 1171
- Total population: 1618

Government
- Chief: Craig Nootchtai
- Council: Lesley MacNeil; Vance Nootchtai; Arthur Petahtegoose; Harvey Petahtegoose; Jennifer Petahtegoose

Tribal Council
- Anishinabek Nation; Mamaweswen, The North Shore Tribal Council

Website
- https://atikamekshenganishnawbek.ca/

Atikameksheng Anishnawbek (Anishinaabe language: Adikamegosheng Anishinaabeg, syncoped as Dikmegsheng Nishnaabeg), formerly known as the Whitefish Lake First Nation, is an Ojibway First Nation in northern Ontario, Canada. Its reserve is located at Whitefish Lake 6 on the shores of Whitefish Lake, 20 km southwest of Sudbury.

It is immediately south of the community of Naughton in Greater Sudbury, and is considered part of Greater Sudbury's Census Metropolitan Area. In the Canada 2016 Census, the community of Whitefish Lake had a population of 386 living on the reserve, a decrease of 2.0% from 2011.

Atikameksheng membership have hunting and fishing rights within the Robinson-Huron Treaty Area. An annual pow-wow is held in July each year.

The current chief of the First Nation is Craig Nootchtai.

In May 2008, the chief and council of Atikameksheng Anishnawbek announced litigation against Canada and Ontario for violating the Robinson-Huron Treaty, which states that the First Nation should have been granted a reserve much larger than Whitefish Lake 6.

In 2010, the community was selected as the host community for Building Homes and Building Skills, a project by television personality Mike Holmes to train First Nations people in construction and building trades.

The community passed a resolution in 2006 to request that the federal government change the community's official name from Whitefish Lake, to realign with the traditional name Atikameksheng Anishnawbek. The name change officially took effect in October 2013.

In 2016, some location filming for the Sudbury-produced television drama series Cardinal took place on the reserve. The films of Darlene Naponse, a writer and film director from the community, have also been shot on-reserve, including Cradlesong, Every Emotion Costs, Falls Around Her, Stellar and Aki.

== Notable members ==
- Loma Lyns, singer and songwriter
- Darlene Naponse, filmmaker and writer
