= Kayak to Klemtu =

2017 Canadian drama film

- Film poster
- Directed by: Zoe Leigh Hopkins
- Written by: Zoe Leigh Hopkins; Scooter Corkle; Michael Sparaga
- Produced by: Daniel Bekerman
- Starring: Ta'Kaiya Blaney; Sonja Bennett; Evan Adams
- Cinematography: Vince Arvidson
- Edited by: Simone Smith
- Music by: Oleksa Lozowchuk
- Production company: Scythia Films
- Distributed by: Mongrel Media
- Release date: October 20, 2017 (imagineNATIVE)
- Running time: 90 minutes
- Country: Canada
- Language: English

Kayak to Klemtu is a Canadian drama film, directed by Zoe Leigh Hopkins and released in 2017. The film stars Ta'Kaiya Blaney as Ella, a teenage First Nations girl from Vancouver who decides following the death of her uncle Bear (Evan Adams) to take up his activism against a proposed pipeline development, and undertakes a 500-kilometre kayak trip to the family's ancestral home at Klemtu to testify at the pipeline hearings.

The film's cast also includes Sonja Bennett, Carmel Armit, Tyler Burrows, Jared Ager-Foster and Lorne Cardinal.

The film premiered on October 20, 2017, at the imagineNATIVE Film and Media Arts Festival, where it won the Audience Choice Award. It went into commercial release in 2018.

At the 2018 Leo Awards, Blaney won the award for Best Actress and Bennett won the award for Best Supporting Actress.
