= Mema Wilda =

- Born: Vaimoana Tumema Sesega-Peters; Samoa
- Genres: Folk, rock, pop, psyechedelic
- Occupation: Musician
- Member of: Wilda

Mema Wilda is a New Zealand-based folk and rock singer. Her brand of music has been described as folk and psychedelic. She is also a New Zealand Battle of the Bands winner. Her brother is Samoan-born rocker, Levi Sesega.

== Background ==
Wilda is originally from Samoa. Her birth name is Vaimoana Tumema Sesega-Peters. She started out singing at family functions and then later weddings and Sāmoan functions. In 2017, she moved from Samoa to Auckland, New Zealand. She also spent some time in New York City. She is also a songweriter. According to Carlos Norton's article "The Bridge: A harmony of music and family" on Times.co.nz (31 August 2024), Wilda was asked about what drove her to song writing and her answer was "Why not?"

She has performed on stage with her brother Levi Sesega aka Michael Sesega. Her brother formed Samoa's first heavy rock band, The Half Days which grew out of Samoan Alchemist. He heads the Levi Lights On Project who had a single "The People Awake" in 2025.

As of 2024 she is fronting the band Mema Wilda & The Dopamen which has been described as having mainly a psychedelic-folk and rock sound.

== Career ==
=== 2010s ===
Mema Wilda performed the song "Pese o le tatau" which was commissioned for the 2018 documentary film Marks of Mana, a film about Pacific female indigenous tattoos. The film which was produced and directed by Lisa Taouma was apparently the first film to cover the subject.

Also in 2018, Wilda was booked to appear in a double bill with brother Levi Sesega on 7 October at the Vic in Devonport, Auckland.

On 23 March 2019, Wilda was part of the "Levi Lights on Project and Mema Wilda" bill at the Leigh Sawmill Cafe in Auckland. Their performance was reviewed by Mike Thornton of Ambient Lights. Thornton said that they demonstrated wonderful song making skills and the commanding control that they had over their instruments. The crystal clarity and accuracy of their performances was also noted. He also said that Wilda had a soft psychedelic and euphoric sense to her delivery. One of the songs that Wilda performed was the Dolly Parton song "Jolene". He said it was glorious, slow sad and sweet.

==== "Blue" ====
Working with producer Mitch French, Wilda recorded the song "Blue" at Black Dog Recording Studio in 2019. Her debut single, it was set for release on 15 August that year. The review by Jamie Denton was posted on MNZ that month. Making note of Wilda's "clean, clear, and wonderfully restrained vocal, Denton also mentioned Wilda's songwriting prowess and how the song takes the listener for a ride and holding them until it's finished with the listener. He called it a beautiful song with lush production. The song was given 5/5 stars.

=== 2020s ===
Mema released the single "How I Long" in 2021. It was reviewed by Ben Reugg of MNZ. Giving it five stars, he noted the emotion in Wilda's vocals and the good production. He said that he could be happy to listen to it over and over. It was also reviewed by Jane Howkins of York Calling. Howkins said that the single was quite poppy and had an incredibly raw and emotional feeling that was missing in a lot of pop music. She also noted the stunning melody.

Mema was booked to appear at the Tuning Fork, an Auckland venue on 18 June 2021, Wilda was the opening act for the show that was headlined by Sam Bartells and Albi and the Wolves. Accompanied by Sam Stretch who played guitar, cajon and bass on different songs, she went through an acoustic set that was described by Melodic Magazine reviewer Maggie Cocco as "awkward, humorous, and ultimately endearing". The atmospheric and sultry effect of the TC vocal harmonizer was noted. Cocco said that it was in the early days of Wilda's career and that it was exciting to think where she will go.

On 18 December 2021, ahead of second place contestants, Dave and the Dirty Humans and third place tie contestants, House of Ousey and Little Sunday, Wilda won first prize in the 2021 Battle of the Bands event.

In April 2023, Wilda and her band were booked to open for Larkin Poe at the Powerstation in Auckland. Her single "Going Wild" was also being released. She was also interviewed by Radio New Zealand which was published on 9 April 2023.

==== "Going Wild" ====
"Going Wild" was reviewed by Kev Rowland of House of Prog Radio who gave it 10 out of 10. Rowland had noticed a change in her music and with the single, he said that it was a nice chugging rock number. He also noted the quality of Greg Haver's production. He finished off with a question of "when do we get the album?".

In a review of Larkin Poe's performance by Marty Duda of 13th Floor, Duda said that she was more than capable of warming up the crowd and she knew how to take command of the stage. Her powerful vocals and moves were also noted. Mema performed her song "Going Wild" and "You Want it Darker", a Leonard Cohen composition.

==== Further activities ====
As of September 2023, her band which is called Wilda was made up of herself on guitar and lead vocal, Kento Mori on lead guitar, Shellita Goldsmith on drums, Mitch French on bass and additional vocalist Hariata Makiha.

In August 2024, Mema and Michael Levin Sesega were part of the "Wilde and Wilda" show with Jesse Wilde and his daughter Faith that was held at the Uxbridge Arts and Culture venue.

Mema and singer-songwriter, Eden Iris were booked to appear at the 605 Morningside Drinkery on 23 May 2025.

Mema and her current band The Dopamen made up of Nathan Boston (lead guitar and backing vocals), Mitch French (bass and backing vocals) and Greg Haver (drums)appeared at the Button Factory in Auckland on 24 October 2025. Marty Duda saw her perform and gave a positive review of it, mentioning the value of her collaborating with Greg Haver.
