= Singing Back the Buffalo =

- Directed by: Tasha Hubbard
- Written by: Tasha Hubbard; Bonnie Thompson; Amethyst First Rider; Leroy Littlebear
- Produced by: Tasha Hubbard; George Hupka; Jason Ryle
- Narrated by: Tasha Hubbard; Leroy Little Bear
- Cinematography: George Hupka
- Edited by: Hans Olson
- Music by: John McMillan; Melody McKiver
- Production companies: Buffalo Song Productions; Downstream Documentary Productions
- Distributed by: Cinema Politica
- Release date: February 24, 2024 (Big Sky)
- Running time: 98 minutes
- Country: Canada
- Language: English

Singing Back the Buffalo is a Canadian documentary film, directed by Tasha Hubbard and released in 2024. The film profiles indigenous efforts to restore the buffalo to the North American plains ecosystem after the animals were driven to near extinction.

The film follows the path of the buffalo during the spring, summer and fall of 2022, across the Northern Plains of Canada and the United States.

== Production ==
In 2016, Hubbard was invited to film a historic transfer of buffalo, which were returned from Elk Island National Park to their original territory on the Blackfeet Reservation in Montana. However, she put the project on pause following the controversial death of Colten Boushie, and turned her attention to making Nîpawistamâsowin: We Will Stand Up, her film about the Boushie incident which was released in 2019.

Hubbard was then approached to make other films about similar incidents of anti-indigenous violence, but returned to Singing Back the Buffalo after being convinced by her family that she needed to take a break from telling difficult stories and make a film that brought her joy. She resumed production on the film in 2022.

== Release ==
The film premiered at the 2024 Big Sky Documentary Film Festival, and had its Canadian premiere at the 2024 Hot Docs Canadian International Documentary Festival.

A shorter edit of the film was broadcast by CBC Television in March 2025 as an episode of The Nature of Things.

== Awards ==
Year	Award	Category	Title	Result	Ref
2024	DOXA Documentary Film Festival	Nigel Moore Award	Tasha Hubbard	Honored	
2024	Calgary International Film Festival	Best Canadian Documentary	Tasha Hubbard	Honored	
2024	Calgary International Film Festival	Audience Award	Tasha Hubbard	Won	
2024	Alberta Film and Television Awards	Best Documentary Production Over 30 Minutes	Tasha Hubbard, Bonnie Thompson	Nominated	
2024	Alberta Film and Television Awards	Best Production Reflecting Cultural Diversity	Tasha Hubbard, Bonnie Thompson	Nominated	
2024	Alberta Film and Television Awards	Best Director in a Documentary Over 30 Minutes	Tasha Hubbard	Nominated	
2024	Alberta Film and Television Awards	Best Screenwriter in a Documentary Over 30 Minutes	Tasha Hubbard	Nominated	
2024	Alberta Film and Television Awards	Best Editor in a Documentary Over 30 Minutes	Hans Olson	Nominated	
2024	Alberta Film and Television Awards	Best Overall Sound in a Documentary Over 30 Minutes	Johnny Blerot	Nominated	
2024	Alberta Film and Television Awards	Best Original Music Score in a Documentary	John McMillan	Nominated	
2024	Alberta Film and Television Awards	Best Narrator in a Web Program or Series	Tasha Hubbard	Won	
2025	imagineNATIVE Film and Media Arts Festival	Alanis Obomsawin Award for Best Documentary	Tasha Hubbard	Won	
