= Seventeen (2026 film) =

2026 Canadian drama film

- Directed by: Justin Ducharme
- Written by: Justin Ducharme
- Produced by: Justin Ducharme; Olivia Marie Galosky; Tyler Hagan; Eva Thomas
- Starring: Aalayna Primrose; Nizhonniya Austin; Taio Gelinas; Kaniehtiio Horn
- Cinematography: Tucker Anderson
- Edited by: Lisa Pham Flowers
- Music by: Branton Olfert
- Production companies: Experimental Forest Films; Your Boy Productions
- Distributed by: Vortex Media
- Release date: September 14, 2026 (TIFF)
- Running time: 88 minutes
- Country: Canada
- Languages: English; Cree

Seventeen is a Canadian drama film, directed by Justin Ducharme and released in 2026. The film centres on December (Aalayna), Tamara (Nizhonniya Austin) and Aiden (Taio Gelinas), three Indigenous Canadian sex workers in Vancouver, British Columbia, whose paths intersect.

The cast also includes Kaniehtiio Horn, Shannon Baker, Ta'Kaiya Blaney, Renae Morriseau, Joel Oulette, Umar Farooq Khan, Mathias Retamal, Ray G. Thunderchild and jaye simpson in supporting roles.

== Production ==
Ducharme wrote the first draft of the screenplay in 2018, with it taking further shape after he participated in the imagineNATIVE Film and Media Arts Festival's screenwriting lap program in 2019-20. Ducharme later staged a public reading of the screenplay at Emily Carr University of Art and Design in 2024.

Casting and production were announced in May 2025, with filming taking place in Vancouver.

== Release ==
The film premiered in the Discovery program at the 2026 Toronto International Film Festival.

The film is also slated to screen in the Borsos Competition program at the 2026 Whistler Film Festival.
