= Sonia Bonspille Boileau =

Canadian filmmaker

Sonia Boileau
- Citizenship: Mohawk
- Education: Concordia University, Université du Québec à Montréal
- Notable work: Last Call Indian (2011)

Sonia Boileau is a Canadian First Nations filmmaker belonging to the Mohawk Nation of the Haudenosaunee Confederacy.

== Biography ==
Sonia Bonspille-Boileau was raised between Oka, where her French-Canadian father hails from, and Kanesatake, the community of her Mohawk mother. Her 2010 film, Last Call Indian, focuses on her personal connections to her Kanesatake, government intervention into Indigenous life, and her family's ties to the Shingwauk Indian Residential School. Boileau is bilingual, and has created, directed, and produced works in both English and French.

== Education ==
Bonspille-Boileau has received an extensive and well-rounded education in multiple facets of creative performance and film production. She honed her craft and acquired her first degree in dramatic arts from College Lionel Groulx. Shortly thereafter, she attended the Université de Montreal securing a minor in film studies.

From here, she continued to round out her knowledge of film production at the New York Film Academy at La Femis, scenography studies at Université de Quebec a Montreal and a bachelor's degree in film production at Concordia University.

== Career ==
Boileau's debut feature, Le Dep, was shot for under $250,000 from a grant provided by Telefilm Canada. The movie premiered at the 2015 Karlovy Vary International Film Festival.

Boileau also took part in the 2016 Native Slam, working with Mike Jonathan, a Rotorua filmmaker, and Jeremiah Tauamiti.

In 2017 she wrote and directed a short film called We'll Always Have Toynbee with Cheri Maracle and David Julian Hirsh which won Best Live Short at the 2018 American Indian Film Festival.

Her sophomore feature film Rustic Oracle, starring Carmen Moore, Lake Delisle and Kevin Parent. premiered at the 2019 Vancouver International Film Festival. Carmen Moore won Best Supporting Actress and Lake Delisle won Best Lead Actress at the 2019 American Indian Film Festival.

Film	Year
Last Call Indian	2010
Mouki	2010-2012
8th Fire	2012
Le Dep	2015
The Oka Legacy	2015
Ra'saste	2016
Wapikoni	2017
We'll Always Have Toynbee	2018
Rustic Oracle	2019

== Accolades ==
In 2017, Boileau won the Women in the Director's Chair (WIDC) Feature Film Award. The funding from this award will support Boileau's work on her film Rustic Oracle. Boileau's Rustic Oracle project has also been invested in by Telefilm Canada.

Boileau was awarded an Honourable Mention in the BC Spotlight and Canadian Images Awards for her feature film Le Dep for "telling the story of a whole community within one small, detailed space." Le Dep premiered at VIFF 2015, and was also screened at the Karlovy Vary International Film Festival 2015, imagineNative 2015, Montreal's First Peoples Film Festival 2015, the 2015 Raindance Film Festival, and received awards for best actress at the 2015 American Indian Film Festival and best narrative feature at the Santa Fe Independent Film Festival in 2016.

Boileau's 2010 documentary Last Call Indian received a nomination for best feature-length documentary at the 2011 Gemini Awards, was nominated for best point-of-view documentary at the 2011 Yorkton Film Festival, was nominated for best music in a documentary and won the Diversity Prize both at the Gala des Prix Gémeaux in 2011.

Mouki, Boileau's French language children's series, was nominated for the best French children's program at the Rockie Awards, part of the 2011 Banff World Media Festival.
