= Stellar (film) =

2022 Canadian film directed by Darlene Naponse

- Film poster
- Directed by: Darlene Naponse
- Written by: Darlene Naponse
- Produced by: Paula Devonshire; Darlene Naponse; Jennifer Weiss
- Starring: Elle-Máijá Tailfeathers; Braeden Clarke
- Cinematography: Mathieu Seguin
- Edited by: Jose Marianne Proulx; David Wharnsby
- Release date: September 12, 2022 (TIFF)
- Running time: 87 minutes
- Country: Canada
- Language: English

Stellar is a 2022 Canadian romantic drama film, written, produced, and directed by Darlene Naponse. The film stars Braeden Clarke and Elle-Máijá Tailfeathers as an indigenous man and woman who meet and initiate a romantic relationship, setting off a cosmic chain of events that may save the world from destruction.

The film entered production in 2021 on the territory of the Atikameksheng Anishnawbek First Nation near Sudbury, Ontario. Its cast also includes Rossif Sutherland, K. C. Collins, Billy Merasty, Tina Keeper and R. H. Thomson.

The film premiered in the Contemporary World Cinema program at the Toronto International Film Festival on September 12, 2022. It was subsequently selected as the opening film of the 2022 imagineNATIVE Film and Media Arts Festival.

== Reception ==
On the review aggregator website Rotten Tomatoes, 86% of seven critics' reviews are positive, with an average rating of 6.5/10.
