= Lori Lozinski =

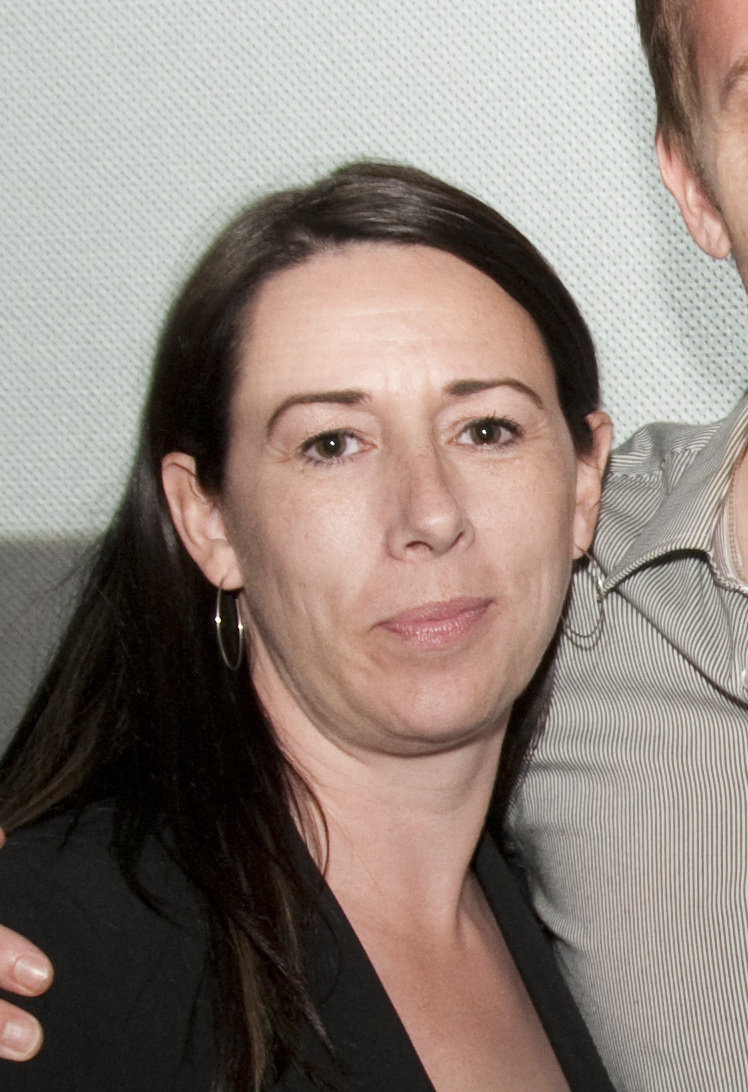
Lori Lozinski at the 2011 SDF Premiere

Lori Lozinski is a Canadian film and television producer from Vancouver, British Columbia, who is the head of the Violator Films studio.

== Filmography ==
=== Film ===
- My Old Man - 2004
- The Score - 2005
- Dirty Dog - 2006
- The Flying Lion - 2007
- Shorts in Motion: The Art of Seduction - 2007
- Sheltered Life - 2008
- Savage - 2009
- Parkdale - 2011
- Hungry Heart - 2014
- Rebel (Bihttoš) - 2014
- Intemperance - 2014
- Business Ethics - 2015
- The Embargo Project - 2015
- Never Steady, Never Still - 2017
- Once There Was a Winter - 2017
- The Body Remembers When the World Broke Open - 2019
- When I'm a Moth - 2019
- The Pilgrimage - 2020
- Sugar Daddy - 2020
- Kímmapiiyipitssini: The Meaning of Empathy - 2021
- Hatha - 2021
- Things We Feel But Do Not Say - 2021
- A Motorcycle Saved My Life - 2022
- With Love and a Major Organ - 2023
- Winner - 2024

=== Television ===
- The Art of Seduction - 2006
- Luna: Spirit of the Whale - 2007
- Pucca - 2008
- Eat St. - 2011
- Packages from Planet X - 2013–14
- Scout and the Gumboot Kids - 2015
- Space Suite II - 2016
- Little Bird - 2023

== Awards ==
Award	Year	Category	Work	Result	Ref(s)
Genie Awards	2011	Best Live Action Short Drama	Savage with Lisa Jackson, Lauren Grant	Won	
Canadian Screen Awards	2017	Best Pre-School Program or Series	Scout and the Gumboot Kids	Nominated	
Canadian Screen Awards	2020	Best Motion Picture	The Body Remembers When the World Broke Open with Tyler Hagan	Nominated	
Canadian Screen Awards	2022	Best Feature Length Documentary	Kímmapiiyipitssini: The Meaning of Empathy with Elle-Máijá Tailfeathers, David Christensen	Won	
Canadian Screen Awards	2024	Best Dramatic Series	Little Bird with Jennifer Podemski, Hannah Matty Moscovitch, Christina Fon, Ernest Webb, Catherine Bainbridge, Linda Ludwick, Kim Todd, Nicholas Hirst, Zoe Leigh Hopkins, Elle-Máijá Tailfeathers, Jeremy Podeswa, Christian Vesper, Dante Di Loreto, Tanya Brunel, Jessica Dunn, Claire MacKinnon, Philippe Chabot, Ellen Rutter	Won	
