= Nikamowin (Song) =

2007 Canadian short film

- Directed by: Kevin Lee Burton
- Written by: Kevin Lee Burton
- Cinematography: Helen Haig-Brown
- Production company: Indigenous Media Arts Group
- Distributed by: vTape
- Release date: October 20, 2007
- Running time: 12 minutes
- Country: Canada
- Languages: English; Cree

Nikamowin (Song) is a Canadian short documentary film, directed by Kevin Lee Burton and released in 2007. A meditation on the importance of language in defining personal identity, the film opens with a brief English language conversation in which one man asks another one why he cannot speak Cree, before transitioning into Cree language dialogue sampled and looped back to create a beatboxing track; it is visually accompanied by footage from both Vancouver and Burton's hometown of Gods Lake Narrows, similarly looped back and edited to suggest repeated back and forth travel between the urban and rural worlds.

The film premiered at the 2007 imagineNATIVE Film and Media Arts Festival, where it won the award for Best Indigenous Language Production and the Kent Monkman Award for Best Experimental/Innovation in Storytelling. It was subsequently screened at the 2008 Sundance Film Festival, and as the opening film to some commercial screenings of Shane Belcourt's feature film Tkaronto in 2008.

The film was named to the Toronto International Film Festival's annual year-end Canada's Top Ten list for 2008.

It was later included in various exhibitions of indigenous North American art, including Shapeshifting: Transformations in Native American Art at the Peabody Essex Museum in 2012, and the touring Beat Nation: Art, Hip Hop and Aboriginal Culture in 2013.
