= Biidaaban: First Light =

- Directed by: Lisa Jackson
- Written by: Lisa Jackson
- Produced by: Lisa Jackson
- Cinematography: Mathew Borrett (3D artist)
- Production companies: National Film Board of Canada digital studio Jam3
- Release date: 2018
- Country: Canada
- Languages: Wendat, Mohawk, Ojibwe

Biidaban: First Light is a Canadian immersive virtual reality film, created by Lisa Jackson and released in 2018. The film places viewers in an immersive vision of a Downtown Toronto that has been reclaimed by nature, with vegetation and animals living freely inside the urban landscape, with narration in the indigenous Wendat, Mohawk and Ojibwe languages.

Jackson has indicated that the film is not meant to be perceived as apocalyptic, but as a meditation on the importance of humans living in harmony with nature to build a positive future. She created the film in conjunction with 3D artist Mathew Borrett, digital production agency Jam3 and the digital studio of the National Film Board of Canada.

The film premiered at the Tribeca Film Festival in April 2018. It received a special event screening at Nathan Phillips Square in September, before having its official Canadian premiere at the imagineNATIVE Film and Media Arts Festival.

== Awards ==
At imagineNATIVE, the film won the award for Best Interactive Work. It won the Canadian Screen Award for Best Immersive Experience, Fiction at the 7th Canadian Screen Awards in 2019.
