= January Rogers =

First Nations poet and artist in Canada

- Born: Janet Marie Rogers; 1963 (age 62–63); Vancouver, British Columbia
- Occupations: poet, artist, author, publisher
- Writing career
- Language: English
- Genres: poetry, spoken word
- Notable awards: American Indian Film Festival best music video award (2020)

January Rogers (born 1963) is a First Nations Mohawk/Tuscarora writer from the Six Nations in Ontario. Her work includes poetry and spoken-word performance poetry.

== Early life ==
Janet Marie Rogers was born in Vancouver. She moved to Victoria on Vancouver Island in 1994.

== Career ==
First working as a visual artist, she began writing in 1996. Rogers moved to the Six Nations reserve in June 2019, where she founded Ojistoh Publishing and launched a Six Nations Inaugural Literary Award (SNILA).

Rogers has hosted the radio programs Native Waves Radio on CFUV and Tribal Clefs on CBC Radio One Victoria. She produced the radio documentaries Bring Your Drum: 50 Years of Indigenous Protest Music Resonating Reconciliation, which received awards for Best Radio at the imagineNATIVE Film + Media Arts Festival. She produced a 6-part radio documentary titled NDNs on the Airwaves 2016 and a short doc of the same title with her media team 2Ro Media.

From January 2012 to November 2014, Rogers was City of Victoria's Poet Laureate. In 2015, she was named writer in residence for the University of Northern British Columbia. In September 2018, Rogers began a year-long writer in residence position at the University of Alberta.

Rogers formed the collective Ikkwenyes (Dare to Do) with Mohawk poet Alex Jacobs. The collective has received a Collaborative Exchange Award from the Canada Council for the Arts and a Loft Literary Fellowship prize from The Loft Literary Center.

From September 2022 to April 2023, Rogers was Western University in London ON's 50th Writer-In-Residence, a position shared with London Public Library, where she mentored both students and writers in the general community alike.

== Published works ==
=== Poetry ===
- Splitting the Heart (2007), Ekstasis Editions
- Red Erotic (2010), Ojistoh Publishing
- Unearthed (2011) Leaf Press
- Peace in Duress (2014), Talon Books
- Totem Poles and Railroads (2016) ARP Books
- As Long as the Sun Shines (2018) Bookland Press, Mohawk edition translated by Jeremy Green (2019)
- “Ego of a Nation” (2021) Ojistoh Publishing
- "The State of Indigeneity 2022" (2024) F(r)iction Magazine (written under the name "January Rogers")

=== Recordings ===
- Firewater (2009)
- Got Your Back (2012)
- 6 Directions (2013)
- As Long As the Sun Shines (2018) companion recording on reverbnation

== Awards ==
In 2020, the American Indian Film Festival gave Rogers' “Ego of a Nation" the best music video award. Rogers has been nominated in the category Best Spoken Word Recording at the Canadian Aboriginal Music Awards, the Aboriginal Peoples Choice Music Awards and the Native American Music Awards. She has also been featured at the Vancouver Youth Poetry Slam, where she performed her spoken word poem "Opposite Directions" in 2013.
