= Savage (2009 Canadian film) =

- Directed by: Lisa Jackson
- Written by: Lisa Jackson
- Produced by: Lauren Grant; Lori Lozinski
- Starring: Ta'Kaiya Blaney; Skeena Reece
- Cinematography: Robert Aschmann
- Edited by: Hart Snider; Brendan Woollard
- Music by: Rodrigo Caballero
- Production companies: Clique Pictures; Violator Films
- Distributed by: Ouat Media
- Release date: October 17, 2009 (ImagineNATIVE)
- Running time: 6 minutes
- Country: Canada
- Language: English

Savage is a 2009 Canadian short drama film written and directed by Lisa Jackson. It stars Ta'Kaiya Blaney and Skeena Reece.

== Plot ==
The film depicts a Cree woman crying and singing a sad traditional song while a young girl is transported to a residential school, though it is left deliberately ambiguous whether the woman is the child's mother or the child herself reflecting on her past as an adult. The conventional narrative of residential schools is subverted when the children perform a hip hop group dance routine after the teacher leaves the room.

== Release ==
The film premiered at the ImagineNATIVE Film + Media Arts Festival on October 17, 2009. It was later screened at the 31st Genie Awards, where it won the Genie Award for Best Live Action Short Drama.
