= For Angela =

- Directed by: Daniel Prouty, Nancy Trites Botkin
- Written by: Daniel Prouty
- Produced by: Nancy Trites Botkin, Joe MacDonald
- Starring: Tina Keeper Tiffany Peters
- Cinematography: Charles Lavack
- Edited by: Kelly Saxberg
- Music by: Norman Dugas
- Production company: National Film Board of Canada
- Release date: 1993
- Running time: 21:20
- Country: Canada
- Language: English

For Angela is a 1993 short docudrama co-directed by Daniel Prouty and Nancy Trites Botkin, dramatizing the experiences of two Indigenous women, Rhonda Gordon and her daughter Angela, who were the victims of racist harassment on a Winnipeg city bus.

The two were verbally assaulted by three teenage boys at a bus stop, with the boys then continuing their racist insults aboard the bus. The following day Gordon went to the boys' school, met the principal, and confronted the offenders. The confrontation was meant to educate the boys - to challenge their stereotypes of natives and to sensitize them to the dehumanizing effects of their behavior.

For Angela stars Tina Keeper as Rhonda Gordon. Produced by the National Film Board of Canada, the film received several awards including the Canada Award at the 1995 Gemini Awards, and the award for Best Live Short Subject at the American Indian Film Festival.
