= Aki (film) =

- Directed by: Darlene Naponse
- Screenplay by: Darlene Naponse
- Produced by: Darlene Naponse; Jamie Manning
- Cinematography: Ryan Mariotti; Mathieu Seguin; Darlene Naponse
- Edited by: Darlene Naponse
- Music by: Cris Derksen
- Production companies: Baswewe Films; Night Market
- Release date: September 9, 2025 (TIFF)
- Running time: 83 minutes
- Country: Canada
- Language: Anishinaabemowin

Aki is a Canadian documentary film, directed by Darlene Naponse and released in 2025. The film is a portrait of changing seasonal life, both in the natural world and in the culture of the community, in Naponse's home community of Atikameksheng Anishnawbek, an Ojibwe reserve near Sudbury, Ontario.

The film also includes some contrast between the natural environment of Atikameksheng, and the surrounding industrial development in Sudbury.

The film premiered at the 2025 Toronto International Film Festival, and subsequently had a gala screening at the 2025 Cinéfest Sudbury International Film Festival.

== Critical response ==
Rachel Ho of Point of View wrote that "Aki emphasizes nature’s expansiveness: many of the trees, lakes, and fields existed well before our lifetime and will continue to exist when we’ve long gone. No matter how imposing our existence and actions are to the land, we merely exist as its caretakers. But as caretakers, we have been given the gift of life, family, joy, and community — the other side of Naponse’s film."

== Awards ==
The film won the Sun Jury Award at the 2026 ImagineNATIVE Film and Media Arts Festival.
