= Nigel Moore Award for Youth Programming =

Annual Canadian film award

The Nigel Moore Award for Youth Programming is an annual Canadian film award, presented to honour the best documentary film of interest to youth audiences screened at that year's DOXA Documentary Film Festival. The award frequently, but not always, presents an honorable mention in addition to the overall winner.

== Winners ==
Year	Film	Filmmaker(s)	Ref
2013	The Great Hip Hop Hoax	Jeanie Finlay	
2014	Damnation	Travis Rummel, Ben Knight, Matt Stoecker	
2014	Resolute	Daniel Roher	
2015	After the Last River	Victoria Lean	
2015	How to Change the World	Jerry Rothwell	
2016	We Call Them Intruders	Tamara Herman, Susi Porter-Bopp	
2016	Reserve 107	Brad Leitch	
2017	Swagger	Olivier Babinet	
2017	The Caretakers	David Goldberg	
2018	Minding the Gap	Bing Liu	
2018	Butterfly Monument	Jules Koostachin, Rick Miller	
2019	Call Me Intern	Nathalie Berger, Leo David Hyde	
2020	Award not presented		
2021	What About Our Future?	Jamie Leigh Gianpoulos, Cláudio Cruz	
2022	Hello World	Kenneth Elvebakk	
2023	King Coal	Elaine McMillion Sheldon	
2023	We Will Not Fade Away	Alisa Kovalenko	
2024	Red Fever	Neil Diamond, Catherine Bainbridge	
2024	Singing Back the Buffalo	Tasha Hubbard	
2025	They Are Sacred	Kim O'Bomsawin	
2026	Illustrated Legacies: Graveyard of the Pacific	Tanner Zurkoski	
2026	Replica	Chouwa Liang	
