= Meadowlarks (film) =

2025 Canadian drama film

- Theatrical release poster
- Directed by: Tasha Hubbard
- Written by: Tasha Hubbard; Emil Sher
- Produced by: Tyler Hagan; Julia Rosenberg
- Starring: Michael Greyeyes; Carmen Moore; Alex Rice; Michelle Thrush
- Cinematography: James Klopko
- Edited by: Simone Smith
- Production companies: January Media; Experimental Forest Films
- Distributed by: Mongrel Media
- Release date: September 7, 2025 (TIFF)
- Running time: 92 minutes
- Country: Canada
- Languages: English; French; Cree; Flemish

Meadowlarks is a Canadian drama film, directed by Tasha Hubbard and released in 2025. It stars Michael Greyeyes, Carmen Moore, Alex Rice, Michelle Thrush and Lorne Duquette as five Cree siblings who were separated by the Sixties Scoop, who are meeting for the first time as adults.

== Production ==
Hubbard's scripted narrative filmmaking debut following numerous documentary films, it is based in part on her 2017 film Birth of a Family. It originally also had the working title Birth of a Family.

The film was shot in fall 2024 in Golden, British Columbia, and Banff and Calgary, Alberta.

== Release ==
The film premiered at the 2025 Toronto International Film Festival on September 7, 2025.

It was subsequently screened at the 2025 Vancouver International Film Festival, where it won the Audience Award for the Panorama program.

== Critical response ==
Matthew Simpson of That Shelf wrote that "in many ways, Meadowlarks feels like a play. There are a few locations, and lots of dialogue, but that is perhaps the point. These are stories that need to be shared, that we need to hear, based on the real-life experiences of people to whom this happened. Giving them space to do just that is a part of healing. Be it in documentary form, like Hubbard’s Birth of a Family, upon which this film is based, or here in Meadowlarks. These stories remind us that these events didn’t happen in the abstract, or in isolation, and the choice to dramatize these conversations in the present instead of re-enacting them in a period-set film helps remind us that we as a nation are still grappling with our troubled legacy."
