= Birth of a Family =

- Directed by: Tasha Hubbard
- Written by: Tasha Hubbard, Betty Ann Adam
- Production company: National Film Board of Canada
- Release date: May 2, 2017 (Canada)

Birth of a Family is a 2017 First Nations Canadian documentary directed by Tasha Hubbard and co-written by Hubbard and Betty Ann Adam. It follows three sisters and a brother, adopted as infants into separate families across North America, who meet together for the first time.

== Summary ==
The reunion emerged from decades of searching by Betty Ann Adam, the eldest of the family. Removed from their young Dene mother's care as part of Canada's infamous Sixties Scoop, Betty Ann, Esther, Rosalie and Ben were four of the 20,000 Indigenous children taken from their families between 1955 and 1985, to be either adopted into white families or to live in foster care. The documentary follows the siblings as they reunite in Banff, Alberta. As the four siblings piece together their shared history, their connection deepens, bringing laughter with it, and their family begins to take shape.

== Filming process ==
In 2014, Betty Ann Adam, a reporter at The StarPhoenix, approached Hubbard about documenting her planned reunion and her intentions to direct the project.

Hubbard pitched the idea to the National Film Board (NFB) and the response was immediately supportive. However, the NFB made it a condition that Hubbard be director. Adam agreed in order to be more emotionally and physically present for the upcoming reunion. In an article for The StarPhoenix, she emphasised the importance of having a director who had a similar lived experience of forced removal and adoption into a non-Indigenous family during the Sixties Scoop. Adam said, "It was perfect to have a director who had that same experience in her lived experience. We knew that would inform her approach toward the story, that she would understand certain things about what we were going through." This responsibility for holding space and minimal interference was central to the filming.

Despite the circumstances of the reunion taking place in a small cabin and it being a two-camera shoot, Adam says Hubbard was able to shoot the film without distracting the family from the connections they were there to make. "For us, things probably went as smoothly as they could. I think that's because she was taking care of things behind the scenes so they didn't interfere with our experience," Adam says.

== Reception ==
Reception of the documentary has been positive. It has featured in many festivals including the 2017 Talking Stick Festival, Edmonton International Film Festival, and the Toronto International Film Festival.

Patrick Mullen of Point of View reviews the film as "relevatory" and "a family reunion doc like you've never seen." Gateway Online calls this film a "triumph," writing in their review, "Birth of a Family reminds viewers of a painful past that many First Nations peoples had and continue to trudge through." Canada's documentary films festival described the film as a "raw emotion, a heart-wrenching combination of pain and joy, shown by the siblings throughout the film is as moving as anything I have seen on film. Their willingness to lay bare their experiences and feelings is inspiring, and while their story is devastating to watch it acts as a reminder of the resilience of the First Nations people who, against all odds and despite every effort to destroy them, continue to persevere."

=== Awards ===
Award body	Date	Category	Result	Ref.
Edmonton International Film Festival	October 15, 2017	Audience Award for Best Documentary Feature	Won	
imagineNATIVE Film and Media Arts Festival	October 22, 2017	Special Jury Prize – Moon Jury	Won	

== Followup ==
In 2024 Hubbard began production on a scripted narrative fiction version of the film, also with the working title Birth of a Family. Later renamed Meadowlarks, the film premiered at the 2025 Toronto International Film Festival.
