= ImagineNATIVE Film and Media Arts Festival =

Indigenous film festival in Toronto

imagineNATIVE Film and Media Arts Festival
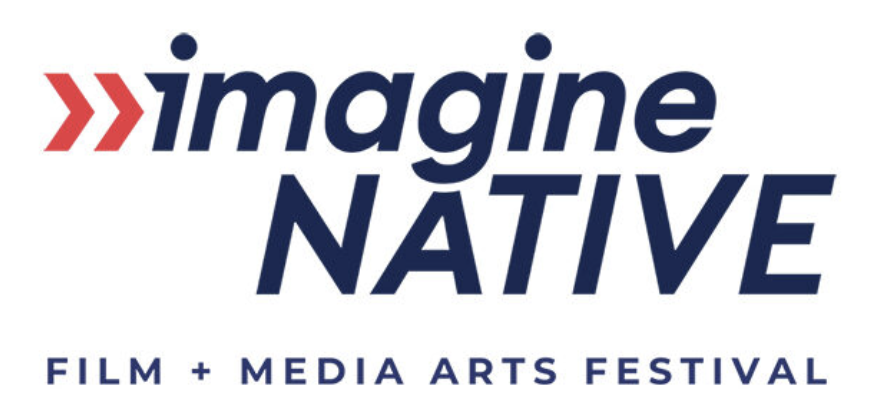
- Status: Active
- Genre: Film festival
- Locations: Toronto, Ontario
- Country: Canada
- Inaugurated: 1998; 28 years ago
- Most recent: June 3–8, 2025 (in Toronto); June 9–15, 2025 (online)
- Website: imaginenative.org

The imagineNATIVE Film + Media Arts Festival is the world's largest Indigenous-focused film and media arts festival, held annually in Toronto. The festival focuses on the film, video, radio, and new media work of Indigenous, Aboriginal and First Peoples from around the world. The festival includes screenings, parties, panel discussions, and cultural events.

As an organization, imagineNATIVE supports the creation of new works through their commissioning program, and national outreach to and for Indigenous communities through various off-site programs throughout the year. imagineNATIVE also commissions industry reports on the status of Indigenous film production in Canada.

Held in October each year for most of its history, in February 2024 the festival announced that it would not be held that year, and will shift to June in 2025.

== History ==
The festival was founded in 1998 by Cynthia Lickers-Sage in her capacity as the Aboriginal outreach coordinator for Vtape as a venue for the exhibition of short film and video work by Aboriginal artists. While initially operated through Vtape, the festival subsequently became an independent organization. An early programmer for the festival was Ojibway critic and journalist Jesse Wente, who continued in his role as programmer through 2010. In 2010, Jason Ryle took on the role of the festival's executive director; he was succeeded in 2020 by Naomi Johnson. Ryle was subsequently named the winner of the Toronto Film Critics Association's Clyde Gilmour Award for his contributions to the Canadian film industry, and joined the Toronto International Film Festival as lead programmer for Indigenous films.

In May 2023, Lindsay Monture was named the new festival director.

== Awards ==
The 2001 winner for Best Film went to Atanarjuat: The Fast Runner by Inuk filmmaker Zacharias Kunuk. This film was the first feature dramatic film in an Indigenous language by an Inuk director.

The 2016 festival focused on Inuit and northern films, with a special focus on films from Greenland. Award winners for that year included Bonfire, a film by Russian Sakha director Dmitry Davydov, for Best Dramatic Feature; Searchers (Maliglutit) by Zacharias Kunuk for Best Indigenous Language Production; and Angry Inuk, directed by Alethea Arnaquq-Baril, which won Best Documentary Feature.

=== Audience Choice Award ===
Year	Film	Director	Ref
2019	nîpawistamâsowin: We Will Stand Up	Tasha Hubbard	
2020	Brother, I Cry	Jessie Anthony	
2021	Run Woman Run	Zoe Leigh Hopkins	
2022	Rosie	Gail Maurice	
2023	Café Daughter	Shelley Niro	

=== Best Dramatic Feature ===
Year	Film	Director	Ref
2001	Atanarjuat: The Fast Runner	Zacharias Kunuk	
2002			
2003	The Doe Boy	Randy Redroad	
2004	The Land Has Eyes (Pear ta ma ʻon maf)	Vilsoni Hereniko	
2005	The Blossoming of Maximo Oliveros (Ang Pagdadalaga ni Maximo Oliveros)	Auraeus Solito	
2006	The Journals of Knud Rasmussen	Zacharias Kunuk, Norman Cohn	
2007	Four Sheets to the Wind	Sterlin Harjo	
2008	Before Tomorrow (Le jour avant le lendemain)	Marie-Hélène Cousineau, Madeline Ivalu	
2009	The Wind and the Water (Burwa dii ebo)	Vero Bollow	
2010	Boy	Taika Waititi	
2011	Here I Am	Beck Cole	
2012	Charlie Zone	Hank White	
2013	Satellite Boy	Catriona McKenzie	
2014	A White Day (Yryn kyn)	Mikhail Lukachevskiy	
2015	Mekko	Sterlin Harjo	
2016	Bonfire	Dmitrii Davydov	
2017	Sweet Country	Warwick Thornton	
2018	The Lord Eagle (Toyon Kyyl)	Eduard Novikov	
2019	The Body Remembers When the World Broke Open	Kathleen Hepburn, Elle-Máijá Tailfeathers	
2020	The Legend of Baron To’a	Kiel McNaughton	
2021	Bootlegger	Caroline Monnet	
2022	We Are Still Here	Beck Cole, Dena Curtis, Tracey Rigney, Danielle MacLean, Tim Worrall, Renae Maihi, Miki Magasiva, Mario Gaoa, Richard Curtis, Chantelle Burgoyne	
2023	Hey, Viktor!	Cody Lightning	
2025	We Were Dangerous	Josephine Stewart-Te Whiu	
2026	Mārama	Taratoa Stappard	

=== Best Short Drama ===
Year	Film	Director	Ref
2000			
2001			
2002			
2003	Moccasin Flats	Randy Redroad	
2004	Memory	Cedar Sherbert	
2005	There's No 'I' in Hockey	Dennis Jackson	
2006	Hawaikii	Mike Jonathan	
2007	Shooting Geronimo	Kent Monkman	
2008	Sikumi (On the Ice)	Andrew Okpeaha MacLean	
2009	Tungijuq	Zacharias Kunuk	
2010	Redemption	Katie Wolfe	
2011	Salar	Nicholas Greene	
2012	Throat Song	Miranda de Pencier	
2013	Abalone	Tracey Rigney	
2014	The Underground	Michelle Latimer	
2015	Stoerre Vaerie (Northern Great Mountain)	Amanda Kernell	
2016	UFO	Gregory King	

=== Best Canadian Short Drama (2006–2016) ===
Year	Film	Director	Ref
2006	133 Skyway	Randy Redroad	
2007	The Colony	Jeff Barnaby	
2008	A Small Thing	Adam Garnet Jones	
2009	Shi-Shi-Etko	Marilyn Thomas	
2010	Lumaajuuq	Alethea Arnaquq-Baril	
2011	Amaqqut Nunaat (The Country of Wolves)	Neil Christopher	
2012	A Red Girl's Reasoning	Elle-Máijá Tailfeathers	
2013	Mohawk Midnight Runners	Zoe Hopkins	
2014	Indigo	Amanda Strong	
2015	Clouds of Autumn	Trevor Mack	
2016	God's Acre	Kelton Stepanowich	

=== Best Short Work (Cynthia Lickers-Sage Award, 2017–Present) ===
Year	Film	Director	Ref
2017	I Will Always Love You Kingen	Amanda Kernell	
2018	Biidaaban (The Dawn Comes)	Amanda Strong	
2019	Moloka’i Bound	Alika Maikau	
2020	Njuokčamat (The Tongues)	Marja Bål Nango and Ingir Bål Nango	
2021	Angakusajaujuq: The Shaman's Apprentice	Zacharias Kunuk	
2022			
2023	Nigiqtuq (The South Wind)	Lindsay McIntyre	
2025	Rapido	Richard J. Curtis	

=== Best Indigenous Language Production ===
Year	Film	Director	Ref
2007	Nikamowin (Song)	Kevin Lee Burton	
2008	L'Amendement	Kevin Papatie	
2009	The Wind and the Water (Burwa Dii Ebo)	Vero Bollow; Igar Yala Collective	
2010	File Under Miscellaneous	Jeff Barnaby	
2011	Samson & Delilah	Warwick Thornton	
2012	Throat Song	Miranda de Pencier	
2013	The Script (Baybayin)	Kanakan Balintagos	
2014	This May Be the Last Time	Sterlin Harjo	
2015	Bulunu Milkarri	Sylvia Nulpinditj	
2016	Searchers (Maliglutit)	Zacharias Kunuk; Natar Ungalaaq	
2017	Bowhead Whale Hunting With My Ancestors	Carol Kunnuk, Zacharias Kunuk	
2018	Eternity (Wiñaypacha)	Oscar Catacora	
2019	The Book of the Sea	Aleksei Vakhrushev	
2020	Kapaemahu	Hinaleimoana Wong-Kalu	
2021	Matuna, la sombra del Guerrero	Rafael Roberto Mojica Gil	
2022	Məca	Ritchie Norman Hemphill	
2023	The Bull of Cold	Alexander Moruo	
2025	The Legends of Eternal Snow (Khaar Kuyaar Nomokhtoro)	Aleksei Romanov	

=== Kent Monkman Award: Best Experimental/Innovation in Storytelling ===
Year	Film	Director	Ref
2000			
2001			
2002			
2003	Thorn Grass	Robin Hammer	
2004	Wagon Burner	Terrance Houle	
2005	My Big Brother (Su naa)	Helen Haig-Brown	
2006	Women in Canada: A Trilogy	Marnie Parrell	
2007	Nikamowin (Song)	Kevin Lee Burton	
2008	Tsu Heidei Shugaxtutaan 1	Nicholas Galanin	
2009	Horse	Archer Pechawis	
2010	Burnt	Alejandro Valbuena	
2011	The Gift	Terril Calder	
2012	Her Silent Life	Lindsay McIntyre	
2013	He Who Dreams	Dana Claxton	
2014	Covered	Tara (Beier) Browne	
2015	Tai Whetuki - House of Death	Lisa Reihana	
2016	Dolastallat	Marja Helander	
2017	Three Thousand	Asinnajaq	
2018	Birds in the Earth (Eatnanvuloš Lottit)	Marja Helander	
2019	The Creation of the World (Hant Quij Cöipaxi Hac)	Antonio Coello	
2020	Suodji (Shelter)	Marja Helander	
2021	Puisi	Pilutaq Lundblad	
2022	The Original Shareholder Experience	Petyr Xyst	
2023	Aykuo	Ayaal Adamov	
2025	Confluence	Charlene Moore, ODMK	

=== Best Documentary - Short Format ===
Year	Film	Director	Ref
2005	Wirriya (Small Boy)	Beck Cole	
2006	Coureurs de nuit	Shanouk Newashish	
2007	The Vanishing Trace	Keesic Douglas	
2008	Le rêve d'une mère	Cherilyn Papatie	
2009	How People Got Fire	Daniel Janke	
2010	Do Not Tell (Ne le dis pas / Nika tshika uiten mishkut)	Jani Bellefleur-Kaltush	
2011	Spirit of the Bluebird	Jesse Gouchey, Xstine Cook	
2012	Songline to Happiness	Danny Teece-Johnson	
2013	Inuit Cree Reconciliation	Neil Diamond, Zacharias Kunuk	
2014	Treading Water	Janelle Wookey, Jérémie Wookey	
2015	Nowhere Land	Bonnie Ammaq	
2016	Cree Code Talker	Alexandra Lazarowich	
2017	Lelum'	Asia Youngman	
2018	Fast Horse	Alexandra Lazarowich	
2019	The Boxers of Brule	Jesse Adler	
2020	êmîcêtôcêt: Many Bloodlines	Theola Ross	
2021	Mary Two-Axe Earley: I Am Indian Again	Courtney Montour	
2022	First Time Home	Noemi Librado-Sanchez, Esmirna Librado, Esmeralda Ventura, Heriberto Ventura	
2023	Grape Soda in the Parking Lot	Megan Kyak-Monteith, Taqralik Partridge	
2025	In My Hand	Marja Helander, Liselotte Wajstedt	

=== Best Documentary - Long Format (Alanis Obomsawin Award) ===
Year	Film	Director	Ref
2000			
2001			
2002			
2003	Totem: The Return of the G'psgolox Pole	Gil Cardinal	
2004	The Ghost Riders	V. Blackhawk Aamodt	
2005	Mohawk Girls	Tracey Deer	
2006	Waban-aki: People from Where the Sun Rises	Alanis Obomsawin	
2007	Water Flowing Together	Gwendolen Cates	
2008	March Point	Cody Cayou, Nick Clark, Tracy Rector, Annie Silverstein, Travis Tom	
2009	C.B.Q.M.	Dennis Allen	
2010	And the River Flows On (Y el rio sigue corriendo)	Carlos Pérez Rojas	
2011	The Tall Man	Tony Krawitz	
2012	My Louisiana Love	Monique Verdi	
2013	Who Will Be A Gurkha?	Kesang Tseten	
2014	My Legacy	Helen Haig-Brown	
2015	The Price of Peace	Kim Webby	
2016	Angry Inuk	Alethea Arnaquq-Baril	
2017	Indictment: The Crimes of Shelly Chartier	Shane Belcourt, Lisa Jackson	
2018	Marks of Mana	Lisa Taouma	
2019	Mothers of the Land (Sembradoras de vida)	Alvaro Sarmiento, Diego Sarmiento	
2020	Compañía	Miguel Hilari	
2021	Warrior Spirit	Landon Dyksterhouse	
2022	Šaamšiǩ – Great Grandmothers Hat	Anstein Mikkelsen, Harry Johansen	
2023	Mama	Xun Sero	
2025	Singing Back the Buffalo	Tasha Hubbard	

=== After Dark Award ===
Award for speculative fiction films in memory of Jeff Barnaby.

Year	Film	Director	Ref
2025	Seeds	Kaniehtiio Horn	
2026	Klee	Gavin Baird	

=== Best Music Video (2000–2016) ===
Year	Title	Director
2000		
2001		
2002		
2003	Music is the Medicine	Randy Redroad
2004	Slangblossom: Possibly	Daybi Slangblossom
2005	Tamara Podemski: Meegwetch	Bruce McDonald
2006	The Dust Dive: A Minor Disturbance	Blackhorse Lowe
2007	Punassiun	Spencer St-Onge Francis Grégoire Carl Grégoire Jean-Christophe Gabriel James Chescappin Marco Bentz Jonathan Germain Wendy Germain Nicolas Paradis Jean Philippe Robertson
2008	Warrk Warrk	Tommy Lewis Julia Morris
2009	Ariana Tikao: Tuia (Stitched)	Louise Potiki Bryant
2010	Haunted	Shane Ghostkeeper
2011	I Lost My Shadow	Nanobah Becker
2012	Sides	Mosha Folger
2013	Row	Houston R. Cypress
2014	Haida Raid 3: Save Our Waters	Amanda Strong
2015	Nitahkôtân (I Have Arrived)	Moe Clark
2016	We Are Still Here	Sofia Jannok

=== Best Radio (2000–2013) ===
Year	Genre	Title	Director
2000			
2001			
2002			
2003		The Aboriginal Music Experience: A Radio Documentary Series	
2004		Great Indian Bus Tour	Andre Morriseau
2005		Red Album Radio Show	Richard Hunter
2006		Charles Shoots the Enemy	Native Vibes
2007		Red Moon	Dawn Dumont
2007	Documentary, Current Affairs & Talk	Good Medicine Radio Show: Tobacco Show	Rita Chretien Wanbdi Wakita
2008	Arts & Entertainment	The Plex Show	Doug Bedard
2008	Documentary, Current Affairs & Talk	ReVision Quest: "Alcohol"	Kim Ziervogel
2009		ReVision Quest	Wab Kinew
2010		ReVision Quest: "What's So Funny About Being Native?"	Kim Ziervogel
2011		Bring Your Drum	Janet Rogers
2012		Trailbreakers: Cindy Blackstock	Angela Sterritt
2013		Native Waves Radio: Resonating Reconciliation	Janet Rogers

=== Best Television (2000–2004) ===
Year	Title	Director
2000		
2001		
2002		
2003	Moccasin Flats	Stacey Stewart Curtis
2004	Kunuk Family Reunion	Zacharias Kunuk

=== Best New Media (2000–2014) ===
Year	Film	Director
2000		
2001		
2002		
2003		Daybi
2004	Fire This Time	Kokonda Dub
2005	HorizonZero Issue 17: Tell	Cheryl L'Hirondelle
2006	Wepinasowina	Cheryl L'Hirondelle
2007	An Indian Act: Shooting the Indian Act	Archer Pechawis
2008	Rabbit and Bearpaws	Chad Solomon
2009	Time Traveller	Skawennati Fragnito
2010	Otsì:! Rise of the Kanien'kehá:ka Legends	Aboriginal Territories in Cyberspace (AbTeC)
2011	God's Lake Narrows	Kevin Lee Burton
2012	Sense of Home	Leena Minifie
2013	Skahiòn:hati / Rise of the Kanien'kehá:ka Legends	Skins 3.0 Collective
2014	Uhke	Cheyenne Scott

=== Best Audio Work (since 2014) ===
Year	Film	Director
2014	The Soul of Darwin: The Centenary of the Kahlin Compound	Lorena Allam
2015	Reach For the Stars	Crystal Favel
2016	The Story She Carries	Angela Sterritt
2017	Elcrys	Michael Wilson
2018	Trans Mountain Pipeline, B.C. Wolf Cull and Dog Sled Massacre	Crystal Favel

=== Narrative Audio ===
Year	Film	Director	Ref
2025	Sous les barrages (Under the Dams): Tshishe Manikuan	Jean-Luc Kanapé	
2026	Words and Culture	Kim Wheeler	

=== Experimental Audio ===
Year	Film	Director	Ref
2025	ᎭᏫᎾᏗᏢ ᎤᏪᏴᎢ (beneath the stream)	Robbie Wing	
2026	Radiant Starlets	Alexander Jeffrey Walker	

=== Best Digital Media Work (since 2015) ===
Year	Film	Director
2015	Sky Pets	Shandiin Woodward
2016	Ch’aak’ S’aagi (Eagle Bone)	Tracy Rector
2017	Thunderbird Strike	Elizabeth LaPensée
2018	Aeasi	Amie Batalibasi

=== Best Interactive Work (since 2018) ===
Year	Film	Director	Ref
2018	Biidaaban: First Light	Lisa Jackson	

=== Digital & Interactive ===
Year	Film	Director	Ref
2025	Wilfred Buck's Star Stories	Lisa Jackson, The Macronauts	
2026	Kinship Table, la taab di li vwaazayn	Robyn Adams	

=== New Artist in Digital and Interactive ===
Year	Film	Director	Ref
2025	orange pekoe	Vanessa Racine	

=== Emerging Talent (Cynthia Lickers-Sage & Jane Glassco Awards) ===
Year	Award	Film	Director
2000	Cynthia Lickers-Sage		
2001	Cynthia Lickers-Sage		
2002	Cynthia Lickers-Sage		
2003	Cynthia Lickers-Sage		Geoffery Parenteau
2004	Cynthia Lickers-Sage	Swallow	Ariel Lightningchild
2005	Cynthia Lickers-Sage	Meskanahk (My Path)	Kevin Lee Burton
2006	Cynthia Lickers-Sage	Eggs Instead	Lena Recollet
2007	Cynthia Lickers-Sage	Fighter	Erica Lepage
2008	Cynthia Lickers-Sage	Mémere Métisse	Janelle Wookey
2009	Cynthia Lickers-Sage	Nia's Melancholy	S.F. Tusa
2010	Cynthia Lickers-Sage	Redemption	Katie Wolfe
2011	Cynthia Lickers-Sage	Amaqqut Nunnat (The Country of Wolves)	Neil Christopher
2012	Cynthia Lickers-Sage	Scar	Tiffany Parker
2013	Cynthia Lickers-Sage	El Último Consejo (The Last Council)	Itandehui Jansen
2014	Jane Glassco	Sumé - Mumisitsinerup Nipaa (Sume - The Sound of a revolution)	Inuk Silis Høegh
2014	Cynthia Lickers-Sage	Sumé - Mumisitsinerup Nipaa (Sume - The Sound of a revolution)	Inuk Silis Høegh
2015	Jane Glassco	The Routes	James McDougall
2015	Cynthia Lickers-Sage	Le Dep	Sonia Boileau
2016	Jane Glassco	Ohero:kon – Under the Husk	Katsitsionni Fox
2017	Jane Glassco	Morit Elena Morit	Inga-Wiktoria Påve Anders Sunna
2018	Jane Glassco	ANORI (Wind)	Pipaluk Kreutzmann Jorgensen

=== Best Youth (Ellen Monague Award) ===
Year	Film	Director	Ref
2010	Kurt-E: In My Blood	Kurt Filiga	
2011	The Dimming	Ippiksaut Friesen	
2012	Le Joie de vivre	Jérémy Vassiliou	
2013	Before She Came, After He Left (Før Hun Kom, Etter Han Dro)	Marja Bål Nango	
2014	#nightslikethese	Amber Midthunder, Shay Eyre, Hannah Macpherson	
2015	Lo que quiero decirte	Raquiel Palomino Ochoa	
2016	Smoke That Travels	Kayla Briët	
2017	RAE	Kawennáhere Devery Jacobs	
2018	A World of Our Own	Morningstar Derosier	
2019	The Cursed Harp	Peter Hiki	

=== New Voice in Storytelling ===
Year	Film	Director	Ref
2025	ÁHKUIN	Sunná Nousuniemi, Tuomas Kumpulainen	

=== Outstanding performance in a feature film ===
Year	Actor	Film	Ref
2025	Kaniehtiio Horn	Seeds	

=== Outstanding performance in a short film ===
Year	Actor	Film	Ref
2025	Quannah Chasinghorse	Thin Places	

=== Sun & Moon Jury Prizes ===
Year	Jury	Film	Director	Ref
2017	Sun	Sunday Fun Day	Dianna Fuemana	
2017	Moon	Birth of a Family	Tasha Hubbard	
2018	Sun	Edge of the Knife (Sgaawaay K'uuna)	Gwaai Edenshaw, Helen Haig-Brown	
2018	Moon	My Friend Michael	Ian Leaupepe, Samson Rambo	
2019	Sun	nîpawistamâsowin: We Will Stand Up	Tasha Hubbard	
2019	Moon	Ribadit	Elle Sofe Sara	
2020	Sun	Mooz Miikan	Evelyn Pakinewatik	
2020	Moon	Pilluarneq Ersigiunnaarpara	Nivi Pedersen	
2021	Sun	Hiama	Matasila Freshwater	
2021	Moon	Run Woman Run	Zoe Leigh Hopkins	
2022	Sun	Night	Ahmad Saleh	
2022	Moon	Kikino Kids	Barry Bilinsky	
2023	Sun	Tautuktavuk (What We See)	Carol Kunnuk, Lucy Tulugarjuk	
2023	Moon	Cu-Ckoo	Lindsay McIntyre	
2025	Sun	Inkwo for When the Starving Return	Amanda Strong	
2025	Moon	Anywhere (Nooj Goji)	Evelyn Pakinewatik	
2026	Sun	Aki	Darlene Naponse	
2026	Moon	The Gnawer of Rocks (Mangittatuarjuk)	Louise Flaherty	

=== August Schellenberg Award of Excellence ===
Named in memory of actor August Schellenberg, the August Schellenberg Award of Excellence is a lifetime achievement award honoring indigenous actors. The award was presented for the first time in 2015.

- 2015 - Tantoo Cardinal
- 2016 - Tom Jackson
- 2017 - Tina Keeper
- 2018 - Michael Greyeyes
- 2019 - Michelle Thrush
- 2020 - Lorne Cardinal
- 2021 - Shirley Cheechoo
- 2022 - Gary Farmer
- 2023 - Jennifer Podemski
- 2025 - Graham Greene
- 2026 - Gail Maurice

== Commissions ==
=== NFB/imagineNATIVE Interactive Partnership ===
NFB/imagineNATIVE Interactive Partnership was started in 2012 for the commissioning and production of new digital and interactive works by established Indigenous artists. Works produced through this program include De Nort (2012) by the ITWE Collective, Similkameen Crossroads (2013) by Tyler Hagan, Ice Fishing (2014) by Jordan Bennett and Red Card (2016) by Cara Mumford. Ice Fishing was subsequently selected to represent Canada at the 2015 Venice Biennale.

=== Stolen Sisters Digital Initiative ===
The Stolen Sisters Digital Initiative (SSDI) was a 2012 imagineNATIVE artistic commission and national exhibition of four, one-minute digital works by award-winning Canadian Indigenous filmmakers. The commissioned works were created to reflect and respond to the Stolen Sisters, a term adopted by the Aboriginal community and larger social justice organizations of the struggle to find answers for the hundreds of unsolved cases of missing and murdered Indigenous women across Canada. The four commissioned works were:

- Like it Was Yesterday by Calgary-based artists Jesse Gouchey and Xstine Cook
- Snare by Vancouver-based Anishinaabe artist Lisa Jackson
- When it Rains by the Métis/Chippewa Cree filmmaker Cara Mumford
- Your Courage Will Not Go Unnoticed by the Gitxsan/Lax Gibu artist and journalist Angela Sterritt

This was the first time the Festival partnered to present a simultaneous national exhibition. Working with Amnesty International Canada and Pattison Onestop, a national media company, the short videos were exhibited throughout Toronto's subway system, on display screens in 33 shopping centres across Canada, at the Calgary International Airport, and at the TIFF Bell Lightbox leading up to and during the 2012 imagineNATIVE Film + Media Arts Festival.

=== Zwei Indianer Aus Winnipeg ===
In 2009, the festival commissioned Zwei Indianer Aus Winnipeg, a short film by Saulteaux filmmaker Darryl Nepinak. The film subsequently screened at the 2009 Berlinale.

=== Embargo Collective ===
In March 2008, imagineNATIVE formed the Embargo Collective, an international group of seven Indigenous artists for the purposes of collaborating and challenging one another to create seven new films. Collective members included Helen Haig-Brown, Heiltsuk/Mohawk filmmaker and actress Zoe Leigh Hopkins and Anishnaabe filmmaker Lisa Jackson. The resulting films were subsequently screened at the 2010 Berlinale. Following this, Brown's The Cave was awarded a top-ten recognition at the Toronto International Film Festival, and was screened at the 2011 Sundance Festival, while Jackson's Savage won a 2011 Genie Award for best live action short drama.

In 2014, Embargo Collective II focused on women filmmakers. It was curated by Danis Goulet, and included Hopkins, Blackfoot/Sami filmmaker Elle-Máijá Tailfeathers, Alethea Arnaquq-Baril and Caroline Monnet. Among the films produced that year was Roberta.

== Other programs ==
=== imagineNATIVE Film + Video Tour ===
The imagineNATIVE Film + Video Tour provides regional and remote communities access to Indigenous-made film and video from Canada and abroad. In addition to bringing a Festival-favourite feature presentation to these communities, the Tour encourages youth to explore the creation of film and video through a Youth-focused film and video program, discussion and hands-on video-making workshops. The video-making workshops assist and lead youth to create and edit short videos using readily-available technology such as cellphones and webcams. The videos are featured on imagineNATIVE's website and open to public voting, sending the winner to Toronto for the imagineNATIVE Film + Media Arts Festival.

=== indigiFLIX Community Screening Series ===
The indigiFLIX Community Screening Series, presented by imagineNATIVE, is hosted in cultural and community centres to reach a broader First Nations, Métis, Inuit and non-Native audience beyond the annual Festival in Toronto. Films are selected from past imagineNATIVE Festivals in an effort to keep these important films alive and accessible to the Indigenous community. imagineNATIVE is committed to supporting artists through payment of industry-standard artist fees for all works presented.

=== Canadian Indigenous Film Producer Mini-Lab ===
The Canadian Indigenous Film Producer Mini-Lab was started as a program to develop skills and talent for emerging Indigenous producers. Among its alumni are Cara Mumford, Michelle Latimer and Jeremy Torrie.

=== Jeff Barnaby Grant ===
In 2023, imagineNATIVE and Netflix partnered on the Jeff Barnaby Grant, a granting program for emerging indigenous speculative fiction filmmakers created in memory of film director Jeff Barnaby following his death in 2022. The inaugural recipients, announced in May 2023, were Bronwyn Szabo, Walter Scott, Kristina Fithern-Stiele, Gavin Baird and Tank Standing Buffalo.

== See also ==
- American Indian Film Festival
- List of films featuring colonialism
