= Kevin Papatie =

Canadian filmmaker

Kevin Papatie is an indigenous Canadian filmmaker of the Algonquin community of Kitcisakik, located in the Abitibi region of Quebec. Papatie is involved with The Wakiponi Mobile, a mobile media training and production studio that travels to Quebec's Aboriginal communities offering audio-visual training internships for young First nation people.

== Film career ==
In 2006, Kevin Papatie directed his first short fiction Wabak as one of the first members of young creators from the Wapikoni mobile. In Wabak, Papatie tells the story of the first Algonquian to be born and the experiences, good or evil, the young child will encounter through his path. Wabak earned Papatie and his co-director Gilles Penobsway two prizes, the Main Film Jeune Espoir (Young Hope) prize at the First Peoples’ Festival 2007 in Montreal and the Best Experimental Film at the Winnipeg Aboriginal Film Festival in 2007. During that same year Kevin Papatie directed his second short, Le bon sens.

In 2007, Kevin Papatie released two short documentaries, Un grand départ and The Amendment, which won the imagineNATIVE Best Indigenous Language Production Award when it was shown as part of ShortCuts Canada at the 2008 Toronto International Film Festival. Later that year The Amendment was given a theatrical release as a short film preceding Denys Arcand's The Age of Ignorance. It went on to win the 2008 Prix de l’image Sony at the festival Filmer à tout prix in Brussels and the 2009 Identity Award at the Festival de cine de los Pueblos Indigenas y las naciones sin de Valparaiso in Chile.

In 2008 Papatie released Entre l'arbre et l'écorce, which won the Artistic Creation Mention from the Conseil des arts et des lettres du Québec for the annual of "Rendez-vous du cinéma québécois" in Montreal and the Identity Award at Festival de cine de los Pueblos Indigenas y las naciones sin de Valparaiso in Chili. His 2009 short film Nous Sommes was screened for the first time and in the following year won the Prix de la Découverte (Discovery Prize) at the Festival de films de Portneuf sur l’environnement in Portnef. Métis scholar Karine Bertrand has commented on Papatie's work, stating that he "encompasses the majority of the themes exploited by the young filmmakers of the Wapikoni, namely the quest for identity, the questions of transmission, intergenerational relationships and contemporary conflicts between tradition and modernity".

== Filmography ==
- Wabak (2006)
- Le bon sens (2006)
- Un grand départ (A great Departure) (2007)
- The Amendment (2007)
- Entre l'arbre et l'écorce (Between two Worlds) (2008)
- Nous Sommes (We are) (2009)
- Waseya dizihin (Treasure of light) (2010)
- Indian taxi (2011)
- Shamanitu (2012)
- Sakitakwin (Freedom) (2012)
- Le rêve (The Dream) (2013)
- Kokom (2014)
- Trente-cinq (Thirty five) (2016)

== Awards ==
Award name	Festival / Awards Ceremony	Name of Film	Year
Best Experimental Film	Winnipeg Aboriginal Film Festival	Wabak (2006)	2007
Best Indigenous Language Film	ImagineNATIVE Film Festival	The Amendment (2008)	2008
