= Ta'Kaiya Blaney =

Canadian singer, actress, and environmental activist

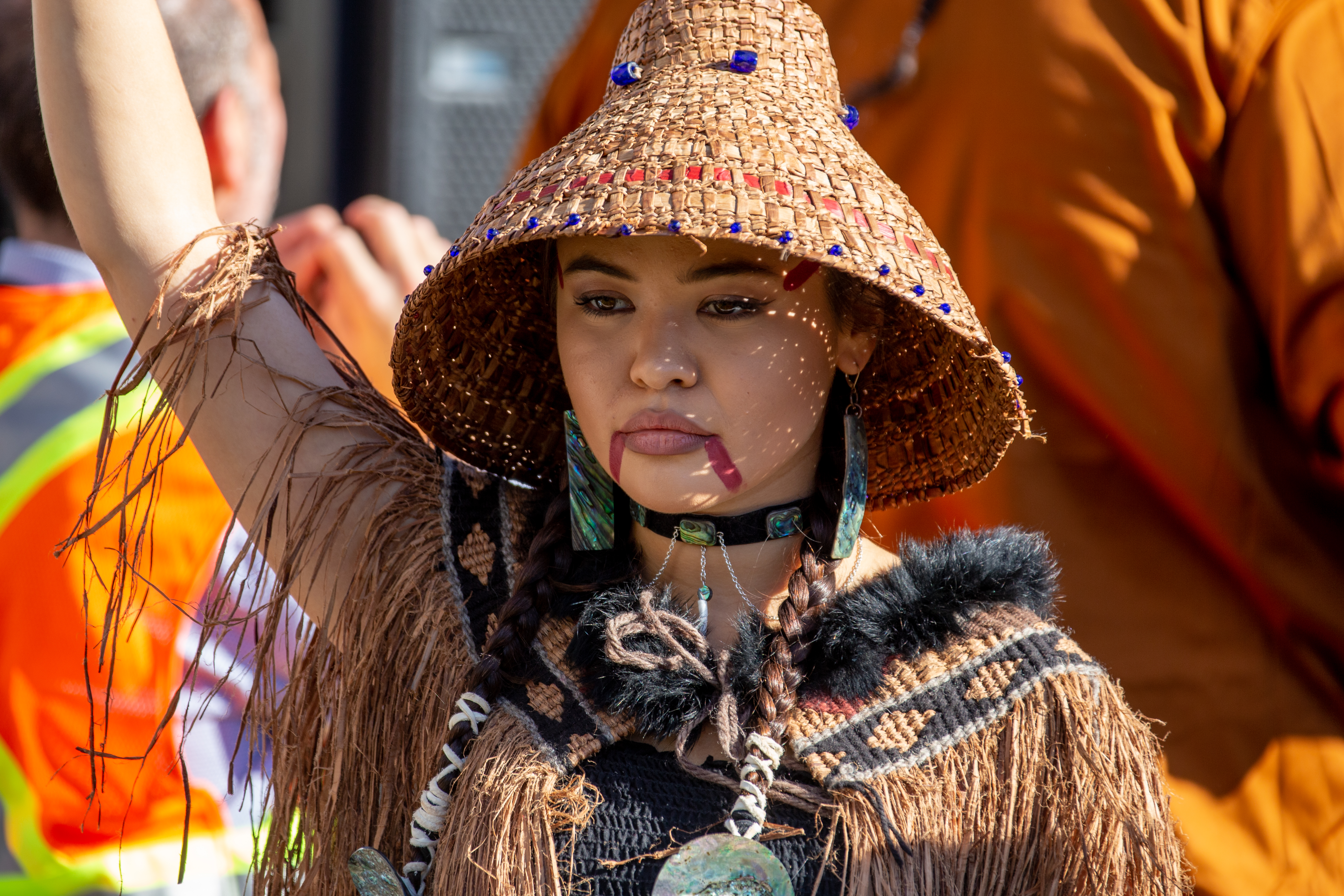
- Ta'Kaiya Blaney in 2019
- Citizenship: Tla'amin
- Occupations: Actress, vocalist
- Notable work: Kayak to Klemtu (2017), Monkey Beach (2020)

Ta'Kaiya Blaney (born 2001) is a Canadian First Nations (Tla A'min) actress, singer, speaker, and environmental activist.

Blaney is an ambassador for the Native Children's Survival Indigenous Children Fund and Salish Sea Youth Foundation and is known for giving speeches at United Nations meetings around the world.

== Awards and achievements ==
For her work in the 2017 film Kayak to Klemtu, Blaney won a Leo Award for Best Lead Performance. She has also appeared in the films Savage, Monkey Beach and Seventeen.

In 2020, she was the recipient of an Indspire Award.

Blaney released her first song and music video, "Shallow Waters", at age 10. She won the award for Best Music Video at the 2016 American Indian Film Festival for "Earth Revolution".
