= Liselotte Wajstedt =

Saami director and author

Liselotte Wajstedt (born 1973) is a Sámi Swedish documentary filmmaker, director, screenwriter and artist. She is noted for her experimental, multimedia, feminist exploration of Sámi identity, trauma, and cultural memory using moving image short and full-length feature films.

== Early life and education ==
Wajstedt was born on 15 September, 1973 in Kiruna, Sweden. She is Sámi on her mother's side. Her father, Jan Vajstedt, is an artist. Wajstedt grew up in the Ullspiran neighborhood of Kiruna in the far north of Swedish Sápmi. She was interested in art from her teens on. She left Kiruna, dropping out of secondary school in 1991, and moving to southern Sweden where she studied at several independent art schools gaining a background in painting, animation, and experimental filmmaking. She attended the Project Programme in Free Art at the Royal Institute of Art. She gained a Bachelor of Arts in Expression in Convergent Media from Gotland University in 2011. She also completed the Alma Scriptwriting Programme for feature films and TV series in 2022.

== Career ==
Based in Stockholm, she has made over two dozen short and feature-length experimental feminist Sámi documentaries. She uses many media including music video, dance, animation, claymation, time lapse photography, archival footage, voice overs, stop-motion, and superimposition. Wajstedt’s films are often about multiple topics and serve as a personal exploration of her own Sámi family roots and of Sámi traditions. An example is her 2008 feature length film called Sámi Nieida Jojk, a road movie where she mixes animation and music to deal with questions of Sami identity. In 2024, Wajstedt curated the sixth Sámi Film Festival in Seattle, Washington, USA.

== Filmography ==
- In My Hand (2025), co-directed with Marja Helander was first shown in Sweden at the Göteborg Film Festival and in Norway at the Tromsø International Film Festival, where it won the Tromsøpalmen – Best Short Film. It also won Best Short Documentary at the indigenous film festival imagineNATIVE 2025.
- EADNI (2023) was shown at the 59th International Art Exhibition in the Venice Biennale.
- Tystnaden i Sápmi or The Silence of Sápmi, 72:00 min, (2022)
- "The Fire", 9:50 min, (2017)
- Kiruna The Driftblock (2016)
- Burn the drums / Goahti, music video, 2:04 min (2016)
- Goahti, silent film, 10:26 min (2016)
- The Lost One, 6:30 min (2014)
- Jorinda's Journey, 16:00 min (2014)
- Jorinda / Cherry On Top, music video for The Knife 9:00 min (2014)
- Kiruna–Rymdvägen or Kiruna–Space Road, 52:00 min (2013)
- A soul of a city, 5:50 min (2012)
- I am in Làvvu, art film, installation 5:00 min (2011)
- Giro, 3:00 min (2011)
- Árvas, music video for Sofia Jannok 3:40 min (2009)
- Faces, short film 3:29 min (2008)
- Reindeers, short film (2008)
- A Sami In The City, 8:00 min (2007)
- The Sami and her body, 4:52 min (2007)
- Sami Nieida Jojk (Sami Daughter Yoik) documentary 58:30 min (2007)
- Koltloop, experimental short film with material from "Sámi Nieida Jojk" ´3.18 min (2005)
- Rockabilly music video, Fe-mail 8.48 min. (2005)

== Exhibitions ==
- The Lost One at Bildmuseet, Umeå University, from 2014-05-25 to 2014-09-07 and Faces and Árvas at Bildmuseet Umeå University, from 2010-03-06 to 2010-03-14.
