= Tina Keeper =

Canadian actress, producer and former politician

Tina Keeper CM OM MSM
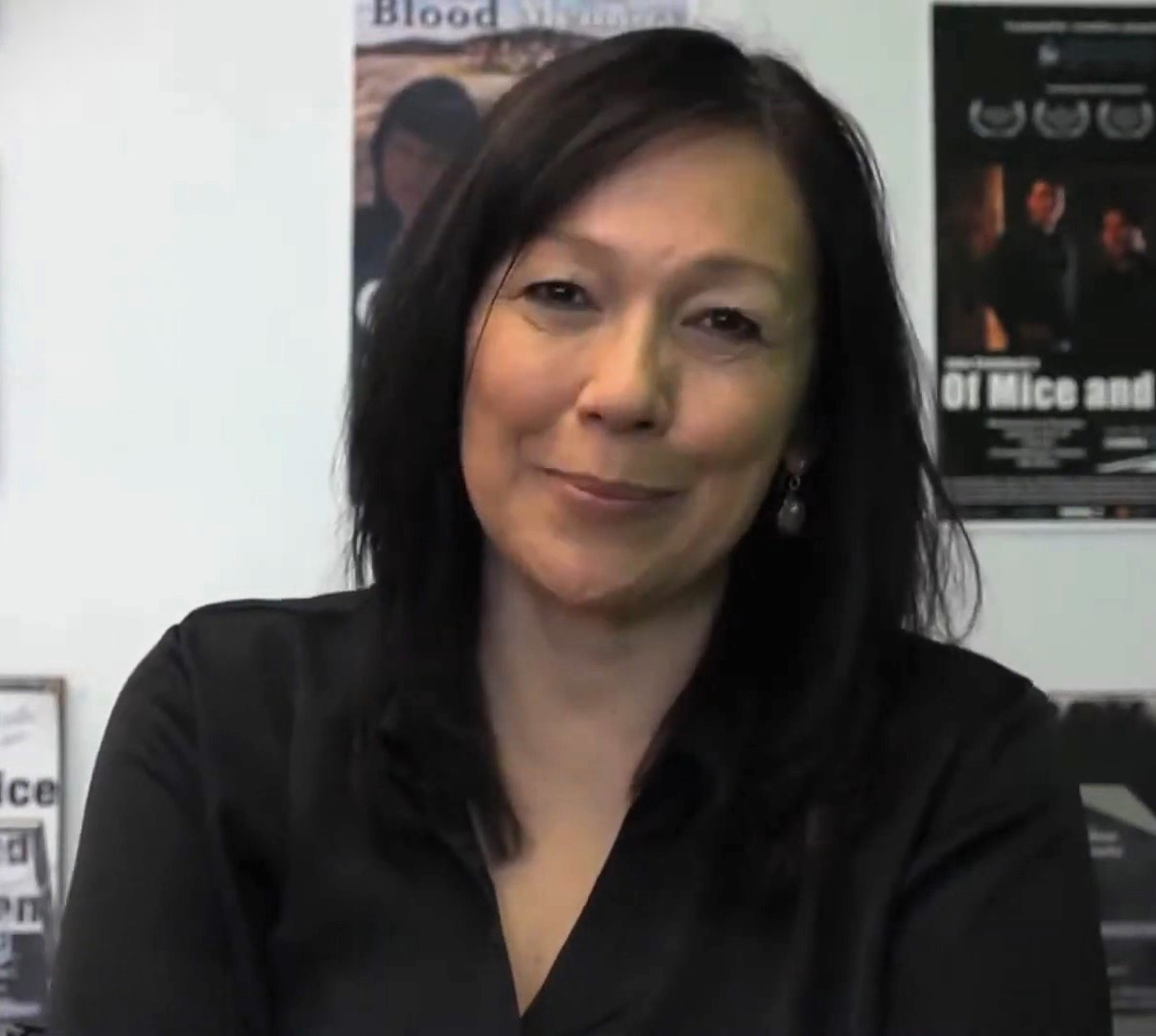
- Keeper in 2014

Member of Parliament for Churchill
- In office January 23, 2006 – October 14, 2008

Personal details
- Born: March 20, 1962 (age 64) Winnipeg, Manitoba, Canada
- Party: Liberal
- Profession: Politician; actress; film producer

Christina Jean Keeper CM OM MSM (born March 20, 1962) is a Canadian-Cree actress, film producer and former politician who served as a Member of Parliament (MP) for the riding of Churchill from 2006 to 2008 Canadian federal election.

First known for her role as RCMP officer Michelle Kenidi in the CBC Television series North of 60, she was elected to the House of Commons of Canada in the 2006 Canadian federal election, and served as a Liberal Party of Canada Member of Parliament representing the electoral district of Churchill. Following her defeat in the 2008 Canadian federal election, she returned to film and television, and continues to work as both an actress and a film producer.

== Background ==
A member of the Norway House Cree Nation in northern Manitoba, she was born in Winnipeg. She is the granddaughter of Olympic long distance runner Joe Keeper and the daughter of Joseph I. Keeper, a member of the Order of Canada, and Phyllis Keeper (née Beardy), an Anglican priest.

Keeper studied history and theatre at the University of Winnipeg. Originally planning to become a history professor, she instead became an actor after getting involved in an indigenous theatre company in Winnipeg.

== Acting ==
Keeper had a number of supporting roles in film, most notably in the National Film Board of Canada docudrama short For Angela, before being cast in North of 60 in 1992. She was a five-time Gemini Award nominee for Best Actress in a Continuing Leading Dramatic Role for her work on the series, winning the award at the 11th Gemini Awards in 1997. At the 9th Gemini Awards in 1995, she also received a Gemini nomination for Performance in a Children's or Youth Program or Series, for her performance in For Angela.

Following the end of North of 60 as a regular series, Keeper continued her role as Michelle Kenidi in several North of 60 television films, and appeared in the films Heater, Skins and On the Corner, until she decided to seek the Liberal nomination in Churchill in 2005.

In 2010, Keeper partnered with Buffalo Gal Pictures to co-produce with Animikisee Digital Pictures the APTN drama series Cashing In. More recently she has acted in the television series Mohawk Girls, Heartland and Acting Good, and the films Through Black Spruce, Falls Around Her and Stellar.

A partner in the film production firm Kistikan Pictures, she was a producer of Through Black Spruce, as well as the films Road of Iniquity, Sky Stories and REDress Redress Project. In 2014, she participated in the creation of Going Home Star, a Royal Winnipeg Ballet production on the theme of indigenous reconciliation.

== Political career ==
Keeper was elected as a Member of Parliament in the 2006 Canadian federal election, representing the Liberal Party in Churchill.

She served as the Official Opposition's Critic for Public Health and Canadian Heritage, and as a Special Advisor for Aboriginal Outreach in the 39th Parliament of Canada.

While Keeper has not sought office since, she continues to work as an advocate. She currently serves as chair of the board of trustees for the Helen Betty Osborne Memorial Foundation, as a member of the advisory committees of the Urban Shaman Gallery, Red Cross Manitoba and Canadians for a New Partnership, and an honorary witness for the Truth and Reconciliation Commission.

== Awards ==
In addition to her Gemini Award nominations and win, she is the recipient of a National Aboriginal Achievement Award, three American Indian Film Festival awards for acting and producing, and a 2014 Canadian Civil Liberties Association award for Public Engagement. She was named ACTRA's Woman of the Year in 2017. In June 2017, Keeper received both an honorary doctor of letters from Wilfrid Laurier University, and a Governor General's Meritorious Service Medal for the ballet Going Home Star.

She was named to the Order of Manitoba in 2002.

In December 2019, the Academy of Canadian Cinema and Television announced Keeper as the recipient of its Earle Grey Award at the 8th Canadian Screen Awards.

In May 2025, Keeper was inducted as a Member of the Order of Canada by Governor General Mary Simon. The order recognizes her work as an actress and producer, most known for her role in CBC's North of 60, as well as for being one of the first Cree members of Parliament.
