= Darlene Naponse =

Canadian Anishinaabe filmmaker and activist

- Occupations: Director, writer, filmmaker
- Years active: 2002–present
- Notable work: Falls Around Her; Stellar

Darlene Naponse is an Anishinaabe filmmaker, writer, director, and community activist from Canada. She is most noted for her 2018 film Falls Around Her, which premiered at the 2018 Toronto International Film Festival in September 2018 and subsequently won the Air Canada Audience Choice Award at the imagineNATIVE Film + Media Arts Festival in October.

A member of the Atikameksheng Anishnawbek First Nation near Sudbury, Ontario, she previously directed the short films Retrace (2002) and She Is Water (2010), and the feature films Cradlesong (2003) and Every Emotion Costs (2010). In 2017, she was a shortlisted Journey Prize finalist for her short story adaptation of "She Is Water".

She serves as a part-time faculty member in the Department of English at Laurentian University.

Her film Stellar went into production in 2021, and premiered at the 2022 Toronto International Film Festival.

Her documentary film Aki premiered at the 2025 Toronto International Film Festival. The film also had a gala screening at the 2025 Cinéfest Sudbury International Film Festival.

== Personal life and activism ==
Naponse was born and raised in the Atikameksheng Anishnawbek First Nation, northern Ontario. Her upbringing of fishing, gathering, hunting, and connecting with the land and her community largely informs her art. She earned her Bachelor of Arts in English with a focus on film from Laurentian University, and received a First Nations Creative Writing Certificate from the En’owkin International School for Writing (University of Victoria). In 2015, she received a Master of Fine Arts in creative writing at the Institute of American Indian Arts in Santa Fe, New Mexico.

Within her community, she has worked to improve and develop governance strategies. She served as chair of a committee to work with community leaders and elders to write the Atikameksheng Anishnawbek First Nation Gchi-Naaknigewin (Constitution), which was ratified by the community in 2015. She continues to participate in First Nations governance and engage in environmental and human rights activism.

She owns Pine Needle Productions, which is a multi-media studio located in Atikameksheng Anishnawbek.
