= Marks of Mana =

- Directed by: Lisa Taouma
- Written by: Lisa Taouma
- Produced by: Lisa Taouma
- Cinematography: Hayden Aull, Jake Farani, Elizabeth Koroivulaono, Twayne Laumua, Faanati Mamea, Christo Montes, Arthur Rasmussen; Julia Mage-au Gray (Papua New Guinea)
- Edited by: Sacha Campbell, Damon Fepulea'i, Mario Gaoa, Daniel Habedank (online editor), Twayne Laumua
- Music by: Mema Wilda
- Release date: 2018
- Running time: 56 min
- Country: New Zealand

Marks of Mana is a documentary about Pacific female tattooing. It is the first film to cover the subject.

== Background ==
The film was produced and directed by Lisa Taouma, a New Zealand film maker of Samoan ancestry. It features Samoan tatau artist Tyla Vaeau Ta’ufo’ou of an indigenous tattoo studio on K’ Road called Karanga Ink. In the film she returns to Samoa to learn more and reconnect.

The film won the 2018 best documentary award at the imagineNATIVE indigenous film festival in Toronto, Canada and the Best Cinematography award at the DocEdge Festival in Aotearoa 2019. It also won the Best Pasifika Programme at the 2020 New Zealand TV Awards.

The song "Pese o le tatau" which was performed by Mema Wilda was commissioned for the film.

== Reception ==
The film had its New Zealand premiere in Wellington. It was also set to screen at the imagineNATIVE indigenous film festival in Toronto, Canada in the week following the Wellington premiere.

On 6 June 2021, the film was screened at the Dunedin Public Art Gallery.

The screening at the Queensland Multicultural Center which included a Q&A session with director Lisa Taouma, tatau artist Julia Gray, Maryann Talia Pau and Lanatina from House of Iliganoa was sold out.

== Credits ==
- Actor: Goddess - Cheyenne Maiava, Susana Paese Si'a
- Additional footage - Julia Mage-au Gray (Papua New Guinea)
- Art design - Linda Lepou
- Camera - Hayden Aull, Jake Farani, Elizabeth Koroivulaono, Twayne Laumua, Faanati Mamea, Christo Montes, Arthur Rasmussen
- Director - Lisa Taouma
- Editor - Sacha Campbell, Damon Fepulea'i, Mario Gaoa, Daniel Habedank (online editor), Twayne Laumua
- Producer - Kay Ellmers (executive), Lisa Taouma
- Production Manager - Natasha Panui-Morris
- Set and design - Paul Scheuer
- Sound - Colleen Brennan, Marcus Lawson, Wilhelm Voigt
- Subject research - Tyla Vaeau Ta’ufo’ou
- Voice over - (Legend section) Goretti Chadwick
