= Lisa Jackson (filmmaker) =

First Nations filmmaker

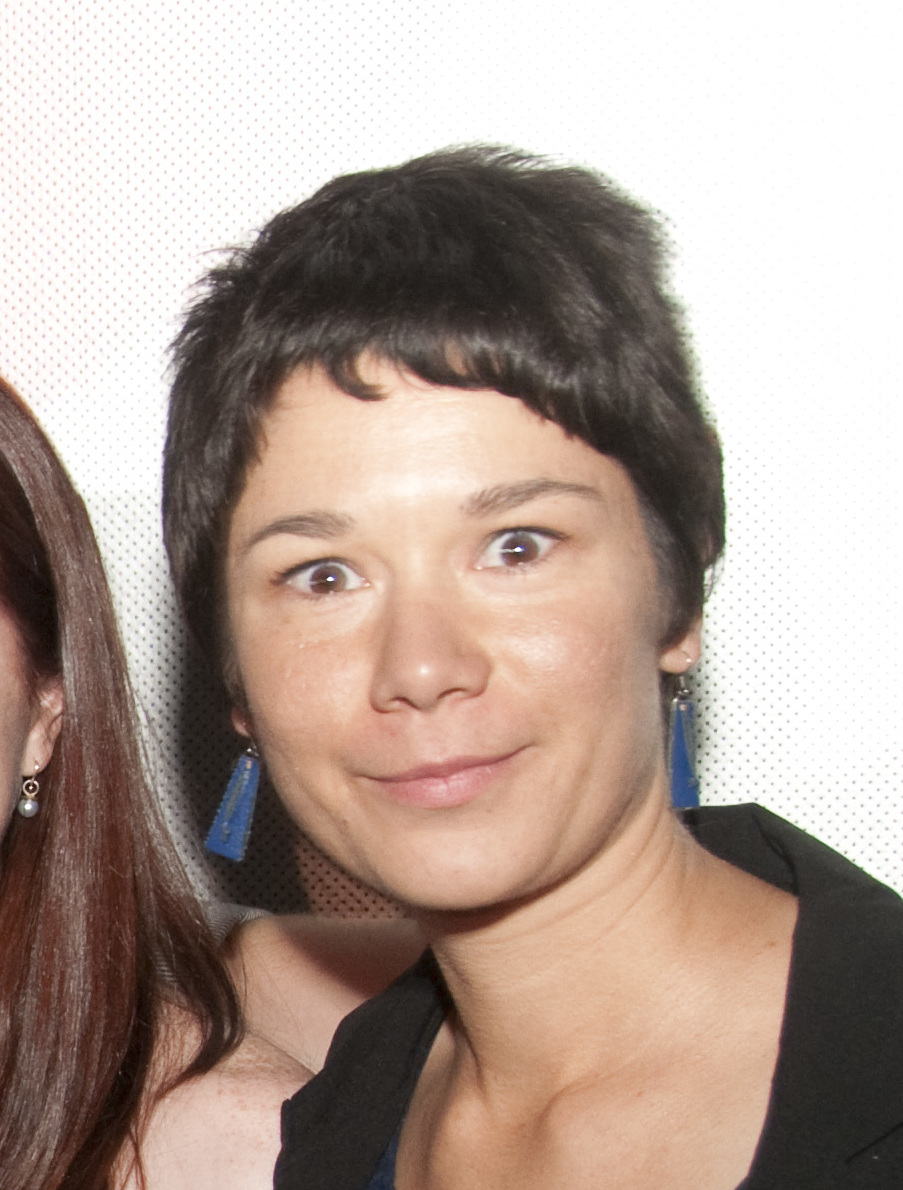
- Lisa Jackson in 2011
- Citizenship: Aamjiwnaang First Nation and Canadian
- Education: York University (MFA, 2016), Simon Fraser University (BFA)
- Awards: Canadian Screen Award, Genie Award

Lisa Jackson is a Canadian Screen Award and Genie Award-winning Canadian and Anishinaabe filmmaker. Her films have been broadcast on APTN and Knowledge Network, as well as CBC's ZeD, Canadian Reflections and Newsworld and have screened at festivals including HotDocs, Edinburgh International Film Festival, Melbourne, Worldwide Short Film Festival and Berlin International Film Festival.

Her recent VR piece Biidaban: First Light premiered at Tribeca, won a Canadian Screen Award, and was nominated for a Webby Award. Her multimedia work Transmissions, an immersive film installation presented by the Electric Company Theatre premiered in Vancouver in September 2019. Her recent IMAX short film Lichen premiered in April 2019, as part of Outer Worlds, a commissioned project featuring the work of five artists including Michael Snow.

== Early life and education ==
Jackson is an Ojibway member of the Aamjiwnaang First Nation. Jackson holds a BFA in Film Production from Simon Fraser University and an MFA in Film Production from York University.

== Career ==
In 2004, Jackson wrote, directed, and produced Suckerfish, a short experimental documentary about her relationship with her mother. The film, a mixture of photographs and animation, was screened at more than fifty festivals and was broadcast nationally in Canada, on CBC.

From 1999 to 2006, Jackson was a director and producer on the media team at Open Learning Agency, as a scriptwriter and carrying out field production for their online educational media. Her work aired on Knowledge Network, BC's educational broadcaster. From 2007 to 2013, she has worked as a story mentor with "Our World" Initiative and would travel to remote Aboriginal communities in BC and the Yukon to teach digital storytelling workshops. In these workshops, Jackson taught small groups of youth how to make films in Indigenous languages, using contemporary digital technology.

In 2009 and 2014, Jackson worked with Embargo Collective, an ongoing international group of seven Indigenous artists who collaborate and challenge one another to create new films. Savage was the result of the first Embargo Collective in 2009 and was included in the 2013 exhibition Witnesses: Art and Canada's Indian Residential Schools, at the Morris and Helen Belkin Art Gallery. Intemperance premiered on October 26, 2014 at the closing night of imagineNATIVE.

Since 2014, she has been working as the Director Mentor at National Screen Institute's Aboriginal Documentary Program. Jackson has recently worked with special projects featuring the production of short films by First Nations filmmakers, including the National Film Board's Vistas series, screened as part of the public presentations of the Canadian Olympics in Vancouver, and Knowledge Network's Our First Voices television series on Indigenous languages in British Columbia.

Jackson was the producer of The Citizen Minutes, eight short films commissioned by Hot Docs in 2021.

== Filmography ==
- 2004: Suckerfish – Director/Writer
- 2007: Reservation Soldiers – Director/Writer/Producer>
- 2009: The Visit – Director/Writer<
- 2009: Pushing The Line: Art Without Reservations – Director/Writer
- 2009: Savage – Director/Writer
- 2010: Our First Voices – Director/Writer<
- 2011: Pow.Wow.Wow – Director
- 2011: Parkdale – Director/Co-writer
- 2013: Dynamic Range – Director/Writer
- 2013: Hidden Legacies – Director/Writer
- 2013 :How a People Live – Director/Writer
- 2013: Snare – Director/Writer/Producer
- 2013: How a People Live - Director/Writer
- 2014: Intemperance – Director/Writer
- 2015: The Embargo Project – Director (segment)
- 2016: Secret Location - Virtual reality piece on BC’s Highway of Tears for CBC’s The Current
- 2017: 1491: The Untold Story of the Americas Before Columbus - docudrama mini-series for APTN and ZDF
- 2017: Indictment: The Crimes of Shelly Chartier (co-written and directed with Shane Belcourt)
- 2018: Biidaaban: First Light – Director
- 2024: Wilfred Buck - Director

== Awards and honors ==
In 2004, Jackson received the imagineNATIVE Film + Media Arts Festival Alliance Atlantis Mentorship award.

In 2005, Jackson was awarded the Vancouver Arts Award for Emerging Media Artists.

In 2008, Jackson's one-hour documentary Reservation Soldiers, for CTV's W5 Presents, was awarded the Golden Sheaf Award at the Yorkton Film Festival for Best Aboriginal Production, the Best Feature Documentary (International) Award at the Talking Stick Film Festival (New Mexico), the Bronze Remi Award at Worldfest Houston 2008 for TV Special: Documentary.

In 2010, Jackson's Cree-language musical Savage was the recipient of a Genie award for Best Live Action Short Film, the ReelWorld Film Festival Award in Outstanding Canadian Short Film, Leo Awards for Best Performance by an Actress in a short drama (Skeena Reece), Best Editing in a Short Drama, and the Yorkton Golden Sheaf: Best Multicultural Film award.

In 2012, Jackson was the recipient of Playback's 10 to Watch Award in addition to The ReelWorld Festival Trailblazer Award.

In 2012, Jackson was commissioned by imagineNATIVE Film + Media Arts Festival Stolen Sisters Digital Initiative to create Snare, originally screened as a one-minute performance-based film, later extended to 3.5 minutes.

In 2019, after premiering at Tribeca Film Festival, Jackson won the Canadian Screen Award for Best Immersive Experience – Fiction for her VR piece Biidaaban: First Light.

In 2021, Jackson's documentary Wilfred Buck won the Hot Docs Forum Best Canadian Pitch prize.
