= Nîpawistamâsowin: We Will Stand Up =

2019 Canadian film

nîpawistamâsowin: We Will Stand Up
- Film poster
- Directed by: Tasha Hubbard
- Written by: Tasha Hubbard
- Produced by: Tasha Hubbard; George Hupka; Jon Montes
- Narrated by: Tasha Hubbard
- Cinematography: George Hupka
- Edited by: Hans Olson
- Music by: Jason Burnstick
- Production companies: Downstream Documentary Productions; National Film Board of Canada
- Distributed by: National Film Board of Canada
- Release date: April 25, 2019 (Hot Docs)
- Running time: 98 minutes
- Country: Canada
- Languages: English; Cree

nîpawistamâsowin: We Will Stand Up is a Canadian documentary film, directed by Tasha Hubbard and released in 2019. The film centres on the 2016 killing of Colten Boushie, and depicts his family's struggle to attain justice after the controversial acquittal of Boushie's killer. The film premiered in April 2019 as the opening film of the Hot Docs Canadian International Documentary Festival, the first time the festival had ever selected an Indigenous-themed film as its opening gala. The film received universally positive reviews from critics.

== Plot ==
The film centres on the 2016 killing of Colten Boushie, and depicts his family's struggle to attain justice after the controversial acquittal of Boushie's killer. Narrated by Hubbard, the film also includes a number of animated segments which contextualize the broader history of Indigenous peoples of Canada.

== Release ==
The film premiered in April 2019 as the opening film of the Hot Docs Canadian International Documentary Festival, the first time the festival had ever selected an Indigenous-themed film as its opening gala. It subsequently had its commercial premiere at the Roxy Theatre in Saskatoon, Saskatchewan on May 23, 2019, before screening on a Canadian tour, including a week at the TIFF Bell Lightbox.

== Reception ==
The film received universally positive reviews from critics. As of October 2021, 100% of the seven reviews compiled on Rotten Tomatoes are positive, with an average rating of 8.6/10. The film won the award for Best Canadian Feature Documentary at Hot Docs, the Colin Low Award for Best Canadian Documentary at the 2019 DOXA Documentary Film Festival, and the Audience Choice Award for Best Feature Film at the 2019 imagineNATIVE Film and Media Arts Festival. In January 2020, it was named the winner of the Vancouver Film Critics Circle award for Best Canadian Documentary. The film won the Canadian Screen Award for Best Feature Length Documentary at the 8th Canadian Screen Awards in 2020.

== Alternate version ==
A shorter edit of the film was also broadcast by CBC Television in fall 2019 as an episode of CBC Docs POV.
