= Carmen Moore =

Canadian actress (born 1972)

- Born: 24 December 1972 (age 53); Burnaby, British Columbia, Canada
- Occupation: Actress
- Years active: 1992–present

Carmen Moore (born 24 December 1972) is a Canadian actress known for her work in television.

She is known for her role as Loreen Cassway on Arctic Air (for which she was nominated for a Leo Award in 2012) and the lead role of Leona Stoney, on the acclaimed series Blackstone (for which she has garnered five Leo nominations with three wins for Best Lead Performance and was nominated for a Gemini Award in 2011 and a Canadian Screen Award in 2017). She's also known for her role as Simone Cardinal on Godiva's for which she earned a 2006 Leo nomination.

== Early life ==
Moore is of mixed heritage including Wet'suwet'en and is registered with the Hagwilget Village First Nation in Hazelton, British Columbia. She was born in Burnaby, British Columbia and grew up in Coquitlam, British Columbia. She attended Port Moody Senior Secondary School. In 1991 she joined the Spirit Song Native Theatre Co., and worked with them for nine months. Her first professional theatre gig was with Theatre New Brunswick's Young Company tour in 1992 and got rave reviews. Carmen was nominated for a Jessie Richardson Award for Best Supporting Actress in Fend Players' Danceland in 1993. She continued her work in theatre, as well as auditioning for TV and film. For Firehall Arts Centre's Someday she was nominated for another Jessie, this time for Best Actress.

== Career ==
From 2011 to 2015 she was the lead of the APTN TV show Blackstone in the role of Leona Stoney. For this she won three Leo Awards for Best Lead Performance by a Female in a Dramatic Series, in 2011, 2014, and 2016. Moore was also nominated for a Gemini Award for Best Performance by an Actress in a Continuing Leading Dramatic Role in 2011, was nominated for a 2016 UBCP/ACTRA Award for Blackstone and was nominated for a 2017 Canadian Screen Award. She portrayed the role of Loreen Cassway on the CBC series Arctic Air from 2012 to 2014, for which she was nominated for the Best Supporting Performance by a Female in a Dramatic Series in 2012.

She received a Canadian Screen Award nomination for Best Actress at the 9th Canadian Screen Awards in 2021 for her performance in the film Rustic Oracle.

In 2021, Moore recurred on The Flash as Kristen Kramer.

== Producing and directing career ==
Carmen has dabbled in the producing and directing side of the industry. She was associate producer on Two Indians Talking, and producer on White Indians Walking, both written by Andrew Genaille. Her directing debut happened in 2015 on the short film Ariel Unraveling, a BravoFACT Award winner.

== Filmography ==
=== Film ===
Year	Title	Role	Notes
1999	Keys to Kingdoms	Ex-Wife	Short
2002	Spooky House	Dawn Starr	Main role
2006	Unnatural & Accidental	Rebecca	Lead role
2007	Martian Child	Miss Margie	
2008	Edison and Leo	Ute (voice)	
2010	Momentum	Violet	Short
2010	Two Indians Talking	Sue	
2014	Not Indian Enough	Karen	Short
2016	Lost Solace	April	
2016	The Goodnight Kiss	April	Short
2019	Rustic Oracle	Susan	
2023	Double Life	Detective Carmen Traxler	
2024	The Birds Who Fear Death	Shannon	
2025	Meadowlarks		

=== Television ===
Year	Title	Role	Notes
1995	The Commish	Shirley	"In the Shadows of the Gallows"
1996	Brothers of the Frontier	Chewlynndit	TV film
1996	Two	Jamina	"Dream Prisoner"
1997	Rose Hill	Shining Water	TV film
1997	Dead Man's Gun	Winter Bird	"Medicine Man"
1997	Police Academy: The Series	Joanie	"Two Men and a Baby"
1997	North of 60	Janine Carr	"Peter and the Wolf"
1997	Stargate SG-1	Laboratory Assistant	Episode: "Cold Lazarus"
1998	The Net	Lucia	"Go Like You Know"
1999	Revenge of the Land	Agnes	TV film
1999–2000	Nothing Too Good for a Cowboy	Rita George	Regular role
2000–01	Seven Days	Raquel / Officer Merrill	"The Cuban Missile", "The Final Countdown"
2001	Crossfire Trail	Dancing Flower	TV film
2001	UC: Undercover	Marianna Torres	"Honor Among Thieves"
2001–02	Wolf Lake	Deputy Molly Bloom	Main role
2002	Tom Stone	Sherry	Recurring role
2003–04	Andromeda	Tri-Jema	Recurring role
2004	The Collector	Janet Carter	"The Roboticist"
2004	The Life	Sheila	TV film
2004–06	Raven Tales	Frog / Narrator (voice)	Recurring role
2005	The 4400	Stacey Papequash	"Weight of the World"
2005–06	Godiva's	Simone	Main role
2006	Battlestar Galactica: The Resistance	Sister Tivenan	TV miniseries
2007	Eureka	Dr. Childress	"Noche de suenos"
2007–08	Flash Gordon	Joely Lavant	Recurring role
2008	The Guard	Pamela Highway	"When All Else Fails"
2008	Raven Tales: The Games	Frog (voice)	TV film
2009	Killer Hair	Sherri	TV film
2009	Psych	Rosa	"He Dead"
2009	Tales of an Urban Indian	Krista	TV film
2010	Meteor Storm	Harper	TV film
2010	Hellcats	Sarah Laurenson	Episode: "Finish What We Started"
2010	Caprica	Fidelia Fazekas	3 episodes; Episodes: "The Heavens Will Rise", "Here Be Dragons", "Apotheosis"
2010	Supernatural	Doctor	The Devil You Know
2011	Time After Time	Officer Rita	TV film
2011–15	Blackstone	Leona Stoney	Lead role
2012	Battlestar Galactica: Blood & Chrome	Nina Leothe	TV film
2012–14	Arctic Air	Loreen Cassway	Lead role
2013	Supernatural	Sgt. Miranda Bates	Episode: "Devil May Care"
2014–15	Girlfriends' Guide to Divorce	Principal Barrows	2 episodes; Episodes: "Rule #47", "Rule #3"
2015	Unreal	Jessica Salinas	Episode: "Savior"
2015	iZombie	Suzuki's Wife	2 episodes; Episodes: "Grumpy Old Liv", "Love & Basketball"
2015–16	Arrow	Mina Fayad	3 episodes; Episodes: "Suicidal Tendencies", "Restoration", "Schism"
2016	Second Chance	Agent Sue Adair	Regular role
2016	Bates Motel	Grace Wei	Episode: "Forever"
2016	Motive	Gemma Fowler	Episode: "Chronology of Pain"
2016	Chesapeake Shores	Sally	3 episodes; Episodes: "Pilot", "Home to Roost: Parts 1 & 2"
2016	Death of a Vegas Showgirl	Celeste Flores-Narvaez	TV film
2019	Outlander	Wahkatiiosta	2 episodes; Episodes: "Man of Worth", "Providence"
2020	Cardinal	Sheila Gagne	Recurring role, 6 episodes
2020	Supernatural	Serafina	Episodes: "Unity"
2020	Vikings	Pekitaulet	2 episodes; Episodes: "The Lord Giveth... ", "The Last Act"
2020–21	Nancy Drew	Hannah Gruen	Recurring role; Episodes: "The Whisper Box," "The Clue in the Captain's Painting," "The Reunion of Lost Souls," "The Secret of the Solitary Scribe," "The Drowned Woman," "The Riddle of the Broken Doll," "The Judgement of the Perilous Captain"
2021–23	The Flash	Kristen Kramer	Recurring role, 20 episodes
2024	Jurassic World: Chaos Theory	Ronnie	Voice, recurring role, 6 episodes
