= Tasha Hubbard =

Canadian (Cree) filmmaker and educator

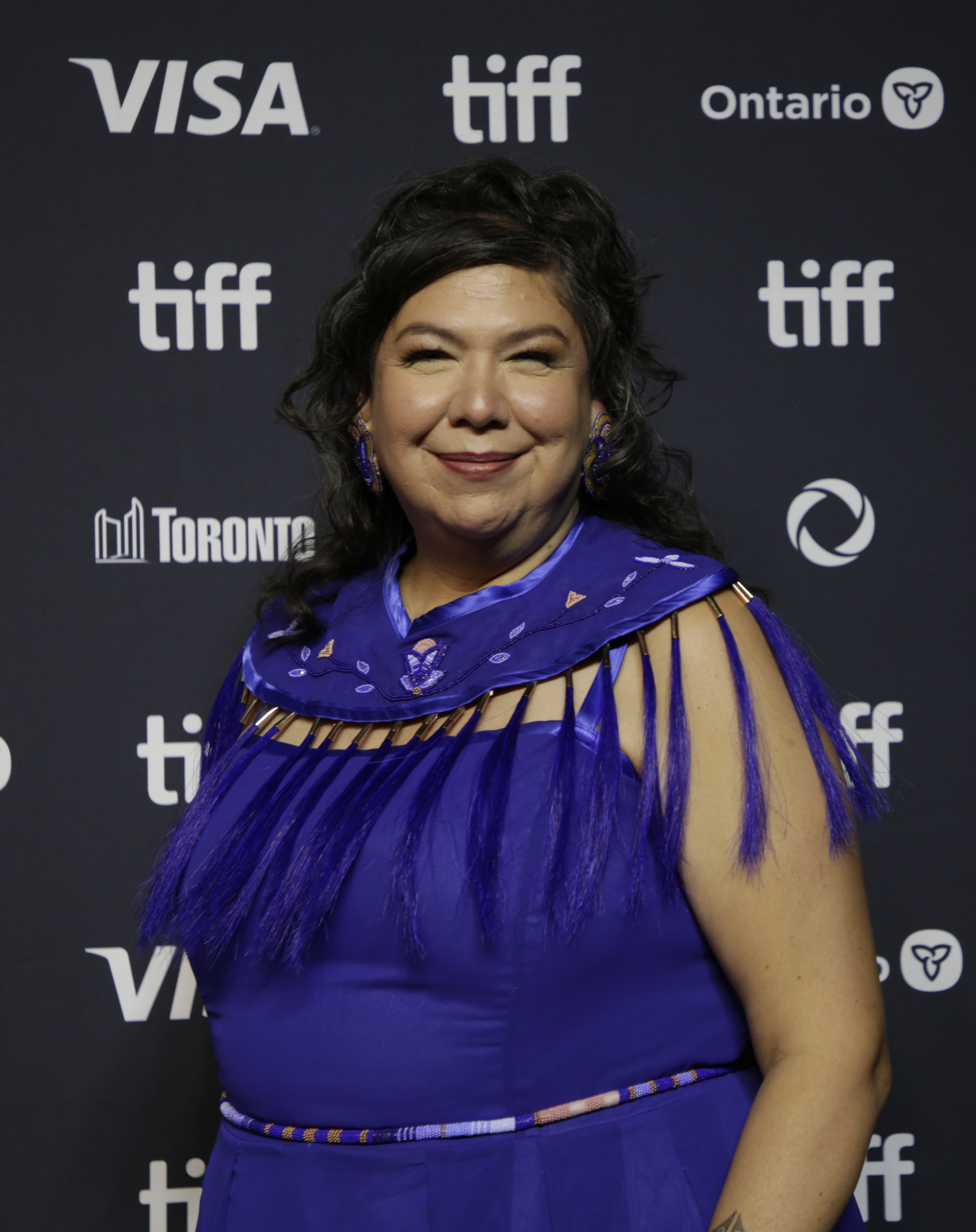
- Hubbard in 2025 at TIFF.
- Born: Carrie Alaine Pinay; 1973 (age 52–53)
- Citizenship: Canadian (Peepeekisis First Nation in Treaty Four Territory)
- Occupations: Director, Writer, Filmmaker, Associate Professor - Native Studies
- Employer: University of Alberta
- Awards: 2017 Gemini Award; 2005 Golden Sheaf Award - Aboriginal; 2016 Golden Sheaf Award - Short Subject (Non-Fiction); 2020 Golden Sheaf Award - Multicultural (Over 30 Minutes)

Tasha Hubbard is a Canadian First Nations/Cree filmmaker and educator based in Edmonton, Alberta. Hubbard's credits include three National Film Board of Canada documentaries exploring Indigenous rights in Canada: Two Worlds Colliding, a 2004 Canada Award-winning short film about the Saskatoon freezing deaths, Birth of a Family, a 2017 feature-length documentary about four siblings separated during Canada's Sixties Scoop, and nîpawistamâsowin: We Will Stand Up, a 2019 Hot Docs and DOXA Documentary award-winning documentary which examines the death of Colten Boushie, a young Cree man, and the subsequent trial and acquittal of the man who shot him.

== Family ==
Born in 1973, Hubbard's birth name was Carrie Alaine Pinay. Her biological mother was a young single Saulteaux/Métis/Cree woman whose parents and grandparents, as well as Hubbard's Cree/Nakota father, were placed into the Canadian Indian residential school system. With limited support from family and social services, Hubbard's mother gave her to a social worker whom she trusted, putting her up for adoption through the Saskatchewan Adopt Indian Metis (AIM) pilot project, part of the Sixties Scoop. Raised on a farm near Avonlea, Saskatchewan, Hubbard's adoptive parents were supportive of her search; it was her adoptive mother who first asked Hubbard, at the age of 14, if she wanted to find her biological family. Their search yielded nothing for almost two years until they hired a Cree lawyer who located Hubbard's birth mother in just two weeks; a woman who turned out to be a friend of her biological father. She met her birth mother three days after her sixteenth birthday, followed by her father, three weeks later. She would go on to reunite with all ten of her siblings, the last, a sister, at the age of twenty-two.

== Filmography ==
=== Two Worlds Colliding (2004) ===
Two Worlds Colliding is a 2004 documentary following the experience of Darrell Night, an Indigenous man dumped by police in a field on the outskirts of Saskatchewan in January 2000 in -20 °C temperature. Investigating the "freezing deaths" of Indigenous peoples in the early 2000s and the cementing of distrust and fear of the Saskatchewan police, The film premiered at ImagineNATIVE in 2004, winning a Gemini Canada Award. Two Worlds Colliding also won the Golden Sheaf Award - Aboriginal at the 2005 Yorkton Film Festival.

=== "7 Minutes" (2016) ===
This short documentary won the Golden Sheaf Award - Short Subject (Non-Fiction) at the 2016 Yorkton Film Festival.

=== Birth of a Family (2017) ===
Hubbard's own experiences helped influence her decision to make Birth of a Family, about the reunion of four First Nations siblings separated as part of the Sixties Scoop. One of four reunited siblings is Betty Ann Adam, a journalist with the Saskatoon Star Phoenix, who also co-wrote the film. Adam, a Dene, had been encouraged to document her reunion with siblings Esther, Rosalie and Ben by Marie Wilson, a commissioner with Canada's Truth and Reconciliation Commission. Adam had known Hubbard for more than a decade and approached her with the idea of making the film.

The documentary was nominated for the Hot Docs Canadian International Documentary Festival 2017 and won the 2017 EIFF Audience Award for Best Documentary Feature and 2017 Special Jury Prize - Moon Jury at the 18th Annual imagineNATIVE Film + Media Arts Festival.

=== nîpawistamâsowin: We Will Stand Up (2019) ===
nîpawistamâsowin: We Will Stand Up is a 2019 documentary that serves as Hubbard's personal reflection on the death of Colten Boushie, a young Cree man, the subsequent trial and acquittal of the man who shot him, and the aftermath of the case, which caused shock and outrage across Canada. While following the trajectory of the case and the efforts of Boushie's family to seek justice, Hubbard draws attention to prejudices in the Canadian legal system, the history of colonialism on the Prairies, and anti-Indigenous racism in Canada.

The film received the Best Canadian Feature Documentary Award at Toronto's Hot Docs Canadian International Documentary Festival, and the Colin Low Award for Canadian Documentary at Vancouver's DOXA Documentary Film Festival. Additionally, this film won the Golden Sheaf Award for Best Multicultural (Over 30 Minutes) at the 2020 Yorkton Film Festival.

=== Singing Back the Buffalo (2024) ===
Singing Back the Buffalo is a 2024 documentary that follows Indigenous visionaries and communities who are repatriating the buffalo back into the North American plains, signalling a turn for Indigenous nations, the ecosystem, and the future.

The documentary received the Nigel Moore Award at the 2024 DOXA Documentary Film Festival. It also received the Audience Award for Documentaries from the 2024 Calgary International Film Festival, as well as an honorable mention for Best Canadian Documentary.

=== Meadowlarks (2025) ===
In 2024 Hubbard began production on a scripted narrative fiction version of Birth of a Family. Meadowlarks is slated to premiere at the 2025 Toronto International Film Festival.
