= Le Dep =

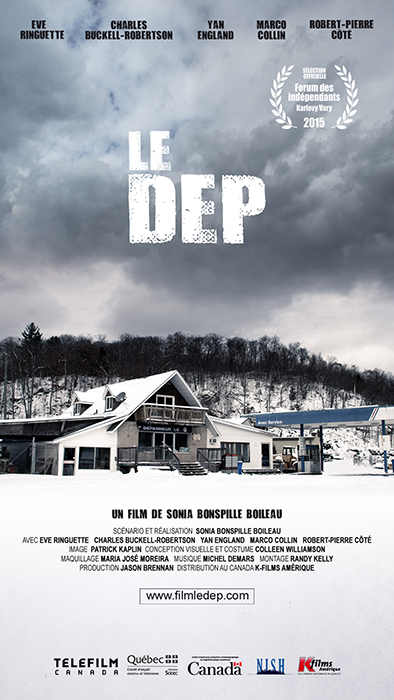
- Directed by: Sonia Boileau
- Written by: Sonia Boileau
- Produced by: Jason Brennan
- Starring: Eve Ringuette; Charles Buckell-Robertson; Yan England
- Cinematography: Patrick Kaplin
- Edited by: Randy Kelly
- Music by: Michel DeMars
- Production company: Nish Media
- Distributed by: K Films Amérique
- Release date: July 5, 2015 (Karlovy Vary)
- Running time: 77 minutes
- Country: Canada
- Language: French

Le Dep is a 2015 Canadian psychological drama film directed by Sonia Boileau. Set in a fictional Innu community, the film's dialogue is mostly in French, with some Innu-aimun. Le Dep is the first First Nations production of Telefilm Canada's Micro-Budget program. The film's world premiere was at the 2015 Karlovy Vary International Film Festival, following which the film played various festivals in Canada, the United States, and United Kingdom and had a theatrical run in Montreal.

== Plot ==
The film tells the story of a young Innu woman (played by Ève Ringuette) who is held at gunpoint one night while working at a convenience store in a small First Nations community in rural Quebec.

== Cast ==
- Eve Ringuette
- Charles Buckell-Robertson
- Yan England
- Marco Collin
- Robert-Pierre Côté

== Reception ==
In Variety, reviewer Alissa Simon found the film "an earnest but engaging social-issue drama", and commented, "its condensed framework and beaucoup dialogue make the pic resemble a classic three-act play."

In Le Soleil, reviewer Éric Moreault found that the film was full of good intentions but lacked dramatic tension and plausibility.

=== Awards and accolades ===
At the 2015 Vancouver International Film Festival, the Canadian Images features jury gave Boileau an honourable mention in the Emerging Canadian Director category for Le Dep.

At the 2015 American Indian Film Festival in San Francisco, Ringuette won the best actress award for her performance in Le Dep (she had previously won the same award in 2012 for the film Mesnak).
