= Loma Lyns =

Canadian singer-songwriter and television personality

- Also known as: Loma Lynn
- Born: Canada
- Genres: Country
- Occupation: Singer-songwriter
- Years active: 1990s–present

Loma Lynn (formerly Mathias), known professionally as Loma Lyns, is a Canadian singer-songwriter and television personality.

== Career ==
Lyns's single "Red Handed" was a Top 40 hit on the Canadian country charts in 1990, and her single "Countin' on You This Time" was a Top 40 hit in Europe. She also had chart success in 1998 with "Love Me, I'm Alive", the theme song for the Canadian Special Olympics which she co-wrote with Chuck Labelle. She has shared the stage with many country music celebrities, has appeared on CBC and CTV, performed on the last season of the Tommy Hunter show as an upcoming artist, and also sang back-up for country superstar Collin Raye. She has performed at festivals and clubs across Canada and into the U.S. In the early '90s, her music video "Who's the Stranger" garnered airtime on Canada's CMT.

In the early '90s, Lyns was also familiar face on the Aboriginal Peoples Television Network (APTN) as co-host of the hit series "Cooking With the Wolfman", and was for years the host of the documentary series "Aboriginal Voices".

== Honours ==
In 2017, she was inducted into the Great Northern Ontario Opry's Hall of Fame.

== Personal life ==
Lyns is affiliated with the Whitefish River First Nation. Her gifted Anishinaabe name is Epigishamok Anangoonhs Kwe ('Western Star Woman'). She and her spouse share a blended family of eight children, and for many years hosted foster children. Lyns continues to write and co-write music and performs live on stage a few times a year.

== Discography ==
=== Albums ===
| Release year | Title |
|---|---|
| 1990 | Red Handed |
| 1994 | Who's the Stranger |
| 1998 | Lake of Tears |

=== Singles ===
| Release year | Title | CAN Country | Album |
|---|---|---|---|
| 1996 | "Who's the Stranger" | 85 | Who's the Stranger |
