= Lisa Taouma =

Samoan-born New Zealand writer, film director, and producer

Lisa Taouma ONZM
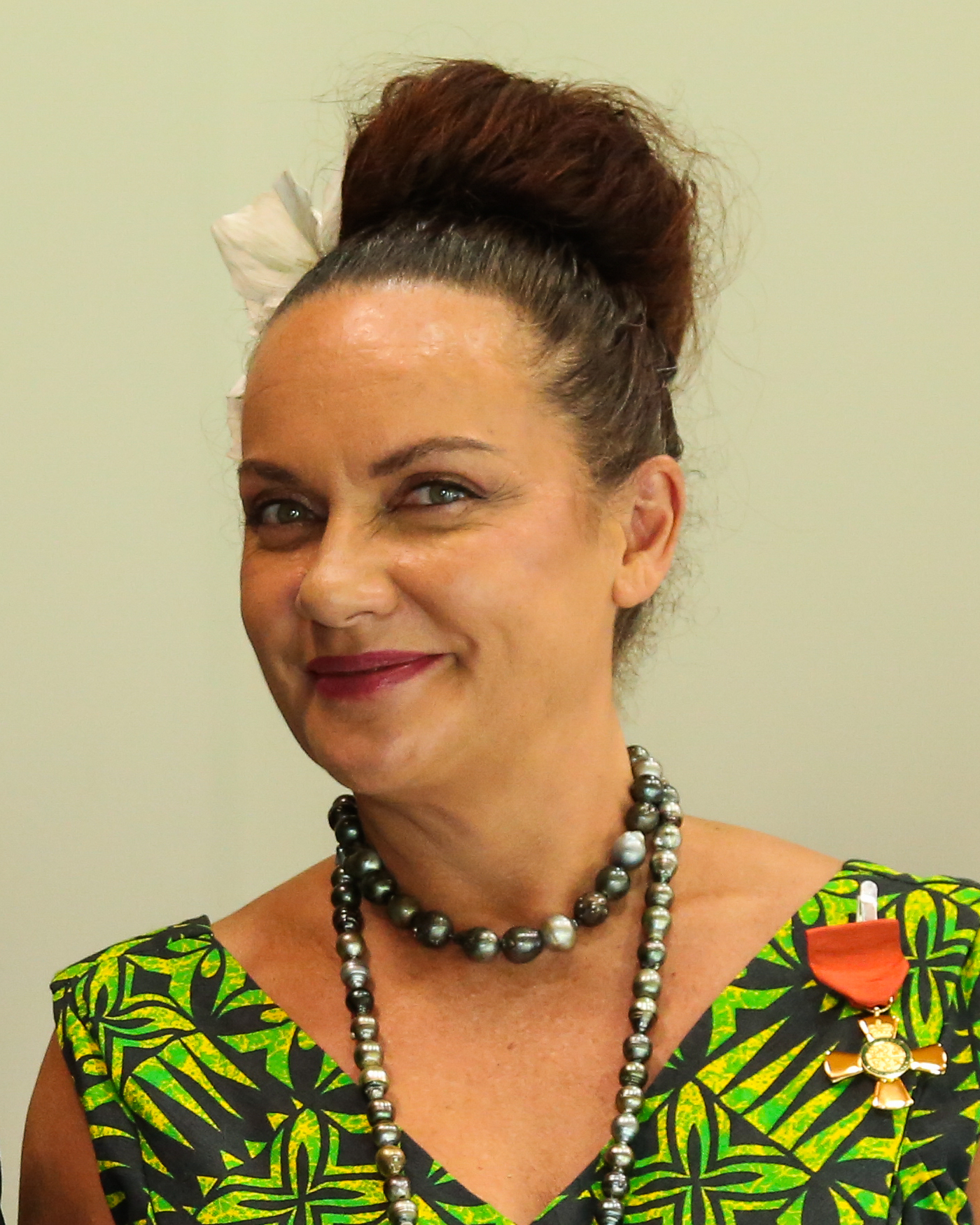
- Taouma in 2023
- Born: Lisa-Jane Taouma
- Education: University of Auckland
- Spouse: Mario Gaoa
- Writing career
- Notable work: Tala Pasifika
- Notable awards: Special Recognition Awards (Arts Pasifika Awards)

Lisa-Jane Taouma ONZM is a Samoan New Zealand writer, film and television director, and producer.

== Background ==
Taouma grew up Faleasiu and Tulaele in Samoa and migrated to Auckland, New Zealand. She has an MA (1st Hons) from the University of Auckland and lectures there on Pacific arts; the title of her 1998 master's thesis was Re-picturing paradise : myths of the dusky maiden.

Taouma is married to fellow writer and comedian Mario Gaoa.

== Career ==
Taouma began writing for the screen in 1996, with two acclaimed short filmsBrown Sugar and Talk of the Town. She began working on Tagata Pasifika as a reporter and senior director.

In 2014 she launched Pasifika online channel Coconet. and produces a number of programmes for television including the popular 'Fresh TV' for TVNZ. In 2018 she made the award winning documentary Marks of Mana winning best documentary at the ImagineNative festival in Toronto 2018, Best Cinematography at DocEdge Festival in Aotearoa, in 2020 she made the award winning feature film anthology 'Teine Sa- The Ancient Ones' and in 2022 the smash hit teen drama film 'Inky Pinky Ponky - The Odd One Out'

Taouma has curated a number of exhibitions and written for scholarly publications on representation of Polynesia in art. In 2002, as part of the Asia Pacific Triennial of Contemporary Art she curated Pasifika Divas, an interdisciplinary performance-based project at the Queensland Art Gallery.

In the 2009 Qantas Film and Television Awards Taouma was nominated in the Best Children's/Youth Programme category for her work on Polyfest '09. Taouma received the Special Recognition Awards at the 2015 Arts Pasifika Awards. In the 2023 New Year Honours, she was appointed an Officer of the New Zealand Order of Merit, for services to Pacific arts and the screen industry.

=== Filmography ===
Year	Title	Role	Notes				
1976–present	Polyfest	Producer, Director	Television				
1987–present	Tagata Pasifika	Director	Television				
1995	Talk of the Town'	Writer	Television/ Short Film				
2001	Otara Market	Director	Television	2003	Masina Samoa: Stories of the Malu	Director	Television
2005	Fa'afafine In Transit – Nothing to Declare	Director	Television				
2008	ASB Polyfest 2008	Producer	Television				
2011–present	Fresh	Producer	Television	2016	Game of Bros	Associate Producer	Television

2017 'Marks of Mana' Director/ Producer Television / Coconet TV

2019 'Untold Pacific History' Series Producer Coconet TV/ RNZ

2020 'Teine Sa-The Ancient Ones' Feature Anthology Television / Film Festival

2022 'Inky Pinky Ponky' Exec Producer Television/ Film Festival

2023 -Untold Pacific History 2' Coconet TV/ RNZ
