= Mohawk Girls =

Mohawk Girls may refer to:

- Mohawk Girls (film), a 2005 documentary
- Mohawk Girls (TV series), a 2014 series based on the film
