= Reel Injun =

2009 Canadian documentary directed by Neil Diamond

- Directed by: Neil Diamond; Catherine Bainbridge; Jeremiah Hayes
- Written by: Neil Diamond; Jeremiah Hayes; Catherine Bainbridge
- Produced by: Catherine Bainbridge; Christina Fon; Linda Ludwick
- Starring: Angela Aleiss; Adam Beach; Clint Eastwood; Sacheen Littlefeather; Zacharias Kunuk; Jim Jarmusch; Robbie Robertson; Russell Means; Melinda Micco; Jesse Wente; Neil Diamond
- Cinematography: Edith Labbé
- Edited by: Jeremiah Hayes
- Music by: Claude Castonguay; Mona Laviolette
- Production companies: Rezolution Pictures; National Film Board of Canada
- Distributed by: Domino Film
- Release dates: September 10, 2009 (Toronto); February 19, 2010 (Canada)
- Running time: 85 minutes
- Country: Canada
- Language: English

Reel Injun is a 2009 Canadian documentary film directed by Cree filmmakers Neil Diamond, Catherine Bainbridge, and Jeremiah Hayes that explores the portrayal of Native Americans in film. Reel Injun is illustrated with excerpts from classic and contemporary portrayals of Native people in Hollywood movies and interviews with filmmakers, actors and film historians, while director Diamond travels across the United States to visit iconic locations in motion picture as well as American Indian history.

Reel Injun explores the various stereotypes about Natives in film, from the noble savage to the drunken Indian. It profiles such figures as Iron Eyes Cody, an Italian American who reinvented himself as a Native American on screen. The film also explores Hollywood's practice of using Italian Americans and American Jews to portray Indians in the movies and reveals how some Native American actors made jokes in their native tongue on screen when the director thought they were simply speaking gibberish.

== Conception ==
The film was inspired, in part, by Neil Diamond's own experiences as a child in Waskaganish, Quebec, where he and other Native children would play cowboys and Indians after local screenings of Westerns in their remote community. Diamond remembers that although the children were Indians, they all wanted to be cowboys. When Diamond was older, he would be questioned by non-Native people about whether his people lived in teepees and rode horses, causing him to realize that their preconceptions about Native people were also derived from movies.

== Interviews ==
Interview subjects include Sacheen Littlefeather, Zacharias Kunuk, Clint Eastwood, Adam Beach, Jim Jarmusch, Robbie Robertson, Russell Means, Wes Studi, and scholars Angela Aleiss and Melinda Micco, and film critic Jesse Wente.

== Locations ==
The documentary is partly structured as a road movie, with Diamond visiting locations across the United States as well as the Canadian North. In the U.S., he is traveling by "rez car," a broken down automobile often used on Indian reserves, as demonstrated in Reel Injun with a sequence from the film Smoke Signals. Locations visited include the Black Hills of South Dakota and Wounded Knee, Camp Nominigue, the Crow Agency in Montana as well as Monument Valley.

== Release ==
In Canada, the film had its world premiere at the Toronto International Film Festival in September 2009, followed by screenings at the ImagineNATIVE Film + Media Arts Festival. Reel Injun began a limited release at theaters in Toronto and Vancouver; it debuted on television on CBC News Network's The Passionate Eye series on March 28, 2010. Reel Injun had its local Montreal premiere at the International Festival of Films on Art, followed by a commercial run at the Cinema du Parc.

In the United States, the film premiered at the SXSW festival in March 2009. It aired on November 2, 2010 on the PBS series Independent Lens. It was screened at the Museum of Modern Art from June 14 to 20, 2010.

== Awards ==
Reel Injun received three awards at the 2010 Gemini Awards: the Canada Award for best multicultural program, Best Direction in a Documentary Program and Elizabeth Klinck and Laura Blaney won for Best Visual Research. It received a Peabody Award for best electronic media in May 2011.

== Credits ==
- Directed by Neil Diamond, Catherine Bainbridge, Jeremiah Hayes
- Written by Neil Diamond, Catherine Bainbridge, Jeremiah Hayes
- Cast: Adam Beach, Clint Eastwood, Chris Eyre, Charlie Hill, Jim Jarmusch, Sacheen Littlefeather, Russell Means, and John Trudell.
- Also featuring Angela Aleiss (author/film historian), Effie and James Atene (Navajo elders who were extras in John Ford films), Andre Dudemaine (Innu film historian), David Kiehn (silent film historian), Zacharias Kunuk, Richard Lamotte ("one of Hollywood's biggest costume designers"), Melinda Micco (Seminole film historian), Robbie Robertson (Mohawk recording artist), Rod Rondeaux (Crow stuntman), Wes Studi (Cherokee actor), and Jesse Wente (Ojibwe film critic).
- Produced by Catherine Bainbridge, Christina Fon, Linda Ludwick, Adam Symansky.
- Executive Producers: Catherine Bainbridge, Ravida Din, Christina Fon, Linda Ludwick, Catherine Olsen, Ernest Webb
- Original Music: Claude Castonguay, Mona Laviolette
- Cinematography: Edith Labbé
- Editor: Jeremiah Hayes
- Post-production supervisor: Tony Manolikakis
- Sound: Lynn Trepanier
- Visual research: Elizabeth Klinck

== The renaissance of Native cinema ==
The documentary mentions the following movies as being part of the "Renaissance of Native cinema"—that is, movies by Native peoples about Native experiences, that "portray Native people as human beings" and depict Native cultures in an authentic way:

- Smoke Signals, 1998
- Dance Me Outside, 1994
- Flags of Our Fathers, 2006
- Atanarjuat -- The Fast Runner, 2001 -- "A film that has revolutionized Native cinema," and "the most Indian movie ever made." (see 1:18)
- Whale Rider, 2002—New Zealand
- Once Were Warriors, 1994—New Zealand
- Skins, 2002
- Ten Canoes, 2006—Australia
- Rabbit Proof Fence, 2002—Australia

Also worth mentioning is a silent film from 1930, The Silent Enemy (a reference to starvation), which this documentary calls "one of the most authentic films of its time, featuring real Native actors" (discussed 19 minutes into this documentary). In this documentary, silent film historian David Kiehn explains that, during the era of silent films, there was a great number of "Native American people directing and acting in films, and they were bringing their viewpoints to the table too. And those were being listened to". But then, according to this documentary, "[I]n the 1930s, [the Hollywood portrayal of] the Indian was transformed into a brutal savage". Film historian Angela Aleiss explains that "[T]here were a number of films that came out in the early 1930s that followed in the steps of The Silent Enemy, and the Indians were the stars of these movies, but... they just bombed at the box office. Americans [were] not that interested in them". The documentary asserts that "America, struggling through the Great Depression, [needed] a new brand of hero". Movies like Stagecoach, which pitted cowboys against Indians and portrayed Native Americans as "vicious and bloodthirsty", became the Hollywood image of Indians until the 1970s.

== Native actors and performers ==
In addition to members of the cast (mentioned above), this documentary mentions the following Native actors and performers who helped to change the way Native peoples are portrayed:

- Charlie Hill—an Oneida-Cree comedian
- Will Sampson—a Muscogee (Creek) actor who played "Chief Bromden" in One Flew Over the Cuckoo's Nest (1975) and "Ten Bears" in The Outlaw Josey Wales (1976)
- Chief Dan George—a Tsleil-Waututh actor and chief of the Tsleil-Waututh Nation who played "Old Lodge Skins" in Little Big Man (1970) and "Lone Watie" in The Outlaw Josey Wales (1976), and many other roles in other films
- Graham Greene—an Oneida actor who played "Kicking Bird" in Dances With Wolves (1990) and "Mogie Yellow Lodge" in Skins (2002), as well as other roles in many other films
- Adam Beach—a Saulteaux actor who played "Frank Fencepost" in Dance Me Outside (1994), "Victor" in Smoke Signals (1998), and "Ira Hayes" in Flags of Our Fathers (2006), among many other films
- Evan Adams—a Coast Salish actor who plays "Thomas Builds-the-Fire" in Smoke Signals (1998), among other films
- Natar Ungalaaq—an Inuk actor who played "Atanarjuat" in Atanarjuat -- The Fast Runner (2001), among other roles in other films
- Rod Rondeaux—a Crow stuntman

Plus:

- Chief Buffalo Child Long Lance—a tri-racial actor who played Baluk in The Silent Enemy (1930)
- Iron Eyes Cody—an Italian-American actor cast as Native American in many films and was the iconic American Indian shedding a tear in the famous "Keep America Beautiful" anti-litter public service advertisement on television in the late 1960s and 1970s.

== See also ==
- Imagining Indians (1992)
- Inventing the Indian (2012)
- Reel Bad Arabs
