= James Bay 1975: The Shock of Two Nations =

- French: Baie James 1975 : le choc des nations
- Directed by: Mélanie Lameboy; Myriam Berthelet; Mathieu Fournier
- Written by: Mélanie Lameboy; Myriam Berthelet; Mathieu Fournier
- Produced by: Marie-Pierre Corriveau; Karine Dubois; Catherine Bainbridge; Archita Ghosh; Daniel Morin
- Cinematography: Van Royko; Maxime Pilon-Lalande
- Edited by: Martin Gagnon
- Production companies: Picbois Productions; Rezolution Pictures
- Release date: November 14, 2025 (Cinemania)
- Running time: 96 minutes
- Country: Canada
- Languages: French; English; Cree

James Bay 1975: The Shock of Two Nations (French: Baie James 1975 : le choc des nations) is a Canadian documentary film, directed by Mélanie Lameboy, Myriam Berthelet and Mathieu Fournier. Released in 2025 to mark the 50th anniversary of the historic James Bay and Northern Quebec Agreement, the film profiles the history of political conflict between the desire of the government of Robert Bourassa to develop hydroelectricity projects in Nord-du-Québec, and the increasing political assertiveness of the region's Cree and Inuit peoples.

The film premiered theatrically at the Cinemania film festival on November 14, 2025, before receiving a television broadcast on Historia the following day. Additional theatrical screenings subsequently took place in November and December at the Cinémathèque québécoise.

The film received a Canadian Screen Award nomination for Best Feature Length Documentary at the 14th Canadian Screen Awards in 2026.
