= Club Native =

- Directed by: Tracey Deer
- Written by: Tracey Deer
- Produced by: Catherine Bainbridge; Christina Fon; Linda Ludwick
- Narrated by: Tracey Deer
- Cinematography: Jeff Dorn
- Edited by: Carl Freed
- Music by: Mona Laviolette; Linda Ludwick
- Release date: October 16, 2008 (Canada)
- Running time: 78 minutes
- Country: Canada
- Language: English

Club Native is a 2008 documentary film by Tracey Deer, exploring Mohawk identity, community and tribal blood quantum laws. The film looks at how women in Deer's home community of Kahnawake risk losing their right to live on the reserve, after marrying non-natives.

The film received the Canada Award from the Academy of Canadian Cinema and Television for best Canadian multi-cultural program and a Gemini Award for best documentary writing. Club Native also received the award for Best Documentary at the Dreamspeakers Festival in Edmonton, the award for Best Canadian Film at the First Peoples' Festival and the Colin Low Award for Best Canadian Documentary at the DOXA Documentary Film Festival. The film was co-produced by Rezolution Pictures and the National Film Board of Canada.
