= Meredith Vuchnich =

Canadian screenwriter

Meredith Vuchnich is a Canadian film and television screenwriter, most noted as cowriter with Tracey Deer of the 2020 film Beans. They won the TIFF-CBC Films Screenwriter Award in 2019 and the WGC Screenwriting Award for Best Feature Film in 2021, and were nominated for a Prix Iris Best Screenplay at the 24th Quebec Cinema Awards in 2022 for this work.

Vuchnich was also a Gemini Award nominee for Best Writing in a Dramatic Series at the 23rd Gemini Awards in 2008 for her work on the television series ReGenesis.

Her other writing credits have included the series Train 48, Godiva's, Wild Roses, The Saddle Club, Remedy, and Carter. She has also had occasional roles as an actress, most notably in a 2001 stage production of Salt-Water Moon and the 2005 film Love Is Work.
