= Brittany LeBorgne =

Canadian actress

Brittany LeBorgne is a Mohawk actress from Canada. She is most noted for her role as Zoe in the television series Mohawk Girls, for which she received a Canadian Screen Award nomination for Best Actress in a Comedy Series at the 4th Canadian Screen Awards in 2016.

Originally from Kahnawake, Quebec, she studied journalism at Concordia University and has been a journalist for the community newspaper The Eastern Door. She is currently based in Montreal.

In addition to Mohawk Girls, LeBorgne has also appeared in the films Rustic Oracle, Beans, The Inhuman (L'Inhumain) and This Place, and has had guest roles in the television series The Bold Type and Street Legal.
