= Tracey Deer =

Kahnawakeronon film director and publisher

Tracey Penelope Tekahentakwa Deer
- Born: February 28, 1978 (age 48); Kahnawake, Quebec, Canada
- Education: Queen of Angels Academy, Dartmouth College

Tracey Penelope Tekahentakwa Deer (born February 28, 1978) is a First Nations (Mohawk) screenwriter, film director and newspaper publisher based in Kahnawake, Quebec. She has written and directed several award-winning documentaries for Rezolution Pictures, an Aboriginal-run film and television production company. In 2008, she was the first Mohawk woman to win a Gemini Award, for her documentary Club Native. Her TV series Mohawk Girls had five seasons from 2014 to 2017. She also founded her own production company for independent short work.

In March 2021, Deer's dramatic film Beans was featured at the New York International Children's Film Festival. Set during the Oka crisis of 1990, which Deer lived through as an adolescent, it stars Kiawenti:io Tarbell (Mohawk), a young actress from Akwesasne.

== Early life and education ==
Tracey Deer was born in 1978 and grew up in a large, close-knit Mohawk family in Kahnawake, a reserve in Quebec, Canada that is south of the St. Lawrence River, across from Montreal. She is a member of the Bear Clan and attended local schools Karonhianhnonha School Elementary and Queen of Angels Academy.

Deer moved to the United States for college, attending Dartmouth College in New Hampshire. She graduated with a degree in film studies.

== Career ==
=== Documentaries ===
- Mohawk Girls (2005)

Deer's first Rezolution/NFB co-production explored the lives of three teenage girls from her reserve. They faced the same decision as she had at their age: to move away and risk losing their rights as Mohawks, or stay and give up the possibilities offered by the outside world. Mohawk Girls received the Alanis Obomsawin Best Documentary Award at the 2005 imagineNATIVE Film + Media Arts Festival.

- One More River: The Deal that Split the Cree (2005)

Deer co-directed One More River: The Deal that Split the Cree. This won the Best Documentary Award at Les Rendez-vous du cinéma québécois and was nominated for Best Social/Political Documentary at the Gemini Awards.

- Kanien'kehá:ka/Living the Language (2008), about the Kanien'kehá:ka language immersion program at Akwesasne, a Mohawk Nation reserve that covers parts of Canada and the US across the St. Lawrence River.
- Club Native (2008)

Deer became the first Mohawk woman to win a Gemini Award, for Club Native, a documentary on Mohawk identity, community, and tribal blood quantum laws. The film received the Academy of Canadian Cinema and Television's Canada Award for best Canadian multi-cultural program, while Deer received another Gemini for best writing. Club Native also received the award for Best Documentary at the Dreamspeakers Festival in Edmonton, the award for Best Canadian Film at the First Peoples' Festival, and the Colin Low Award for Best Canadian Documentary at the DOXA Documentary Film Festival. The film was co-produced by Rezolution Pictures and the National Film Board of Canada.

=== Other film work ===
In 2009, Deer collaborated with Montreal writer Cynthia Knight on Crossing the Line, a live-action 3D short for Digital Nations. This was an NFB and Aboriginal Peoples Television Network joint project, featuring Aboriginal talent at the 2010 Vancouver Olympics.

Deer and Knight also worked together in 2009 on the comedy television pilot Escape Hatch. A spin-off of a short she had directed in 2007, it explores the lives of four young Mohawk women at Kahnawake making their way in the 21st century, including looking for relationships. In 2014 it was picked up as Mohawk Girls (the same as her documentary) and ran for five seasons.

Deer formed her own production company, Mohawk Princess Productions. She wants to produce her own short fiction films.

Her drama film Beans was the winner of the TIFF-CBC Films Screenwriter Award in 2019, and premiered at the 2020 Toronto International Film Festival. Set during the Oka crisis of 1990, it features a young Mohawk girl nicknamed "Beans", played by Kiawaenti:io Tarbell of Akwesasne.

=== TV work ===
In 2014, Deer wrote and produced the first season of Mohawk Girls, adapted from her documentary of the same name. Broadcast on CBC, the show follows the daily lives and struggles of four young women who live in Kahnawake. The fifth and final season was to be completed in 2017.

In 2019, Deer joined the writing room for the third season of the television series Anne with an E, loosely based on the classic book Anne of Green Gables. In that season the writers added an indigenous storyline and new characters. Ka'kwet, a young Mi'kmaq girl, is played by Mohawk actress Kiawenti:io Tarbell. She befriends Anne, and her family members are also part of the season.

== Personal life ==
Deer is married to a non-First Nations person. In April 2017, The Globe and Mail reported that there were rumours that authorities on the First Nations Reserve where Deer lives, and where her hit show is set, had sent her an eviction notice. The Kanahwake membership rules do not allow non-Natives, even spouses, to live on the reserve.

Deer said the rumour was false. She was concerned that she might yet face eviction because of her political activism; she had long opposed the eviction of non-Native spouses from housing on the reserve.
