= Maika Harper =

Canadian Inuk actress and author

Maika Harper is a Canadian Inuk actress and author from Iqaluit, Nunavut. She is known for her roles in the 2014 drama Mohawk Girls and 2025 comedy series North of North.

== Early life ==
Harper was born and raised in the Arctic.

Harper left Iqaluit when she was 14 years old and attended high school at Albert College in Belleville, Ontario. While at the school, she participated in school theater productions.

She briefly studied classical theater at the Bachelor of Fine Arts program at the University of Windsor, and then studied acting for film and television at the Professional Actor's Lab in Toronto.

== Career ==
After attending the University of Windsor, Harper starred in APTN's dramatic comedy, Mohawk Girls. She had guest appearances in the sitcom Kim's Convenience, the legal drama Burden of Truth, and Law and Order Toronto: Criminal Intent.

She is author of the book The Walrus and the Caribou, written in both Inuktitut and English.

== Personal life ==
Harper came out as pansexual in a TikTok video posted on May 2, 2025.

She has two daughters, Eden Lily and Ivy Jo.

== Filmography ==
Year	Title	Role	Notes	Ref
2014–2017	Mohawk Girls	Anna	Main role	
2016–2017	Kim's Convenience	Michaela	3 episodes	
2019	Burden of Truth	Doreen	Episode: "The Milk of Human Kindness"	
2020	Flashback	Tattooed Woman		
2023	Aftercare	Kaatali	Short film	
2024	Law & Order Toronto: Criminal Intent	Detective Shina May	2 episodes	
2025	North of North	Neevee	Main role	
