= TIFF-CBC Films Screenwriter Award =

Annual Canadian film award

The TIFF-CBC Films Screenwriter Award is a Canadian award, jointly presented by the Toronto International Film Festival and the Canadian Broadcasting Corporation to foster the production of new screenplays by emerging filmmakers. The winner of the award receives a $15,000 prize and various mentorship opportunities to assist in the production of their film.

It was previously presented in an independent announcement in the late winter or early spring each year rather than at the festival itself; however, the 2026 announcement took place at TIFF's new film market during the 2026 Toronto International Film Festival.

== Winners ==
Year	Writer	Screenplay	Ref
2017	Jorge Manzano	Strike	
2019	Tracey Deer, Meredith Vuchnich	Beans	
2020	Elyse Friedman	The Relationship Experiment	
2021	Melanie Jones	Switchback	
2022	Boris Rodriguez	Zoila and Andy	
2023	Yasmine Mathurin	Sorry Pardon Madame	
2024	Ariel Nasr	Daudistan	
2025	Lloyd Lee Choi	Yakult Ajumma	
2026	Yuqi Kang	Hatch	
