= Lesley Ann Patten =

American-Canadian filmmaker

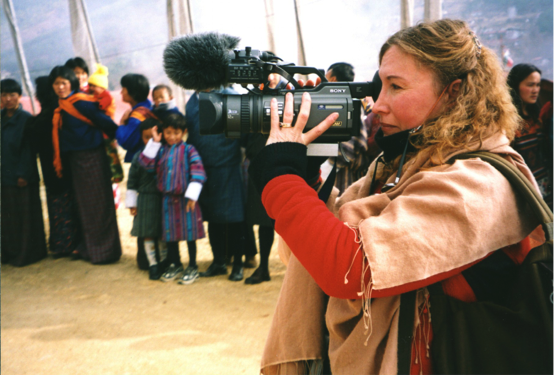
- Occupations: Film director, Screenwriter and Film producer
- Years active: 1988 – Present

Lesley Ann Patten is a film director, screenwriter, and producer whose first feature documentary Loyalties won the 1999 Canada Award.

== Early life ==
Patten grew up in Cleveland, Ohio. She is the granddaughter of Rear Admiral Stanley F. Patten who was the commander of USS Rocky Mount, the flagship of the Pacific Fleet during World War II. She is a graduate of Tufts University located in Medford, Massachusetts. She is a former radio announcer whose on-air career spanned 1978-1984 at WYSP (Philadelphia); WMMR (Philadelphia); WBCN (Boston); WNYC (New York City); and WKTU (New York City).

She moved to Halifax, Nova Scotia, Canada in 1991. She formed ZIJI Film & Television Limited in 1999. The company produces films directed and written by Ms. Patten.

== Career ==
Patten directed her first documentary in 1988. Dancemaker: Judith Jamison was commissioned by WHYY-TV, Philadelphia and broadcast nationally on PBS. In 1990-91, she wrote and directed investigative magazine pieces for The Real Story, a national magazine show on CNBC Network News hosted by Cassandra Clayton and Boyd Matson.

Her first feature-length documentary, Loyalties, won the Canada Award in 1999. She is best known for her feature-length documentary, Words Of My Perfect Teacher, featuring Dzongsar Jamyang Khyentse Rinpoche.

== Film making ==
Patten has writer/director credits for Dancemaker (1988), a documentary on Judith Jamison, Loyalties (1999), documentary, The Voice Set Free (2000), Word Of My Perfect Teacher (2005), and Regarding: Cohen (2006). She is the screenwriter for three films that are in development, including The Book of Secrets, Tales From The Kingdom, and Te Juro. She acted as producer on Warrior Songs (1997) and Generation XXL (2008).

=== Dancemaker: Judith Jamison (1989) ===
Dancemaker: Judith Jamison is a documentary for PBS, commissioned by WHYY-TV, Philadelphia. It is the only cinema verite documentary of Judith Jamison ever made. The film follows her working with young dancers in Philadelphia on a performance of her own choreography.

=== Warrior Songs, King Gesar (1997) ===
The legendary Tibetan warrior-king, Gesar of Ling, is brought to life in this sweeping operatic interpretation of an ancient Asian saga. Featuring performances by Yo-Yo Ma and Peter Serkin. Warrior Songs blends eloquent musicianship, fierce horseback riding, dance and storytelling to recount the deeds of Gesar, the enlightened sage, as he battles the demons that threaten to enslave humanity. The composer was Peter Lieberson. Warrior Songs was nominated for Best Performance film, Banff Mountain Film Festival in 1997.

=== Loyalties (1999) ===
Beneath the dense foliage of the plantations, in the sweltering hear of white patronage and black forbearance, the two women, each in her own way, come to terms with the thunderous cruelty of slavery. Featuring authors Ruth Holmes Whitehead and Carmelita Robertson. Filmed in South Carolina and Nova Scotia.

=== The Voice Set Free (2000) ===
The story of Jo-Ann Mayhew, an upper middle class woman who, in an alcoholic haze, shot and killed her husband and woke up stone-cold sober for the first time in twenty years, in the Prison For Women in Kingston, Ontario. Mayhew became a human rights activist for prisoners, and eventually finished her sentence in the Okimaw Ohci Healing Lodge, a prison in theory run by tribal elders in Saskatchewan. Her sentence was commuted. Mayhew shortly thereafter died from ALS. CTV Network, Canada; Vision TV.

=== Words Of My Perfect Teacher (2003) ===
From the World Cup to the mythical mountain kingdom of Bhutan, Words Of My Perfect Teacher is a documentary about the challenging aspects of the student-teacher relationship in Vajrayana Buddhism. The title comes from Patrul Rinpoche's famous text of the same name. The "perfect teacher" of the film is Dzongsar Jamyang Khyentse Rinpoche, an eminent Buddhist and acclaimed film director. (The Cup (1999 film);Travelers and Magicians.) Guest appearances include Steven Seagal and Bernardo Bertolucci.

French versioning (2005); Spanish versioning (2009); Chinese versioning (2012)

=== Cohen's War (2005) ===
CBC Network. An hour-long portrait of Canadian immigration lawyer, M. Lee Cohen, renowned for his work with refugees. The film follows his representation of Sonya Pecelj and Vladimir Zalipyatskikh. The first case follows a young woman, Sonya Pecelj from Kosovo, who seeks sanctuary for more than a year in a church; the second case follows a Russian sailor who dives off a ship in Halifax Harbour to escape virtual imprisonment by the Russian fish mafia.

=== Regarding Cohen ===
The feature length, complete version of the documentary portrait of Canadian immigration lawyer M. Lee Cohen. The film ends with Vladimir Zalipyatskikh being deported. Zalipyatskikh was granted re-entry and landed immigrant status in 2010.

== Awards and honors ==
- 1997: Banff Rockie Award nomination, Best Performance Film for "Warrior Songs".
- 1999: Canada Award for Loyalties.
- 1999: Hot Docs, Best Social Issue Film for Loyalties.
- 2000: Yorkton Film Festival Golden Sheaf Award for Loyalties.
- 2000: American Film Festival, Best 10 Documentaries of 2000 for Loyalties.
- 2000: Gemini Award, Best Direction of a Documentary for "The Voice Set Free".
- 2008: CFTPA Indie Award.
- 2008: Francis Ford Coppola Screenplay Contest, Semi-finalist.
- 2008: International Family Film Festival, Hollywood for Best Documentary Short, 2008.
- 2008: Gemini Award nomination.
- 2008: Students Choice Award, Sprockets Toronto International Film Festival for Children.
- 2008: Best Documentary Award from ViewFinders: International Film Festival for Youth.
