= This Place (film) =

2022 Canadian film directed by V. T. Nayani

- Directed by: V. T. Nayani
- Written by: Golshan Abdmoulaie; Devery Jacobs; V.T. Nayani
- Produced by: Stephanie Sonny Hooker
- Starring: Devery Jacobs; Priya Guns
- Cinematography: Conor Fisher
- Edited by: Maureen Grant
- Music by: Kalaisan Kalaichelvan
- Production companies: Hometeam Films; Mutuals Pictures
- Release date: September 9, 2022 (TIFF)
- Running time: 87 minutes
- Country: Canada
- Languages: English; Mohawk; Tamil

This Place is a Canadian drama film, directed by V. T. Nayani and released in 2022. The film stars Devery Jacobs and Priya Guns as Kawenniióhstha and Malai, two young queer women who fall in love while both confronting family difficulties: Kawenniióhstha is searching for her estranged Iranian father, while Malai's father is seriously ill.

The cast also includes Janïsa Weekes, Alex Joseph, Brittany LeBorgne, Ali Momen, Muraly Srinarayanathas, Jahmal Padmore, Golshan Abdmoulaie, Abi Jeyaratnam, Mecha Clarke, Feaven Abera, Ali Badshah, and Darianne Breault.

The film had its world premiere in the Discovery section at the 2022 Toronto International Film Festival on September 9, 2022. It went into commercial release in July 2023.

== Cast ==
- Devery Jacobs as Kawenniióhstha Cross
- Priya Guns as Malai Jeyapillai
- Brittany LeBorgne as Wari Cross
- Ali Momen as Behrooz Asadi
- Alex Joseph as Ahrun Jeyapillai
- Janisa Weekes as Dr. Helen Campbell
- Muraly Srinarayanathas as Jeyapillai Chinniah
- Jahmal Padmore as Dwayne Francis
- Darianne Breault as Donna Asadi

== Critical response ==
Courtney Small of That Shelf wrote that "The notion of learning to forgive adds a fascinating layer to Nayani’s film. It allows the film to work as both an engaging romance, and a profound exploration of the intersection of family, community, and identity. Just as Kawenniióhstha and Malai are figuring out who they are both as individuals and a couple, they are also coming to terms with the difficult decisions their families were forced to make."

Drew Gregory of Autostraddle wrote: "All of these threads of story are balanced deftly, always grounded in the people, the cultures, the places, and the time periods on display."

Tomas Trussow of The Lonely Critic wrote: "The battle to preserve connections of all kinds becomes the shaping tenet of Nayani’s work, which is engrained in all facets of the film’s makeup ... allowing viewers to see how fully and freely these characters live out their roots in the moment."
