= Melinda Micco =

American educator (1947–2021)

- Born: Melinda Beth Coker; December 21, 1947; Richmond, California
- Died: December 5, 2021 (aged 73); Oakland, California
- Occupations: College professor, filmmaker, scholar, activist

Melinda Beth Coker Micco (December 21, 1947 – December 5, 2021) was an American filmmaker, scholar, activist, and educator. She was a professor of ethnic studies at Mills College, and the first Native American woman to earn tenure at Mills.

== Early life ==
Melinda Beth Coker was born in Richmond, California, one of the four daughters of Harry Coker and Frankie Wilson Coker. She had Seminole, Choctaw, and Creek (Muscogee) family origins, and was a registered member of the Seminole Nation of Oklahoma. She graduated from Aragon High School in San Mateo, California in 1966. Later, as a single mother in her forties, she earned a BA in 1990, an MA in 1992, and a PhD in ethnic studies in 1995, all from the University of California at Berkeley. Her dissertation was titled "Freedmen and Seminoles: Forging a Seminole Nation".

== Career ==
Micco joined the faculty of Mills College in 1993, and became chair of the Ethnic Studies department in 1994. Also in 1994, she was the first Native American woman to earn tenure at Mills College. She taught ethnic studies courses at Mills, and spoke on Native American identity issues nationally. She retired from Mills College in 2018.

In 2018 Micco spoke at the Global Climate Action Summit in San Francisco. In 2019 she spoke at a Berkeley rally against immigrant detention centers. She was founder of the Brave Hearted Women Conference, and one of the founders of Idle No More SF Bay, an environmental justice project led by indigenous women elders. She was also active in the Intertribal Friendship House in Oakland, California.

Micco produced the documentaries Killing the 7th Generation: Reproductive Abuses against Indigenous Women, with Diné Navajo educator Esther Lucero, and Every Step A Prayer: Refinery Corridor Healing Walks, with Chihiro Wimbush. She appeared in the Canadian documentary Reel Injun (2006), on film depictions of Native Americans.

== Publications ==
- "African Americans and American Indians" (encyclopedia entry, 1996)
- "Tribal Re-Creations: Buffalo Child Long Lance and Black Seminole Narratives" (chapter, 2000)
- "Seminoles and Black Seminoles in Contemporary Tribal Politics" (symposium contribution, 2000)
- “Blood and Money: The Case of Seminole Freedmen and Seminole Indians in Oklahoma” (chapter, 2006)

== Personal life ==
Micco married and divorced, and had two children. She died in 2021, in Oakland, California, at age 73.
