= Neil Diamond (filmmaker) =

Cree-Canadian filmmaker

Neil Diamond is a Cree-Canadian filmmaker born and raised in Waskaganish, Quebec. Working with Rezolution Pictures, Diamond has directed the documentary films Reel Injun, The Last Explorer, One More River, Heavy Metal: A Mining Disaster in Northern Quebec and Cree Spoken Here, along with three seasons of DAB IYIYUU, a series for the Aboriginal Peoples Television Network about Cree elders.

In the 2008 docudrama The Last Explorer, Diamond explored the story of his great-uncle George Elson, a Cree guide who helped to map Labrador as part of an ill-fated 1903 expedition with Leonidas Hubbard and Dillon Wallace, and a return voyage in 1905 with Hubbard's widow Mina Hubbard.

As of April 2011, Diamond is developing a project with Inuk filmmaker Zacharias Kunuk about the 18th-century conflict between Cree and Inuit, which lasted almost a century.

He codirected, with Catherine Bainbridge, and starred in the 2024 documentary Red Fever, about cultural appropriation and the Western world's pop culture fascination with the stereotypical imagery of Indigenous people. Later in the same year he also premiered So Surreal: Behind the Masks, a documentary co-directed with Joanne Robertson exploring the influence of traditional indigenous masks on artistic surrealism.

== Reel Injun ==
Reel Injun was inspired by Diamond's own experiences as a child in Waskaganish, where he and other Native children would play cowboys and Indians after local screenings of Westerns in their remote community. Diamond remembers that although the children were in fact "Indians", they all wanted to be the cowboys. Afterwards, when he was old enough to move south to study, he would be questioned by non-Native people about whether his people lived in teepees and rode horses, causing Diamond to realize that their preconceptions about Native people were also derived from movies. These stereotypes motivated him to help America see the true identity of what a Native American was.

== Awards ==
Diamond received the award for Best Direction in a Documentary Program at the 2010 Gemini Awards for Reel Injun. It also earned him a 2011 Peabody Award.
