= Rainbow Dickerson =

American actress

- Years active: 2016-Present

Rainbow Dickerson is an American actress of self-identified Thai and Rappahannock descent.

She is most noted for her performance as Lily in the 2020 film Beans, for which she won the Vancouver Film Critics Circle award for Best Supporting Actress in a Canadian Film in 2020. Dickerson was also named one of four Rising Stars at the 2020 Toronto International Film Festival.

== Career ==
In 2009, Dickerson starred in Florida Studio Theatre's production of José Rivera's Boleros for the Disenchanted. In 2019, she played Bianca in the A.R.T.'s production of Othello.

== Filmography ==
=== Film ===
| Year | Title | Role | Notes |
|---|---|---|---|
| 2020 | Beans | Lily | |
| TBA | Potential | Kira | |

=== Television ===
| Year | Title | Role | Notes |
|---|---|---|---|
| 2016 | Banshee | Tocho's Mom | Episode: "Innocent Might Be a Bit of a Stretch" |
| 2016 | Chicago Fire | Liz Brexel | Episode: "The Last One for Mom" |
| 2018 | Gone | Fiona Gardner | Episode: "Exigent Circumstances" |
| 2019 | The Patron | Emma Jarit | Television film |
| 2024 | Avatar: The Last Airbender | Kya | 2 episodes |
