= Catherine Bainbridge =

Canadian director, writer, and producer

Catherine Bainbridge is a Canadian director, writer, and producer. She co-founded Rezolution Pictures, a Montreal-based film and television production company focusing primarily on Canadian Aboriginal productions, with director/writer/producer Ernest Webb in 2001.

Bainbridge and Alfonso Maiorana wrote and directed Rumble: The Indians Who Rocked the World to highlight the role of Indigenous artists in American music history.

With Cree filmmaker Neil Diamond she codirected the award-winning 2009 documentary Reel Injun, about the portrayal of Native Americans in movies, and the 2024 documentary Red Fever, about cultural appropriation and the Western world's pop culture fascination with the stereotypical imagery of Indigenous people.

== Filmography ==
Year	Film	Director	Producer	Writer	Awards and Nominations	Notes
2004	One More River: The Deal That Split the Cree		Yes			Documentary
2004	Heavy Metal: A Mining Disaster in Northern Quebec		Yes	Yes		Documentary
2007	Mommy, Mommy		Yes	Yes		TV movie documentary
2007	Moose TV		Yes			TV series
2008	Club Native		Yes			Documentary
2009	The Last Explorer			Yes		Documentary
2009	Reel Injun	Yes	Yes	Yes	Won - Gemini Award for Best Direction in a Documentary Program, Canada Award (2009) Nominated - Gemini Award - Donald Brittain Award (2010)	Documentary
2010	Down the Mighty River		Yes	Yes		TV mini-series Documentary
2010	Independent Lens	Yes	Yes	Yes		TV series documentary
2011	Working It Out Together		Yes			TV series documentary
2012	Smoke Traders	Yes	Yes	Yes		Documentary
2013	Indians + Aliens I			Yes		TV series documentary
2014	Working It Out Together II		Yes			TV series documentary
2014	The Wolverine: The Fight of the James Bay Cree		Yes			Documentary Short
2015	The Oka Legacy		Yes			Documentary
2016	Butterhead's Guide to the Galaxy		Yes			TV mini-series
2017	Rumble: The Indians Who Rocked the World	Yes	Yes		Won - Biograflim Festival Audience Award for Biografilm Music (2017) Won - Boulder International Film Festival Best Music Documentary (2017) Won - Hot Docs Canadian International Documentary Festival Audience Award, Best Documentary (2017) Won - Sundance Film Festival Special Jury Prize in Masterful Storytelling for World Cinema - Documentary (2017) Nominated - Sydney Film Festival Audience Award for Best Documentary (2017) Nominated - Thessaloniki Documentary Film Festival Golden Alexander in International Competition (2017) Nominated - Cleveland International Film Festival Music Movies Competition (2017)	Documentary
2010 - 2017	Mohawk Girls	Yes	Yes		Nominated - Canadian Screen Award for Best Comedy Series (2010, 2016)	TV series
2024	Red Fever	Yes	Yes			Codirected with Neil Diamond
