= Loyalties (1999 film) =

Loyalties is a 1999 Canadian documentary film directed by Lesley Ann Patten about two women—one white, one black—who discover that they are related due to the legacy of slavery in the United States. In 1995, Dr. Ruth Whitehead of the Nova Scotia Museum of Natural History in Halifax met Black Canadian graduate student Carmelita Robertson, who happened to mention that her relatives came to Nova Scotia from South Carolina as Black Loyalists in the late 18th century. Whitehead, whose own family also came from South Carolina, realized that she recognized some of the names of Robertson's ancestors, and together the two women journey to Charleston, South Carolina to explore their shared past. The film also exposes strains in the personal relationship between the two women, with Whitehead descended from wealthy slave owners, and Robertson the descendant of their slaves.

Loyalties is co-produced by the National Film Board of Canada and ZIJI Film & Television Productions.

== Awards ==
In 1999, Loyalties received the Canada Award from the Academy of Canadian Cinema and Television and was named Best Social Issue documentary at Hot Docs. The following year, it received the Golden Sheaf Award in the category of Best Multicultural/Race Relations documentary.
