= Flashback (2020 film) =

2020 Canadian mystery thriller film

- Film poster with original title
- Directed by: Christopher MacBride
- Written by: Christopher MacBride
- Produced by: Lee Kim
- Starring: Dylan O'Brien; Hannah Gross; Emory Cohen; Keir Gilchrist; Maika Monroe
- Cinematography: Brendan Steacy
- Edited by: Matt Lyon
- Music by: Pilotpriest
- Production companies: Resolute Films; Addictive Pictures
- Distributed by: Lionsgate
- Release dates: October 8, 2020 (Sitges Film Festival); June 4, 2021 (Canada)
- Running time: 97 minutes
- Country: Canada
- Language: English

Flashback, alternatively titled The Education of Fredrick Fitzell, is a 2020 Canadian mystery thriller film written and directed by Christopher MacBride. The film stars Dylan O'Brien, Hannah Gross and Maika Monroe. The film premiered at the 2020 Sitges Film Festival.

== Plot ==
Fred Fitzell and his wife Karen visit Fred's mother in a hospital where she is suffering from severe mental decline. Fred works in an office job but begins to get vivid flashbacks of high school. He remembers a girl named Cindy Williams and visits the high school and asks a librarian about her. The librarian tells Fred that Cindy went missing after a drug went around the school. Fred gets more flashbacks and is accosted by a scarred homeless person in his car while he is parked in an alley.

Fred begins to have memories of a child who walked past him in high school who looks like the homeless person. Fred has disparate memories of the child and the homeless person in which they say a single word; when Fred pieces these words together, they combine to say "I'm/in/your/lobby." Fred visits his apartment lobby with a baseball bat and is surprised by the homeless person. Fred sees various visions of a mouth and of being on the floor looked at by Cindy and others. He awakens after having had a mental breakdown in the lobby.

Fred reconnects with his friends from high school and continues to have more flashbacks. He has memories of doing a drug called mercury (or merc) in his high school's boiler room and of visiting a club to get "uncut merc". Near the club, Fred and Cindy talk on a roof about how the drug releases people from being trapped. In the present, Fred is having difficulty at work and needs to deliver a presentation. With his high school friends, he visits the now-abandoned club in an attempt to find out what happened. At the club, Fred begins to have flashbacks of taking uncut merc in high school. He finds homeless squatters, including the scarred man from earlier, and he finds Cindy. They tell him he never left. Fred flashes back between the homeless person and the child, who back in high school took high amounts of merc. He also sees visions of the mouth and people looking over him.

Fred pieces together a series of words from memories of the homeless person and the child which tells him that there is an invasive lifeform that forces people to perceive time linearly (as a way to control them by seeing their outcomes as inescapable) and that the drug allows people to temporarily break free of this and see all temporal possibilities. Fred realizes that back in high school he had bad reaction to the merc and took a lamp and hit the child in the face, scarring his face. Fred wakes up in bed in the present day and realizes he has little time to finish the presentation for work. When he begins his presentation, he sees himself back in high school, where he is taking a final exam. He has a simultaneous breakdown in the past and present.

Realizing that he can travel through multiple timelines, Fred flashes back to Cindy at the abandoned club. The two fall in love and live many lives together and travel to many different places, such as the Middle East and a Mediterranean villa. Eventually the two wake up in the present day at the abandoned club. Fred realizes that he can no longer travel with Cindy and travels back to the final exam, on which he does well. He meets his wife after the exam and does well on the presentation at his office job, ultimately leading to him and his wife buying a house.

Fred finally reconnects with his mother at the hospital and realizes the vision of a mouth he keeps seeing is of his mother yelling at him as an infant when he almost fell down a staircase. His mother has a moment of lucidity and remembers who Fred is, and the two briefly connect. However, his mother dies shortly afterwards.

== Cast ==
- Dylan O'Brien as Fred
- Hannah Gross as Karen
- Emory Cohen as Sebastian
- Keir Gilchrist as Andre
- Maika Monroe as Cindy
- Liisa Repo-Martell as Mrs. Fitzell
- Amanda Brugel as Evelyn
- Alan C. Peterson as Mr. MacDonald
- Aaron Poole as pierced man
- Maika Harper as tattooed woman
- Ian Matthews as horned man

== Production ==
In May 2018, it was announced that Dylan O'Brien, Maika Monroe, and Hannah Gross were set to star in the film, which is written and directed by Christopher MacBride. In September 2018, Amanda Brugel, Emory Cohen, and Keir Gilchrist joined the film in supporting roles.

Principal photography took place in Toronto between September 24, 2018, and October 2018.

The original soundtrack was composed by the artist Anthony Scott Burns.

== Release ==
On April 13, 2021, it was announced that the film would release in select theaters and on video-on-demand services on June 4 of the same year, with a DVD and Blu-ray release to follow on June 8.

== Critical reception ==
On Rotten Tomatoes, the film has an approval rating of 55% based on 33 reviews, with an average rating of 5.9/10. On Metacritic, the film holds a score of 49 out of 100 from 4 reviews, indicating "mixed or average reviews".

Dennis Harvey of Variety praised the film for creating a "Christopher Nolan–esque, fantasy-tinged narrative puzzle" without the need for a major studio budget or elaborate CGI effects. He also noted that while the narrative complexity is engaging and well-crafted, some viewers may feel that style outweighs substance, and that the characters "have so little context or inner life that they might as well be named Protagonist, Mystery Obsession Girl, Sidekicks 1 & 2, Obligatory Girlfriend, and Mom". Harvey further highlighted Dylan O'Brien's empathetic performance and the film's strong visual and musical presentation. Glenn Kenny of RogerEbert.com emphasized the ambitious themes of the film, which explores the nature of time, fate, and existence itself, but criticized the main character, saying he is "mopey and uninteresting from frame one" and that some of MacBride's narrative attempts "just don't quite work". Nevertheless, Kenny acknowledged that the film cannot be denied credit for its ambition in exploring complex temporal structures.
