= Academy of Canadian Cinema and Television Diversity Award =

Canadian film and TV diversity award

The Diversity Award was a special award presented by Academy of Canadian Cinema and Television to honour excellence in English-language television programming that reflects the racial and cultural diversity of Canada". It was introduced in 1988 as the Multiculturalism Award under the umbrella of the Gemini Awards, and renamed to the Canada Award in 1993. The winner of the award was generally announced in advance of the ceremony, although the award was presented to the producers at the ceremony.

It was renamed to the Diversity Award in 2014 after the Geminis were merged into the Canadian Screen Awards. It has not been presented since the 4th Canadian Screen Awards in 2016.

National Film Board of Canada productions and co-productions have won approximately half of all Canada Awards.

== Winners by year ==
Year	Program	Producers	Ref
1988	Degrassi Junior High	Kit Hood, Linda Schuyler	
1989	Inside Stories	Paul de Silva	
1990	Batiya Bak!	Werner Volkmer	
1992	Drums	Pnina Bloch, Jennifer Campbell, Andy Blicq	
1993	It's About Time	Peter Flemington, Rita Deverell	
1994	Speak It! From the Heart of Black Nova Scotia	Mike Mahoney, Sylvia Hamilton	
1995	For Angela	Nancy Trites Botkin, Joe MacDonald	
1996	Nuhoniyeh: Our Story	Allan Code, Mary Code	
1997	The Mind of a Child	Gary Marcuse	
1998 (1)	The Road Taken	Selwyn Jacob, Dale Phillips	
1998 (2)	The Rez: "They Call Her Tanya"	Brian Dennis	
1999	Loyalties	Lesley Ann Patten	
2000	Unwanted Soldiers	Karen King	
2001	Made in China: The Story of Adopted Chinese Children in Canada	Karen Lee, Shan Tam	
2002	Film Club	Cyrus Sundar Singh	
2003	Carry Me Home: The Story & Music of the Nathaniel Dett Chorale	Liam Romalis	
2004	Cosmic Current	Anand Ramayya	
2005	Two Worlds Colliding	Tasha Hubbard, Bonnie Thompson	
2006	Wapos Bay: "There's No I in Hockey"	Michael J. F. Scott, Anand Ramayya, Melanie Jackson, Dennis Jackson	
2007	Little Mosque on the Prairie	Zarqa Nawaz, Mary Darling, Clark Donnelly, Susan Alexander, Michael Snook	
2008	Qallunaat! Why White People Are Funny	Mark Sandiford, Kent Martin	
2009	Club Native	Catherine Bainbridge, Christina Fon, Linda Ludwick	
2010	Reel Injun	Catherine Bainbridge, Christina Fon, Linda Ludwick	
2011	The Storytelling Class	John Paskievich, John Whiteway	
2013	Blind Spot: What Happened to Canada's Aboriginal Fathers?	Geoff Leo	
2014	The Defector: Escape from North Korea	Ann Shin	
2015	The Exhibition	Damon Vignale, Miho Yamamoto	
2016	Canada in Perspective	Anne Marie Varner	

== See also ==
- Canadian television awards
