= Rosebud Yellow Robe =

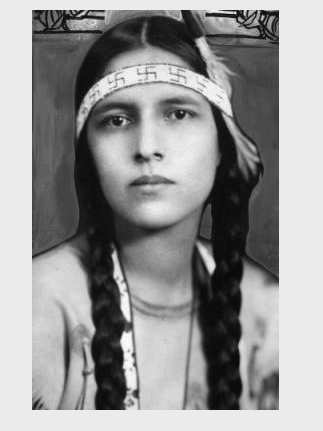
- circa 1927
- Born: 26 February 1907; Rapid City, South Dakota
- Died: 5 October 1992 (aged 85)
- Other name: Lacotawin
- Known for: Folklorist, educator and author
- Parent(s): Chauncey Yellow Robe (father); Lillian Belle Springer (mother)
- Family: Chauncina and Evelyn (sisters)

Rosebud Yellow Robe (Lacotawin) (26 February 1907 – 5 October 1992) was an American folklorist, educator and writer of half Lakota Sioux birth. Rosebud was influenced by her father Chauncey Yellow Robe, and used storytelling, performance and books to introduce generations of children to Native American folklore and culture.

Rosebud was a public celebrity to thousands of children who visited the Indian Village at Jones Beach, New York, every summer from 1930 to 1950. From the late 1930s through the 1950s, Yellow Robe was a broadcast celebrity with the CBS Broadcast Center in New York City and appeared as a regular on NBC children's programs.

In later years, Rosebud continued her storytelling and lectures at the American Museum of Natural History and the Donnell Library of New York.

In 1994, Yellow Robe's career as an educator was honored in a performance of "Rosebud's Song" by the National Dance Institute at New York City's Madison Square Garden.

== Early life and education ==
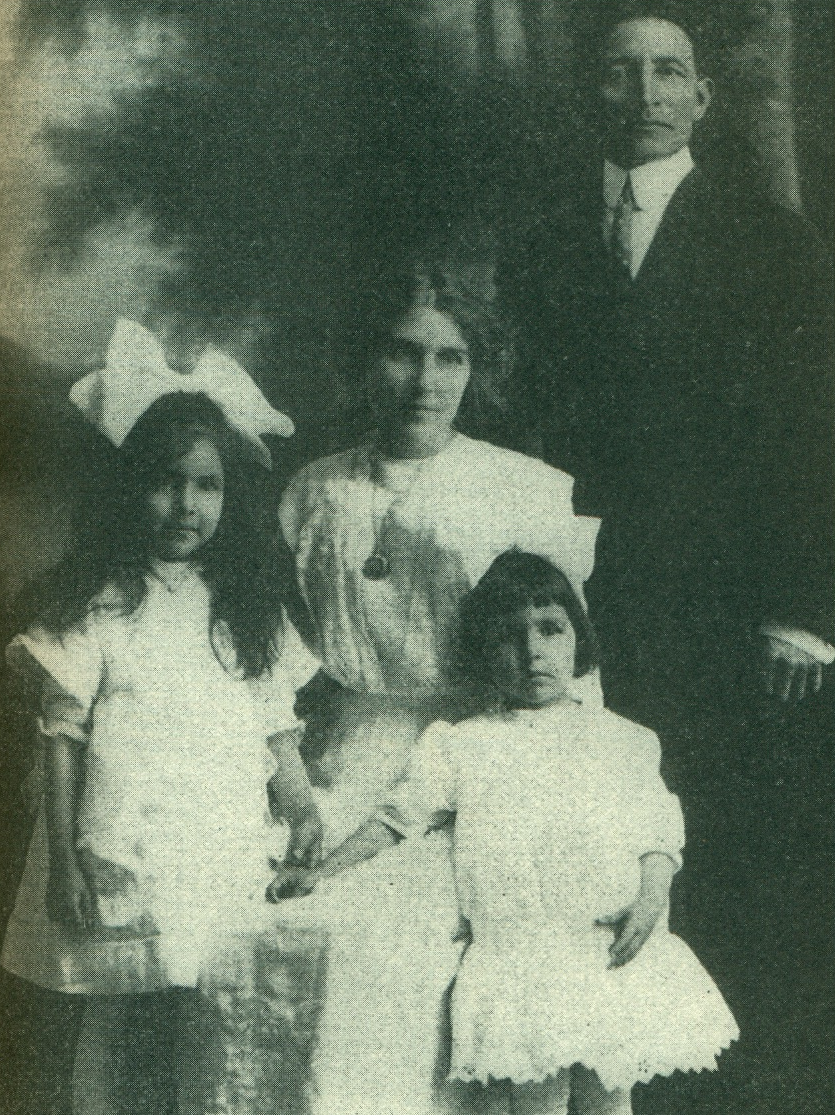
Chauncey Yellow Robe and family, 1915. Left to right: Rosebud, Lillie, Chauncina and Chauncey

Rosebud Yellow Robe was born on 26 February 1907, in Rapid City, South Dakota, the eldest of three daughters of Chauncey Yellow Robe and Lillian Belle Sprenger. Rosebud was named after the Rosebud Indian Reservation in South Dakota. Chauncey Yellow Robe ("Kills in the Woods") (Canowicakte) was a well known educator, lecturer and Native American activist. In 1905, Yellow Robe married Lillian Belle Sprenger, of Swiss-German ancestry from Tacoma, Washington. Lillian was a volunteer nurse at the Rapid City Indian School. "Lillie" was born in Minnesota in 1885 and moved with her family to Tacoma, Washington, where she was reared and went to school. Her family had emigrated to the U.S. from the German-speaking city of Neftenbach, Switzerland, in 1854. The Rapid City Indian School was created in 1898 for Indian children from the Northern plains, including those from the Sioux, Northern Cheyenne, Shoshone, Arapaho, Crow, and Flathead tribes. It was one of the off-reservation Indian Boarding Schools established by the Bureau of Indian Affairs and was sometimes called "School of the Hills." It closed its doors as a school in 1933 and became a sanatorium for the treatment of tuberculosis for the Sioux.

Her parents' marriage was an inspiration for Rosebud's ability to cross cultural bridges. Chauncey taught her and her sisters Chauncina (Note: Chauncina Yellow Robe (28 January 1909 – June 13, 1981), also went into show business and traveled with rodeos and circuses, worked in selling advertising for the Yellow Pages. Later, she became a spokesperson for the Chicago Indian community and worked at the Chicago Indian Health Service. Chauncina inspired the establishment of the American Indian Oral History Project at the Newberry Library. Chauncina is buried at Saint Agnes Catholic Cemetery (Manderson), Shannon County, South Dakota.) and Evelyn (Note: Evelyn Y. Robe Finkbeiner, (25 December 1919– ) graduated magna cum laude Mount Holyoke College, completing her PhD at Northwestern University, in speech pathology. She served on the faculty Mount Holyoke and Vassar College. Evelyn was a Fulbright scholar and eventually settled in Germany with her husband, Dr. Hans Finkbeiner, an obstetrician and gynecologist.) in Lakota tradition. On occasion, elderly Indians would visit the grounds of the Indian School and tell stories in the Lakota language. Chauncey would have Rosebud listen, even though she could not understand a word, and later he would retell the stories in English. Chauncey chose to send his daughters to the Rapid City public schools for their academic orientation, instead of the Indian School which focused on vocational courses in agriculture, blacksmithing and domestic arts. Rosebud enjoyed the Indian School's library and programs. Chauncey spent many hours with his children telling the tales he was told by his grandmother and grandfather. (Note: “Canowicakte spent many hours in the tipi of his grandfather and grandmother. They were his tutors in legends and history of the tribe. He was expected to memorize all these stories so that he in turn would be able to relate them to his children. He was taught respect and reverence for Wakan-tanka, the Great Mystery. He learned of the great and inspiring deeds of the famous chiefs, warriors and medicine men. He was trained in the old customs of how to make bows and arrows for hunting and for wars. He learned how to hunt deer and buffalo. He enjoyed wrestling, swimming and foot racing with his companions.")

Rosebud Yellow Robe was one of the first Native American students at the University of South Dakota in Vermillion, South Dakota. Rosebud attended the university from 1925 to 1927, and took part in productions and presentations about Native American dances. On 6 April 1927, Rosebud's mother Lillie died at the age of forty-two, in Chauncey's words, "in the prime of her life and beautiful womanhood." Rosebud was prompted her to take over the care of her two younger sisters.

== U.S. President Calvin Coolidge ==
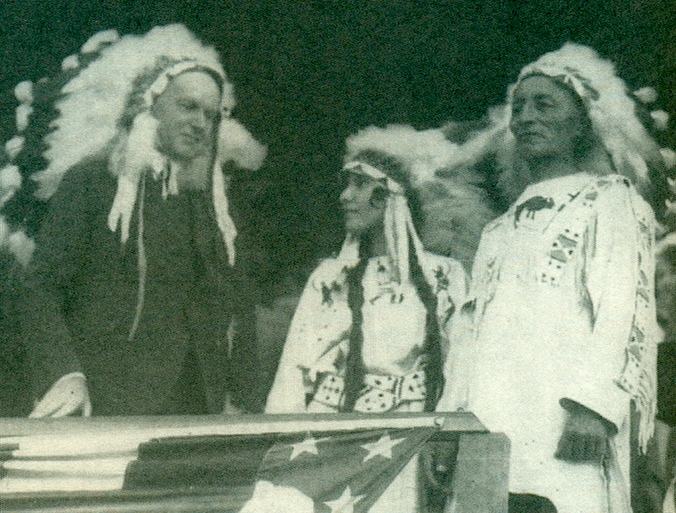
President Calvin Coolidge, Yellow Robe, and her father Chauncey Yellow Robe in 1927

On 4 August 1927, U.S. President Calvin Coolidge and his wife visited the Black Hills of South Dakota. During the visit, Coolidge was adopted as an honorary member of the Sioux tribe in recognition of his support for the Indian Citizenship Act of 1924, granting full U.S. citizenship to all American Indians and permitting them to retain tribal land and cultural rights. The ceremony was presided over by Chief Chauncey Yellow Robe and Rosebud. Chauncey conferred upon President Coolidge the name "Leading Eagle" (Wamblee-Tokaha), while Rosebud placed a handmade Lakota warbonnet on the President's head. (Note: "It is the greatest honor to the Sioux Tribe of South Dakota to bestow upon you the emblem of the Sioux Nation in a war bonnet, and to welcome you to our tribe. We name you Leading Eagle, Wamblee-Tokaha. By this name you are to be known King and the greatest chief, which is signified by the bonnet and the name you bear. I congratulate you in the name of the Sioux Nation, and express the hope that you will continue to guide the will of this nation to its great destiny".) At the time, Rosebud was a student at the University of South Dakota. Rosebud's image was widely reported by the press and she became an instant national celebrity. "Rosebud's grace and beauty were not lost on the press reporters, who commented on the 'beautiful Indian maiden'." Thereafter, she was sought after by film and theatrical agents. In 1928, Cecil B. DeMille, tried to persuade her to take the title role in his movie, Ramona, but she declined. Rosebud's friends said she was a dead ringer for silent screen star Dolores Del Rio, who eventually got the role of the heroine in the "Indian love lyric." (Note: "One of the telling passages is where Ramona discovers she is half Indian. Her joy is cleverly expressed, as she goes from one to another crying out that she is an Indian.") The event and publicity also fueled Chauncey's interest in politics.

== Life in New York City ==
After the national publicity of President Coolidge's adoption, Yellow Robe was drawn to New York City at the age of 20 to pursue a theatrical career. Rosebud developed a dance act and performed in American Indian costume on stages in theaters and hotels. She was very popular, and many recognized her from the newsreel and newspaper coverage. Influenced by her father Chauncey Yellow Robe, Rosebud deplored inaccurate portrayals and images offered by radio shows and silent films. Yellow Robe believed most Anglos were totally ignorant of what Indians were capable of achieving, and used storytelling, performance and books to introduce generations of children to Native American folklore and culture. (Note: "Among the many unintended consequences of nineteenth-century assimilationist Indian policy was its tendency to split native communities into … opposed factions…. [There] were individuals whom federal officials labeled "blanket Indians' because of their staunch resistance to all government efforts at "civilization and Christianization.'… [and] so-called "progressivist' Indians who repudiated their native cultures and values for those of Euroamerican society".) Rosebud lived in New York for sixty-five years.

== Arthur Seymour ==
In 1927, Yellow Robe caught the attention of newspaper reporter and journalist Arthur (de Cinq Mars) Seymour (A. E. Seymour) while covering the President Coolidge's visit to the Black Hills. Seymour was a sophisticated New Yorker who was 25 years older than Rosebud. He and Yellow Robe courted, they fell in love, married in 1929 and settled in New York City. Seymour and Rosebud had a daughter that same year whom they named Tahcawin de Cinq-Mars Moy (referred to as "Buddy" or" Taki") after Rosebud Yellow Robe's paternal grandmother, Tachcawin (Deer Woman). Seymour raised Rosebud's younger sister Evelyn with "Buddy", and acted as Rosebud's publicist, scheduling presentations on Lakota culture at the American Museum of Natural History and other public venues. Seymour died in 1949.

== Indian Village at Jones Beach, New York ==
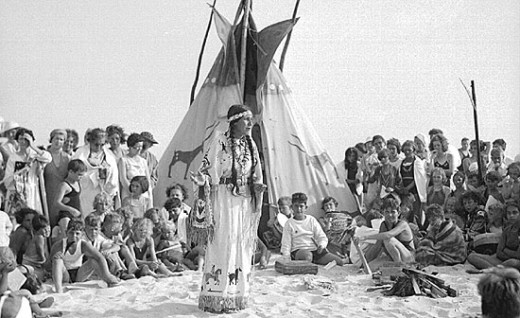
Rosebud at Jones Beach State Park, Long Island, New York.

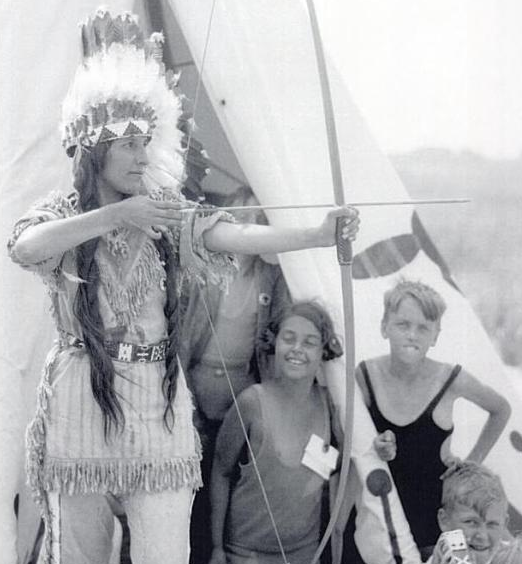
Rosebud Yellow Robe demonstrating how to use a bow and arrow at the Indian Village, Jones Beach State Park, Long Island, New York, 1933

In 1930, park planner Robert Moses hired Yellow Robe as Director of the Indian Village at Jones Beach State Park. Yellow Robe became a public celebrity to thousands of children who visited the Indian Village every summer from 1930 to 1950.

The Indian Village at Jones Beach was created as a Plains Indian village for children with three large tipis. The large Council Tipi contained museum cases with artifacts borrowed from the American Museum of Natural History. The other tipis served as club houses for the children.

Yellow Robe taught tens of thousands of school children and several generations of New Yorkers about Native American history and culture. (Note: Through [her] work, tens of thousands of children were provided with a new and realistic depiction of American Indians." Barnett and Klein's 2005 American National Biography supplement.) She primarily told stories and folklore of the Lakota and local Eastern Woodlands tribes. Rosebud recalled, "When I first lectured to public school classes in New York, many of the smaller children hid under their desks, for they knew from the movies what a blood-thirsty scalping Indian might do to them."

Yellow Robe dressed in a 19th-century Lakota Indian costume: A deerskin dress, leggings, and moccasins, with a feathered warbonnet, not customarily worn by women. Children listened to stories and legends Rosebud and her sisters heard from her father, teaching them about Native American culture through handicraft, games and songs. Each year ended with the Annual American Indian Art Exhibit where the projects the children had been working on were showcased and judged. Winners were awarded with authentic Native American artifacts which were then displayed in participating local schools.

During the winter season, dressed in tribal costume, Yellow Robe visited schools and public libraries to tell Lakota stories and legends. In the summer of 1932, Rosebud staged a ceremony characterized as a "Peace Council Fire" that attracted a crowd estimated at 1,000 people, including 300 children.

== Rosebud and Citizen Kane ==
Rosebud Yellow Robe's sled donated to the National Museum of the American Indian.

In the late 1930s, Yellow Robe and Orson Welles both worked at the CBS Broadcast Center in New York as broadcast celebrities on different radio programs. Welles may have borrowed Yellow Robe's name for the script of his classic film Citizen Kane (1941), in which the title character's dying word is "Rosebud." Film critic David Thomson stated that the origin of the name "Rosebud" is the greatest secret in cinema." The acclaimed film transformed a childhood sled into an icon of American culture, and there has been much speculation about the source of the name. In 1991, Edward Castle, a reporter for The Las Vegas Sun, contended that it was Rosebud Yellow Robe’s name that inspired Welles after discovering daily sign-in sheets for the CBS Radio Network, where both Welles and Rosebud worked on dramatic shows during the same time period. "At CBS, each radio actor signed the daily log on arriving and leaving the studio. Rosebud's signature appears in these logs on the same pages as Welles', and although they were not acquainted, they must have seen each other in the studio." In 1961, Rosebud Yellow Robe and her husband Alfred A. Franz donated a late 19th century Lakota sled fashioned from eight buffalo ribs to the National Museum of the American Indian in New York City. While the precise provenance of the sled is unknown, it believed to be the childhood sled of Rosebud's father, Chauncey. Welles, who died in 1985, never revealed the source for the name `'Rosebud.'` Yellow Robe answered to "the inevitable question, 'Were you named after the sled?' with 'Why no, the sled was named after me.'"

== Alfred A. Frantz ==
In 1951, Rosebud married photographer and publicist Alfred A. Frantz who also supported and encouraged her goals. Franz, born in 1908, was raised in Sioux Falls, South Dakota, and attended the University of South Dakota. As a young man in the 1930s, he journeyed to New York City to pursue his career. In 1938, when Frantz needed people to greet the Norwegian liner MS Oslofjord and he employed fellow South Dakotan Rosebud Yellow Robe to greet young Americans the piers. Though the two had attended the University of South Dakota at the same time, they had never met. Frantz continued to write until his death in 1993.

== Broken Arrow ==
In the 1950s, Yellow Robe appeared as a regular on NBC children's programs and was featured on Robert Montgomery Presents. In 1950, Rosebud Yellow Robe was hired by Twentieth-Century Fox to undertake a national publicity tour for the movie Broken Arrow. The movie, directed by Delmer Daves, starred James Stewart as Tom Jeffords, Jeff Chandler as Cochise and Jay Silverheels as Geronimo. The film is based on historical figures but fictionalizes their story in dramatized form. Broken Arrow was nominated for three Academy Awards, and won a Golden Globe award for Best Film Promoting International Understanding. Film historians reported that the movie was one of the first major Westerns since the Second World War to portray the Indians sympathetically.

Rosebud was interviewed by newspapers during the tour and explained that there were no such things as Indian princesses, and that the myth started when Pocahontas went to England and the English named her "Lady Rebecca." The Americans decided that she must be royalty, so they made her "princess." It's an old English rather an old Indian custom." Rosebud voiced complaints about the portrayals of Indians on radio, screen and television to "a new generation of children learning the old stereotypes about whooping, warring Indians, as if there weren't anything else interesting about us."

== Author of children's books ==
Rosebud Yellow Robe authored two children's books. An Album of the American Indian, published in 1969, highlights centuries of Native American history depicting the daily lives of seven different Indian tribes prior to European contact. A second book, Tonweya and the Eagles, and other Lakota Indian Tales, published in 1979, contains authentic Native American folk tales for children based on the stories from her own childhood and taught by her father. The stories feature a young boy named Chano, (short for Canowicakte or "Kill in the Woods"), her father, Chauncey. Rosebud's work was on the Texas Bluebonnet Award Master List for 1981, and won awards at the American Indian Art Exhibit in Scottsdale, Arizona.

== Honors and later years ==
In her later years, Rosebud continued her storytelling and lectures at the American Museum of Natural History and the Donnell Library of New York. In 1984, the W.H. Over Museum in Vermillion, South Dakota, commissioned a life-sized portrait of Yellow Robe done in oils. In May 1989, Yellow Robe was the focus of a three-day celebration and observation of "Rosebud Yellow Robe Day" at the University of South Dakota. Rosebud received tribute and an honorary doctorate in Humane Letters crossing bridges and cultures and provide a more accurate understanding of the Native American.

On 5 October 1992, Rosebud died of cancer at the age of 85.

In 1994, Yellow Robe's career as an educator was honored in a performance of "Rosebud's Song" by the National Dance Institute at New York City's Madison Square Garden. The event featured a dance performed to the music of folk singer Judy Collins and a chorus of 1,000 children from around the world. The performance was dedicated to Rosebud Yellow Robe for "devoting her life to children and to preserving and passing on Native American stories and culture." Also in 1994, the University of South Dakota created the "Rosebud Yellow Robe Society" and the "Rosebud Yellow Robe Scholarship."
