= Mommy Mommy =

- Written by: Sylvie Rosenthal; Catherine Bainbridge
- Directed by: Sylvie Rosenthal
- Theme music composer: Mona Laviolette; Linda Ludwick
- Country of origin: Canada
- Original language: English

Production
- Producers: Christina Fon; Linda Ludwick
- Cinematography: Edith Labbé
- Editor: Rosella Tursi
- Production company: Rezolution Pictures

Original release
- Release: 2007

Mommy Mommy is a 2007 documentary film directed by Sylvie Rosenthal about a Montreal lesbian couple's five-year-long struggle to have a child.

== Background ==
The film's subjects had been long-time friends and business associates with Rezolution Pictures co-founders Catherine Bainbridge and Ernest Webb, who thought that their personal story would help to illustrate the growing phenomenon of same-sex couple adoption in Quebec, the first Canadian province to legalize the practice.

The film represented a creative departure for Rezolution, which had previously focused on Canadian Aboriginal film and television productions.

== Story ==
The couple's efforts began in 2001, with one of them hoping to conceive from a sperm donor. After a year of trying unsuccessfully to become pregnant, they sought help from the fertility clinic at the Royal Victoria Hospital, only to find that treatment was refused to lesbians. After a complaint was filed with the Quebec Human Rights Commission by another couple, the hospital changed its policy. However, despite access to fertility drugs and continued efforts at artificial insemination, they were unable to conceive and their doctor suggested they adopt.

They put themselves on a local list for adoption, where the wait could be as long as 10 years, and also explored international adoption, only to be told that no country in the world accepted same sex couples as parents. Then they heard about a lesbian couple in Ontario who had successfully adopted two children from the United States. However, Quebec's provincial body that controls international adoption had only approved one U.S. adoption agency: a Tennessee-based Christian agency that refused to place babies with anything other than married heterosexual couples.

In spring 2006, Bainbridge and Webb noticed an advertisement in the Cree newsweekly The Nation, which they also co-own, from Batshaw Youth and Family Centres, an agency for abused and neglected children. The agency was looking for someone to adopt a Canadian Aboriginal child. The couple learn that there is a 7-month-old boy who also has a sister on the way, both in need of a home. At the end of the film, after a long and Byzantine process, the couple have two children of their own.

== Release ==
Mommy Mommy was screened at Reel Pride in Winnipeg and Image + Nation in Montreal, and had its television premiere on CBC Newsworld on December 4, 2007. It was then screened at the Women in Film Festival in Vancouver in March 2008 and rebroadcast on CBC for Mother's Day.

== See also ==
- Preacher's Sons - a documentary about a gay adoptive couple
- The Kid: What Happened After My Boyfriend and I Decided to Go Get Pregnant
- List of LGBT films directed by women
