= The Inhuman =

2021 Canadian thriller film

- French: L'Inhumain
- Directed by: Jason Brennan
- Written by: Jason Brennan
- Produced by: Jason Brennan
- Starring: Samian
- Cinematography: François Dutil
- Edited by: Amélie Labrèche
- Production company: Nish Media
- Distributed by: Septième Écran
- Release date: October 31, 2021 (FCIAT)
- Running time: 85 minutes
- Country: Canada
- Languages: French, English

The Inhuman (French: L'Inhumain) is a Canadian psychological thriller film, directed by Jason Brennan and released in 2021. Based on the Algonquin legend of the wendigo, the film stars Samian as Mathieu, a successful but troubled neurosurgeon whose life is falling apart, who confronts a wendigo when he returns to his childhood home of Kitigan Zibi for the first time in decades following his father's death.

The cast also includes Véronique Beaudet, Jeanne Roux-Côté, Sonia Vigneault, Julie Barbeau, Creed Commando, Phil Macho Commando, Andrew Dewache, Karl Farah, Lili Gagnon, Louis Gallant, Caroline Gelinas, Chloé Germentier, Richard Jutras, Neil Kroetsch, Pierre-Michel Le Breton, Brittany LeBorgne and Angela McIlroy-Wagar.

According to Brennan, the film was meant to explore the idea, present in some but not all versions of wendigo mythology, that the wendigo is not so much a supernatural being as a personification of a person's own inner demons.

The film premiered on October 31, 2021, at the Abitibi-Témiscamingue International Film Festival, before going into commercial release in April 2022.

== Awards ==
The film was screened at the 2022 American Indian Film Festival, where Samian won the award for Best Actor and Brennan won the award for Best Director.
