= Chauncey Yellow Robe =

Native American educator (1867–1930)

Chief Chauncey Yellow Robe
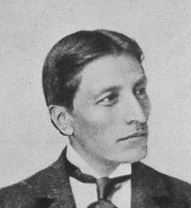
- Yellow Robe c. 1900
- Born: Canowicakte Yellow Robe; January 15, 1867; Sičháŋǧu Oyáte territory (known today as the Rosebud Indian Reservation), South Dakota, U.S.
- Died: April 8, 1930 (aged 63)
- Other names: Timber; Chief Yellow Robe
- Spouse: Lillian Belle Sprenger (m. 1905)
- Children: 3, including Rosebud
- Parents: Tasinagi (father); Tahcawin (mother)

Chief Chauncey Yellow Robe (born Canowicakte lit. 'kill in woods' Yellow Robe, 1867–1930) was a Sičhą́ǧú (Rosebud Sioux) educator, lecturer, actor, and Native American activist. His given name, Canowicakte, means "kill in woods," and he was nicknamed "Timber" in his youth.

He was taken to Carlisle Indian School, a Native American boarding school, from which he graduated in 1895. He was an educator for 32 years under the Bureau of Indian Affairs. In 1915, he became a devoted member of the Masonic Lodge of Rapid City, South Dakota, where he spent the majority of his life as a teacher and counselor.

He appeared in films, media, and political events in his later life, including adopting President Calvin Coolidge into the Sioux tribe and starring as Chief Chetoga in the 1930 historical drama The Silent Enemy.

He is the father of folklorist, educator, and writer Rosebud Yellow Robe.

== Early life and education ==
Yellow Robe was born in Sičháŋǧu Oyáte territory—known today as the Rosebud Indian Reservation—in southern South Dakota possibly on January 15, 1867. (Note: The New York Times article gives his age as 63, coinciding with 1867. The Masonic article was written nearly 100 years after his birth so it may not be accurate. Sources from the Carlisle School do not indicate his birth.)

He was the firstborn child of Tahcawin (lit. 'female deer'), who was a skilled artist and niece of Sitting Bull. His father, Tasinagi, was a hunter, Chief, and son of a hereditary chief, known later as Yellow Robe for war deeds. He described his childhood to have primarily involved hunting, fishing, and chasing buffaloes across the plains of South and North Dakota, Nebraska, Wyoming, and Montana.

His father sent him and his younger brother to the Carlisle Indian Industrial School in Carlisle, Pennsylvania, after being reassured by Chief Standing Bear and his son who went there. He entered the school in 1883, "having no knowledge of the English language" and no formal schooling, and became known as Chauncey. He described his entry into the school:

At the age of fifteen I was taken away to the far east to school by Brig. Gen. R. H. Pratt wearing my full Indian costume, long hair, painted face, feathers, moccasins, and blanket and not knowing a word of English. Yet, in a few years, I was able to pass from the silent walls of the school house as an independent American citizen. To educate the Indian is not a disgrace to the American civilization.

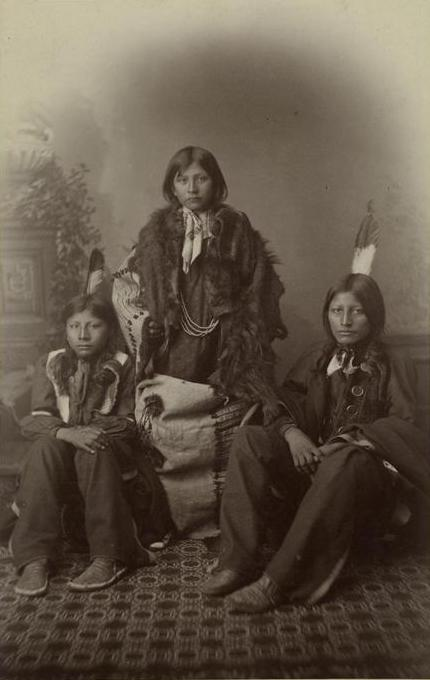
Studio portrait of Wounded "Richard" Yellow Robe, Henry Standing Bear, and Chauncey Yellow Robe the day after they entered the school on November 15, 1883

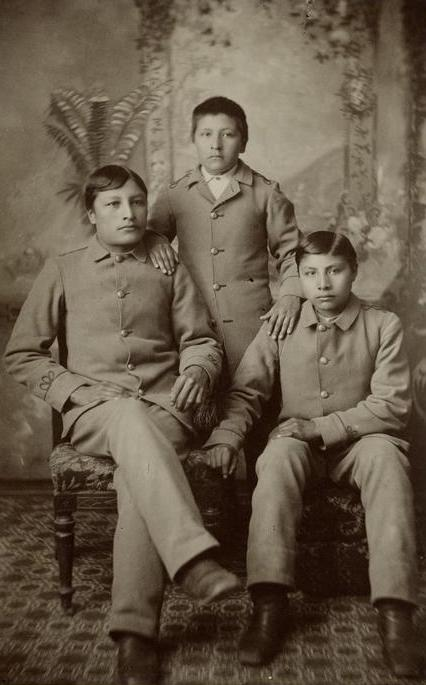
The same trio after their forced cultural assimilation, taken either six months later in 1884 or three years later in 1886. Chauncey Yellow Robe is seated on the left side.

In 1893, Yellow Robe was in charge of the Carlisle School's exhibit at the Chicago World's Fair. The exhibition was titled "Into Civilization and Citizenship" and featured "images of students, mannequins representing students, and other artifacts." He was also selected to represent the North American Indians at the Congress of Nations of the World's Fair.

He graduated with honors at a 6th grade level on April 1, 1895, being trained in the tailoring trade.

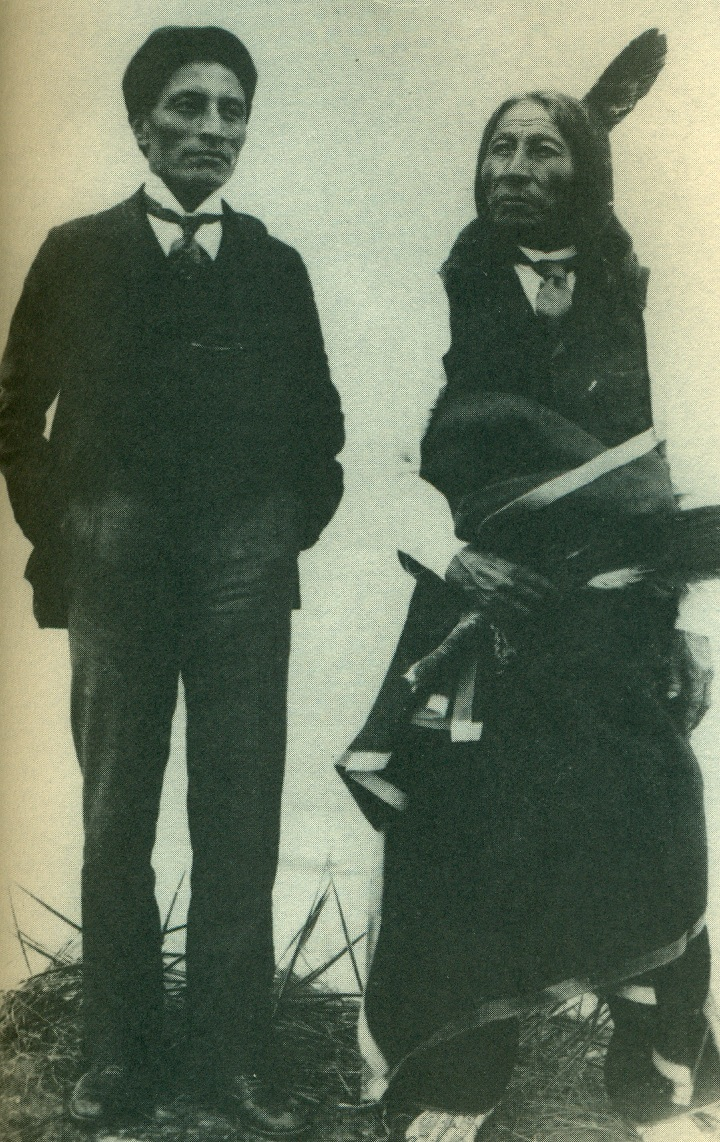
Chauncey Yellow Robe reunited with his father Chief Tasinagi Yellow Robe, 1895

== Career and activism ==
Soon after his graduation, Yellow Robe entered the government Indian School Service as an industrial teacher, presumably moving to Rapid City, South Dakota, to begin educating. After a year, he "occupied the position of disciplinarian" until resigning in 1902, and then re-entering in 1905.

From about 1896 to 1913, he was an industrial teacher and disciplinarian in Rapid City. He likely taught in the Rapid City Indian School, which was created in 1898 for Indian children from the Northern plains, including those from the Sioux, Northern Cheyenne, Shoshone, Arapaho, Crow, and Flathead tribes. It was one of the off-reservation Indian Boarding Schools established by the Bureau of Indian Affairs and was sometimes called "School of the Hills".

Around this time, he met Lillian Belle Sprenger, a volunteer nurse at the Rapid City Indian School. Sprenger's family was from the German-speaking city of Neftenbach, Switzerland; she was of Swiss-German ancestry and was born in Minnesota in 1885. Sprenger and Yellow Robe married in 1905. The couple had three daughters: Rosebud, Chauncina, and Evelyn Robe. A report of the family was published in February 1914 in the Western Christian Advocate.

His daughter Rosebud Yellow Robe became an award-winning folklorist, educator, and writer.

In October 1914, Yellow Robe was a speaker at the Fourth Annual Conference of the Society of American Indians in Rapid City, South Dakota. There, he delivered his lecture, "The Menace of the Wild West Show", which was transcribed and published in the American Indian Magazine. Yellow Robe's lecture condemns multiple contemporaneous cultural depictions of Native Americans:

All these Wild West Shows are exhibiting the Indian worse than he ever was, and deprive him of his high manhood and individuality ... We see a monument of the Indian in New York harbor as a memorial of his vanishing race. The Indian wants no such memorial monument, for he is not yet dead. The name of the North American Indian will not be forgotten as long as the rivers flow and the hills and mountains shall stand, and though we have progressed, we have not vanished.

From 1915, Yellow Robe was a member of the Masonic Lodge in Rapid City.

In 1916, Yellow Robe published an account of his childhood in Volume 4 of the American Indian Magazine.

=== Tribal adoption of Calvin Coolidge ===
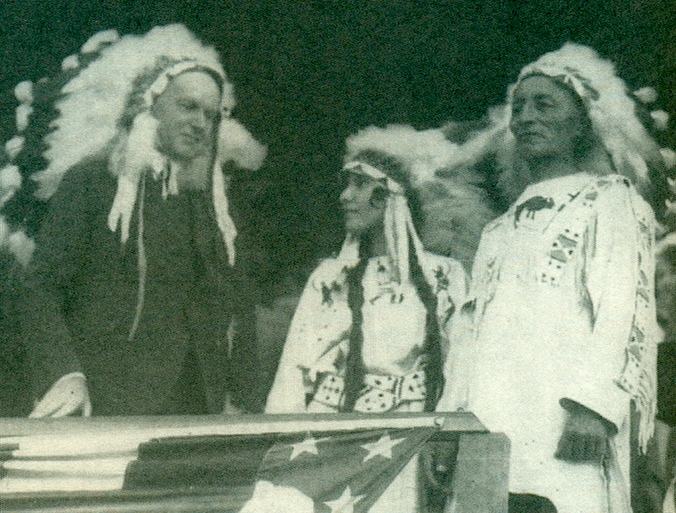
August 4, 1927: Yellow Robe inducting Calvin Coolidge (left) into the Lakota tribe in Deadwood, South Dakota, with daughter Rosebud Yellow Robe (center)

In 1927, President Calvin Coolidge and First Lady Grace Coolidge vacationed in South Dakota for several months, where they met with various Native tribes across the state. On August 4, 1927, the couple arrived in Deadwood, South Dakota, to attend the town's annual Days of 76 rodeo celebration. The Lakota tribe used the occasion to arrange a ceremony to induct Coolidge as a member of their nation, "in recognition of the role he played in passing the Indian Citizenship Act of 1924." Several hundred Lakotas attended the event, led by Chauncey Yellow Robe, his childhood friend Henry Standing Bear, and his daughter Rosebud Yellow Robe.

Chauncey Yellow Robe bestowed the Lakota name Wanblee-Tokaha (lit. 'Leading Eagle') upon President Coolidge, and "adopted" him into the Lakota Sioux tribe as a "High Chieftain". After presenting Coolidge his native name, Yellow Robe stated the following:

Today, Mr. President, you are a one-hundred percent American by adoption into an aboriginal tribe. Good White Father, we welcome you into our tribe. We hope you will continue to guide this great nation on to a still greater destiny.

After this, Rosebud Yellow Robe presented Coolidge with a feather war bonnet and yellow skins, and Grace Coolidge with moccasins. Photographs of the induction gained front-page coverage on The New York Times, Los Angeles Times, and The Baltimore Sun and were made into postcards. That year, Rosebud Yellow Robe left for New York in pursuit of a theatrical career.

=== Appearance in film ===
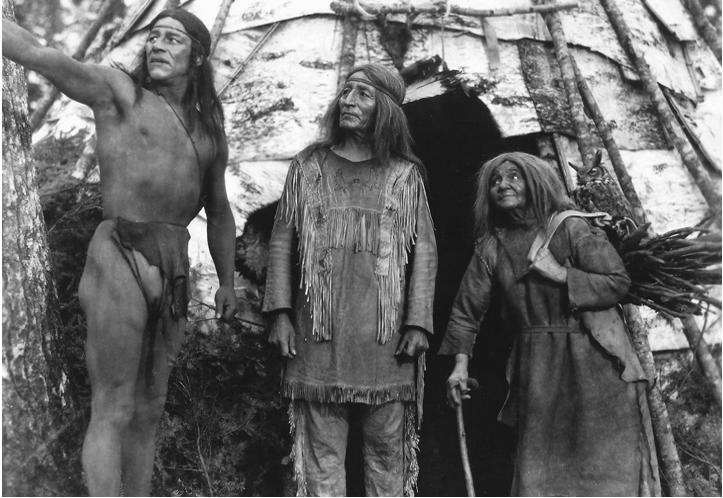
Yellow Robe (center) starring as Chief Chetoga in 1930 historical drama film The Silent Enemy

Circa 1928, Yellow Robe met Molly Spotted Elk while visiting the American Museum of Natural History. She introduced him to the film directors Douglas Burden and William Chanler. The directors immediately offered Yellow Robe a part as an Indian chief. However, he initially declined due to the generally negative portrayals of Native Americans in cinema and returned to Rapid City. His daughter Rosebud Yellow Robe persuaded her father to perform the part after being assured by Burden that the film would contain "an honest depiction of Native American life." Upon this assurance, Yellow Robe changed his mind and traveled to Arnprior and Lake Temagami in Ontario, Canada, to shoot the film.

In 1928, Yellow Robe portrayed Chief Chetoga in Burden and Chanler's historical drama film The Silent Enemy, which was released in 1930. Partially funded by the American Museum of Natural History, the film depicted a complex drama of an Ojibwe tribal life before the arrival of Europeans. Yellow Robe played one of the leading roles and helped with technical direction; according to Atalie Unkalunt, the cast consisted solely of Native Americans, though this was later complicated by the appearance of Chief Buffalo Child Long Lance, whose ancestry was questioned. Notably, Yellow Robe delivered the film's sound-on-film speech introduction, wherein he greets the audience, praises the story, and expresses hope for the Ojibwe tribe's future.

Yellow Robe's portrait was published in 1928 in the National Geographic, captioned "His Forebears Ruled the Dakotas".

== Death and legacy ==
On April 8, 1930, Yellow Robe died of pneumonia at the Rockefeller Institute Hospital. The New York Times described his death as "ending a picturesque and notable career".

His family shipped his body to Rapid City, and his funeral was held in the city's Masonic Temple. He was buried beside Lillian Belle Sprenger in Mountain View Cemetery.

After Yellow Robe's death, President Calvin Coolidge stated, "[He] was a born leader who realized that the destiny of the Indian is indissolubly bound up with the destiny of our country. His loyalty to his tribe and people made him a most patriotic American."
