= Rumble: The Indians Who Rocked the World =

2017 Canadian documentary film

- Film poster
- Directed by: Catherine Bainbridge; Alfonso Maiorana
- Produced by: Stevie Salas; Tim Johnson; Catherine Bainbridge; Christina Fon; Linda Ludwick; Lisa M. Roth; Tim Johnson
- Cinematography: Alfonso Maiorana
- Edited by: Jeremiah Hayes; Benjamin Duffield
- Music by: Benoît Charest
- Production company: Rezolution Pictures
- Release date: 2017
- Country: Canada
- Language: English

Rumble: The Indians Who Rocked the World is a 2017 Canadian documentary film directed by Catherine Bainbridge and co-directed by Alfonso Maiorana. The film profiles the impact of Indigenous musicians from Canada, Mexico and the US on the development of rock music.

Musicians profiled include Jesse Ed Davis (Kiowa, Comanche, Seminole, Muscogee), Mildred Bailey (Coeur d'Alene), Charley Patton, Link Wray, Stevie Salas, Buffy Sainte-Marie, Robbie Robertson, Randy Castillo, Jimi Hendrix, Taboo and others. The title of the film is a reference to the pioneering instrumental "Rumble", released in 1958 by the American group Link Wray & His Ray Men. The instrumental piece was very influential on many artists.

The idea for the film came from Stevie Salas (Apache heritage) and Tim Johnson (Grand River Mohawk), two of the film's executive producers. They created an exhibition for the Smithsonian National Museum of the American Indian about the Indigenous influence on American music, titled "Up Where We Belong: Native Musicians in Popular Culture", borrowing a title from the Oscar-winning song, "Up Where We Belong" co-written by Buffy Sainte-Marie, an Italian-American who claimed to be Cree.

The film features many influential musicians who discuss the musical contributions of artists who have identified as Indigenous, including commentaries from Quincy Jones, George Clinton, Taj Mahal, Martin Scorsese, John Trudell (Santee Dakota), Steven Tyler, Marky Ramone, Slash, Iggy Pop, Buddy Guy, Steven Van Zandt, Taylor Hawkins, Robert Trujillo, and others.

The film premiered at the 2017 Sundance Film Festival.

The film was released on home entertainment (DVD) on December 19, 2018 via Kino Lorber. It had its broadcast premiere on PBS as part of Independent Lens on January 21, 2019.

== Awards ==
At Sundance, the film won the World Cinema Documentary Special Jury Award for Masterful Storytelling. The film won Best Music Documentary at the 2017 Boulder International Film Festival.

At the Hot Docs Canadian International Documentary Festival, the film won both of the Audience Award categories.

In December, the Toronto International Film Festival named the film to its annual Canada's Top Ten list of the ten best Canadian films.

The film won three Canadian Screen Awards at the 6th Canadian Screen Awards in 2018, for Best Feature Length Documentary, Best Editing in a Documentary (Jeremiah Hayes and Benjamin Duffield) and Best Cinematography in a Documentary (Maiorana).
