= Rezolution Pictures =

Canadian production company

- Type: Private
- Industry: Film; Television Production
- Founded: Montreal, Quebec (2001; 25 years ago)
- Founders: Catherine Bainbridge; Ernest Webb
- Headquarters: Montreal, Canada
- Key people: Catherine Bainbridge; Ernest Webb; Christina Fon; Linda Ludwick; Neil Diamond
- Website: rezolutionpictures.com

Rezolution Pictures is an Indigenous film and television production company based in Montreal, Quebec, Canada. The company was founded in 2001 by the husband and wife team of Ernest Webb and Catherine Bainbridge. Rezolution Pictures’ passionate team is led by co-founders/Presidents/directors/executive producers Ernest Webb and Catherine Bainbridge, Vice-President/executive producer Christina Fon, and CFO/executive producer Linda Ludwick.

Rezolution’s Emmy-nominated feature documentary, Rumble: The Indians Who Rocked the World, has won several awards, including Sundance Film Festival’s World Cinema Documentary Special Jury Award for Masterful Storytelling and three Canadian Screen Awards for Best Feature Length Documentary, Best Cinematography and Best Editing. Another of Rezolution’s award-winning feature documentaries is the 2010 Peabody winner Reel Injun. The company’s documentary series Gespe'gewa'gi: The Last Land premiered on APTN in February 2021. Its comedy series Moose TV, for the Showcase network in Canada, received the Indie Award for Best Comedy Series from the Canadian Film and Television Producers Association in 2008.

Rezolution's authentic, intentional, and impactful storytelling spans several genres, including comedies, dramas, TV series and big-budget non-fiction documentary features, creating more than 100 hours of content. They have established original Indigenous content within mainstream media and sold programming around the world in major markets to broadcasters including APTN, CBC GEM, Superchannel, OMNI, TVO, CBC, RDI, ARTV, Télé-Québec, FNX, Knowledge, and Bell Media, and internationally with Vision Maker, PBS, Peacock +, and ARTE.

Rezolution has produced multiple works by directors of Quebec Aboriginal heritage, including Tracey Deer and Neil Diamond. Webb and Bainbridge are also co-founders of The Nation, a news magazine serving the Cree people of Eeyou Istchee.

== Productions ==
=== Factual ===
- Cree Spoken Here (2001)
- One More River: The Deal that Split the Cree (2004)
- Heavy Metal: A Mining Disaster in Northern Quebec (2004)
- Mohawk Girls (2004)
- Rez Rides (2004)
- Dabb Iyiyuu (2004–2006)
- Moose TV (2006)
- Mommy Mommy (2008)
- Club Native (2008)
- The Last Explorer (2008)
- Reel Injun (2009)
- Down the Mighty River (2009)
- Working It Out Together (2010-2015)
- Smoke Traders (2011)
- Indians & Aliens (2013–2017)
- The Wolverine: The Fight of the James Bay Cree (2014)
- The Oka Legacy (2015)
- Rumble: The Indians Who Rocked the World (2017)
- Dream Catchers Bio (2018)
- Searching for Cleopatra (2020)
- Aging Well (2020)
- Truth and Lies (2023)
- Red Fever (2024)
- So Surreal: Behind the Masks (2024)
- James Bay 1975: The Shock of Two Nations (2025)

=== Scripted ===
- Mohawk Girls (2014–2017)
- Little Bird (2023)
