= Red Fever =

- Film poster
- Directed by: Neil Diamond; Catherine Bainbridge
- Written by: Neil Diamond; Catherine Bainbridge
- Produced by: Lisa M. Roth
- Edited by: Rebecca Lessard
- Music by: Pura Fe; Jesse Zubot
- Production company: Rezolution Pictures
- Distributed by: Les Films du 3 mars
- Release date: May 1, 2024 (Hot Docs)
- Running time: 86 minutes
- Country: Canada
- Language: English

Red Fever is a 2024 Canadian documentary film, directed by Neil Diamond and Catherine Bainbridge. The film explores mainstream Western culture's fascination with, and tendency to appropriate, indigenous culture without fully understanding it.

The film premiered at the 2024 Hot Docs Canadian International Documentary Festival. It was subsequently also screened at the DOXA Documentary Film Festival, where it was the winner of the Nigel Moore Award for Youth Programming. It entered commercial release in June 2024.

It won the Cinema Indigenized Outstanding Talent award at the 2024 Cinéfest Sudbury International Film Festival.

== Critical response ==
In Screen International, Tim Grierson called the film "a commendable educational tool that could be shown in classrooms", and "a breezy but earnest exploration of the myriad ways Indigenous societies have shaped the modern world, from contemporary fashion to democracy itself."

In POV Magazine, Pat Mullen wrote: "Audiences expecting cutaways to notorious pretendians in entertainment and academia won’t find them. Instead of focusing on individual white people exploiting Indigenous culture for personal gain, Diamond and Bainbridge take a “bigger picture” approach. This film queries the culture that treats one part of the population as a collective mascot."
