= The Silent Enemy (1930 film) =

1930 film

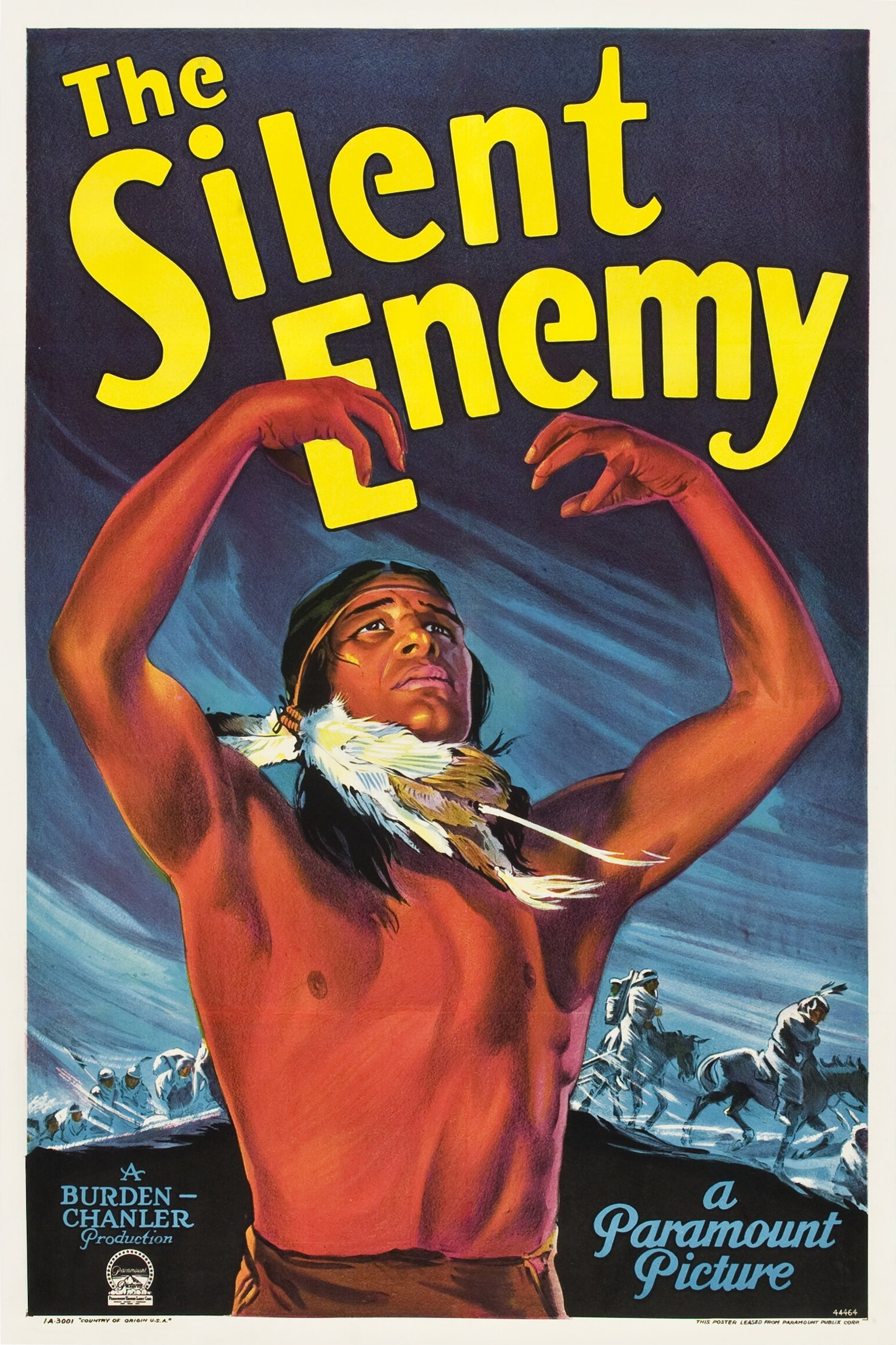
- Theatrical release poster
- Directed by: H.P. Carver
- Screenplay by: W. Douglas Burden; Richard Carver; Julian Johnson
- Produced by: W. Douglas Burden; William C. Chanler
- Starring: Chauncey Yellow Robe; Chief Buffalo Child Long Lance; Chief Akawanush; Mary Alice Nelson Archambaud
- Cinematography: Marcel Le Picard
- Edited by: Shirley C. Burden
- Music by: Karl Hajos; W. Franke Harling; Howard Jackson; John Leipold; Gene Lucas; Charles Midgely; Oscar Potoker; Max Terr
- Production company: Burden-Chanler Productions
- Distributed by: Paramount Pictures
- Release date: May 9, 1930
- Running time: 84 minutes
- Country: United States
- Languages: Sound (Part-Talkie); English Intertitles

The Silent Enemy is a 1930 American sound part-talkie drama film directed by H.P. Carver and written by W. Douglas Burden, Richard Carver and Julian Johnson. In addition to sequences with audible dialogue or talking sequences, the film features a synchronized musical score and sound effects along with English intertitles. The drama stars Chauncey Yellow Robe (billed as "Chief Yellow Robe"), Chief Buffalo Child Long Lance, Chief Akawanush and Mary Alice Nelson Archambaud. It premiered on May 19, 1930, at the Criterion Theater in New York City and was later distributed by Paramount Pictures in August of the same year.

The story dramatizes a famine experienced by the post-classical Ojibwe tribe and its leaders (the tribe is anglicized as "Ojibway" in the film). It also depicts a power struggle between skilled hunter Baluk and corrupt medicine man Dagwan.

Before the film begins, Chauncey Yellow Robe greets the audience with a sound speech, in which he explains the tribe's connection to the story and expresses hope for the Ojibwe tribe's history and future.

According to the 26 Dec 1930 Motion Picture Daily, it was filmed in the “timber limits” outside Arnprior, Ontario, while another source cites Lake Temagami as the location. 200 indigenous people were employed in the film's production.

== Plot ==
The Silent Enemy (1930)

The Chief of the tribe, Chetoga trusts his best hunter Baluk to ensure the tribe does not suffer from starvation in the coming winter. They agree, and Baluk inquires about the Chief's daughter, who is trapping partridges; he insists her path is rocky and goes to make sure she is safe. The Chief obliges him to do so.

The Chief is then approached by Dagwan, the tribe's corrupt medicine man. He ridicules Baluk behind his back and requests "another squaw" for himself, implying that he wishes to bed Chetoga's daughter, Neewa. The Chief declines his offer and suggests he look towards a group of jolly spinsters nearby.

Meanwhile, the Chief's daughter Neewa is cornered by a bear and nearly forced off the edge of a cliff and into a river. As soon as he arrives, Baluk slays the bear and captures the bear cubs, adding to Neewa's affection towards him. He returns to the village and gifts the cubs as pets for the Chief's other child, his young son Cheeka.

Soon, the adults of the tribe go merrily on a hunt; Cheeka, the son of the Chief, is eager to help but is told by Baluk that he is too young to join. Cheeka still makes a daring attempt to join them, paddling a canoe, with a basket containing his bear cubs behind him, but upon reaching the hunters, he is told to return home. As the days pass, the hunt is fruitless. At last, the hunters and Baluk returns to the Chief with nothing.

Dagwan rejoices in Baluk's failure, saying a "good hunter" would have found food here. Hoping to gain more influence over Baluk, he secretly slays an elk using dark magic. He brings prove his superiority. The tribe rejoices in the meat. During the feast, Neewa privately comforts Baluk by dismissing Dagwan as a threat, insinuating that one lucky kill does not make him a great hunter. Jealous, Dagwan becomes yet more cruel in his plan to take power from Baluk.

During Council, the Chief recalls that, in the past, 6 years of abundance inevitably lead to a 7th year of famine. Nevertheless, Baluk inspires the tribe to march north for the crossing of the caribou, where they can hunt and feed on thousands of the fauna. The Chief approves it, while Dagwan ridicules and demeans Baluk's idea.

The tribes marches north and finds more barren lands and bitter cold. This pattern repeats again and again, each time with a worse result. During the marches, multiple members of the tribe die from the cold and starvation.

As the tribe is desperate for food, the Chief announces that he must meditate on a solution. Baluk and Dagwan help him to a solitary mountain, where he sits for days watching the sun rise and sun set as he meditates on a solution. He asks them not to find him until his prayers have manifested food for the tribe. He appears to be dressed little else besides a fur blanket despite the snow and cold.

The Chief returns and is nursed back to health by Dagwan and Neewa. Weakly, the Chief describes a vision of marching animals and a wolf growling at the sky, which Dagwan insists means that Baluk has led the tribe to doom and turning back is necessary. Despite Dagwan's explanation, the Chief continues to obey Baluk.

Secretly searching for ways to turn the tribe against Baluk, Dagwan goes south and encounters another tribe's cache during a snowstorm. He pauses, aware that stealing food from other tribes is prohibited, but decides that it would be justified if the cache was presented as a supernatural event. Knowing his tracks would be erased from the snowstorm, he steals some meat for himself and later leads the tribe to it, pretending a large cache of meat is a prophecy he saw in a vision that would reward them for going south and disobeying Baluk. However, a wolverine fouls the carcasses in the cache (presumably with urine), ruining Dagwan's plan. Dagwan quickly explains this was their punishment for going north.

As the marches north continue, the Chief realizes he is weak and soon to die. A heartfelt scene shows his passing, as he rises to his feet and demands the items he wishes to have in the afterlife, including his war bonnet and hunting bow, and a vision that shows him crossing over to the other side. His last words include a command to move north and for Baluk to be the next Chief of the tribe.

After the Chief's passing, Baluk instructs Neewa and the tribe to keep mourning to a minimum in order to keep marching north, so as to honor the late Chief's last wishes. He inspires the hunters to set up smoke signals, to ignite once the caribou are hopefully spotted.

Even as Chief, Baluk struggles to remain in power due to Dagwan's manipulation of the tribe. At last, Dagwan convinces the Ojibwes to use Baluk as the scapegoat for their hunger and suffering since their journey north. He libelously blames Baluk for every father, mother, and child's death, and soon performs supernatural bending of the elements such as smoke-bending to awe the tribe. He announces that the Great Spirit has commanded for a person to be sacrificed, and he declares it should be the Chief, Baluk. The tribe grimly sides with him and they begin to chant and search for Baluk.

Baluk laments his fate with Neewa when they hear the tribe chanting for his death. Baluk accepts that this is his end, and he steps out to meet Dagwan. With mirth, Dagwan asks him how he wishes to be executed. Baluk tells Dagwan he wishes to die by fire, as an Ojibwe chief should. Drummers perform and the entire tribe gathers to watch as Baluk sits atop a large stack of wood, playing an instrument and crying as he prepares for his painful death. The fire encircles him, burning him, and he throws a tarp over himself possibly to abate the pain. Dagwan sneaks glances at Neewa and Cheeka, who are sobbing with horror. Suddenly, a smoke signal ignites - the caribou are crossing just as Baluk foretold. Immediately, the tribe runs over the wood to rescue Baluk from the fire, and though his chest and face appear to be painfully burned, he fights to stand upright and help capture the caribou with the rest of the tribe.

The hunters gather to spear the caribou, which turns out to be much more difficult than expected, as there are thousands of them in hordes causing them to be difficult to distract or kill. Cheeka fires a distant bow and arrow and kills a caribou, presumably his first kill. He runs to the carcass to fetch his arrow and check whether the animal is dead, but he is soon trapped by a stampede that nearly kills him. Baluk runs in to rescue Cheeka and bring him back to the tribe. For 6 days, the caribou migrate by the thousands.

Dagwan knows that he has wronged the tribe and awaits his sentence. At last, Baluk arrives to discuss his punishment, particularly for doing evil in the name of the Great Spirit. He reminds him the penalty for this is not an honorable death like fire, but "the slow death," and Dagwan reproachfully accepts. As per tradition, Dagwan is exiled to the barren lands with no food and no weapons. A final shot shows him wandering through an empty, snowy plain, looking around but seeing nothing before him.

A splendid, warm feast after the famine occurs. The new village has been constructed from the skin of the caribous, and roasted meat hangs in the forefront of the circles. Toddlers and older adults eat, laugh, and sing songs. In a nearby tent, Neewa watches lovingly as Baluk and Cheeka reminisce about Baluk's adventures and play-fight as they roleplay previous hunts. The film ends on a recurring vision; a wolf growing in a cloudy sky.

== Cast ==
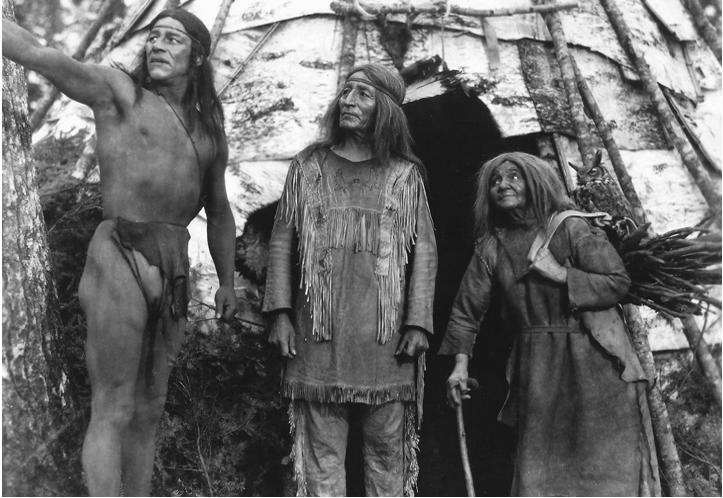
Photograph from the film, featuring Baluk (Long Lace, left) and Chetoga (Yellow Robe, center)

- Chauncey Yellow Robe as Chetoga (billed as "Chief Yellow Robe")
- Chief Buffalo Child Long Lance as Baluk
- Chief Akawanush as Dagwan
- Mary Alice Nelson Archambaud as Neewa
- Cheeka as Cheeka

Angelic Leclair is the one with the owl depicted on her shoulder. She was a real medicine woman in life.

== Production ==
Shot circa 1928 in the Temagami region of Ontario, the film depicted the life of the Ojibwe prior to the arrival of European settlers and was unique for its early use of Indigenous actors. Burden relied on to the detailed accounts of French missionaries documented in The Jesuit Relations during the writing of the screenplay.

Animals appear centrally in the film as companions, sources of danger and conflict, and recurring symbols. Animals in the film include partridges in traps; an adult bear, shot with an arrow by Baluk; a beaver joyfully spotted by Cheeka; its two bear cubs, kept as pets by Cheeka, who are in a bucket on a canoe, climb trees, and later play with the tribe's wolves; a wolverine breaking into another tribe's caché to eat its preserved meat; starving Husky dogs attacking each other; multiple elks, killed; a 9-foot mountain lion attacking a bear; and the crossing of the caribou as well as caribou that had been shot with arrows. The animal's corpses are shown; they appear to be real animals hunted and slain, usually with arrows.

=== Special effects and animals ===
Multiple scenes including special effects occur, including spiritual visions, metaphors, prophecies, and visual interpretations of the afterlife. Most of these moments involve double exposure, overlaying two existing footages, such as the recurring symbol of a wolf growling over a stormy sky.

The movie uses film tinting artistically to connote heat (red often shown during fires, blue during snowstorms), time of day (blue for evening, orange for mornings), emotional cues (brown for joy, blue for antagonists), and possibly as chapter divisions to denote time passing and seasonal change.

Chauncey Yellow Robe's speech at the start contained sound-on-film, and there were multiple moments of synchronized chants throughout the film. The Motion Picture Daily still described the film as "silent with a synchronized score."

== Release ==
The Silent Enemy premiered on May 19, 1930, in New York City at the Criterion Theater, and its premiere was briefly mentioned in the Motion Picture Daily. Having taken more than two years to film and edit, its release coincided with the rise of sound films, which impacted the success of the film despite strong critical praise.

In 2012, composer Siegfried Friedrich wrote a new modern score for the film, performed by violinist Serkan Gürkan and sound edited by composer Roumen Dimitrov and this has replaced the original synchronized sound of the original release. The film is in need of restoration of the original synchronized score and sound effect track.
