= Beans (2020 film) =

2020 film by Tracey Deer

- Film poster
- Directed by: Tracey Deer
- Written by: Tracey Deer; Meredith Vuchnich
- Produced by: Anne-Marie Gélinas
- Starring: Kiawentiio; Rainbow Dickerson; Violah Beauvais; Paulina Alexis
- Cinematography: Marie Davignon
- Edited by: Sophie Farkas Bolla
- Music by: Mario Sévigny
- Production company: EMA Films
- Distributed by: Mongrel Media
- Release date: September 13, 2020 (TIFF)
- Running time: 92 minutes
- Country: Canada
- Language: English

Beans is a 2020 Canadian drama film directed by Mohawk-Canadian filmmaker Tracey Deer. It explores the 1990 Oka Crisis at Kanesatake, which Deer lived through as a child, through the eyes of Tekehentahkhwa (nicknamed "Beans"), a young Mohawk girl whose perspective on life is radically changed by these events.

The film premiered at the 2020 Toronto International Film Festival, where it was second runner up for the People's Choice Award. It was also featured at the 2021 New York International Children's Film Festival, among others.

The film won the Canadian Screen Award for Best Picture at the 9th Canadian Screen Awards in 2021, along with the John Dunning Best First Feature Film Award. It was nominated for the Prix Iris for Best Screenplay at the 24th Quebec Cinema Awards in 2022.

== Plot ==
Tekehentahkhwa, who goes by the nickname "Beans", is a bright preteen who lives in Kahnawake, a Mohawk reserve along the St. Lawrence River. She is encouraged by her mother, Lily, to try to apply to a prestigious, predominantly white school in Montreal, something her father opposes.

After seeing their cousin Karahwen'hawi on TV protesting the expansion of a golf course into Kahnesatake territory, another Mohawk reserve upriver, the entire family drives to the area to support the protestors. The Mohawk land is surrounded by the town of Oka, Quebec, which was seeking to expand its golf course into a historic Mohawk cemetery. Beans and her little sister are quickly caught up in a police raid, which strengthens her parents' resolve to stay and help during the protest. Tensions grow fast. Barricades are built and the Kahnesatake territory is isolated. Food runs short and women and children are given the possibility to evacuate. Outside, protesters throw rocks at the evacuating cars.

In the meantime, Beans befriends April, an older girl she seeks to emulate in smoking, cursing, and friendships with boys. April teaches Beans to toughen up, often violently.

The army is brought in to replace local police, and tensions rise among protesters and the military. Beans, her younger sister Ruby, and her mother Lily are relocated to a nearby hotel with other Mohawk women and children from the community. Beans attends a party in the hotel with April and some older teens, where she drinks alcohol and has her first kiss with April's older brother. In the hotel lobby, Beans starts a fight with a white girl around her same age, causing Beans and her family to be removed from the hotel.

Beans, Ruby, Lily, April, and April's brother return home by sneaking through the barricade, just as Lily is about to give birth. As Lily is in labor, Beans attends a campfire with April and her friends. April's brother takes Beans aside and asks for oral sex, then becomes aggressive when Beans refuses and defends herself as taught by April.

When Beans goes to April for help, April implies that her father has been sexually abusing her. Beans returns home, where her mother has given birth safely.

Some time later, Beans helps April sneak out of her father's place so that her friend can move in with her grandmother. Beans and her family meet with their cousin Hawi, who declares that an agreement has been reached with the government to protect the native burial ground and prevent the city's golf course expansion. Beans starts at the prestigious private school in the fall, where she proudly introduces herself as Tekehentahkhwa, her full Mohawk name.

== Cast ==
- Kiawentiio as Beans/Tekehentahkhwa
- Rainbow Dickerson as Lily
- Violah Beauvais as Ruby
- Paulina Alexis as April
- Joel Montgrand as Kania'tariio
- Jay Cardinal Villeneuve as Gary
- D'Pharaoh Woon-A-Tai as Hank
- Taio Gélinas as Coyote

== Production ==
The semi-autobiographical story is based on historic events that Deer lived through as a child. While she includes harsh events, she has said she wanted to avoid having the film be traumatic for viewers. It is recommended for viewers of 14+ in age. Filming took place in Kahnawake and Montreal in 2019.

Deer began writing the script in 2012, in collaboration with Meredith Vuchnich. The film's budget is undisclosed, but it is estimated to have cost less than $2 million to create. It was a long, seven-year process, partly because revisiting the Oka Crisis brought up difficult memories. She sought therapy to help her deal with them. The screenplay was the winner of the TIFF-CBC Films Screenwriter Award in 2019.

== Release ==
Beans had its world premiere at the Toronto International Film Festival in September 2020.

== Reception ==
=== Critical response ===
On the review aggregator website Rotten Tomatoes, 91% of 54 critics' reviews are positive, with an average rating of 7.6/10. The website's consensus reads: "Beans opens a compelling window into the indigenous coming-of-age experience -- and serves as an affecting debut for Kiawentiio." Metacritic, which uses a weighted average, assigned the film a score of 74 out of 100, based on 13 critics, indicating "generally favorable" reviews.

The film was named to TIFF's year-end Canada's Top Ten list for feature films.

=== Accolades ===
Award	Date of ceremony	Category	Recipient(s)	Result	Ref(s)
Canadian Screen Awards	May 20, 2021	Best Motion Picture	Anne-Marie Gélinas	Won	
Canadian Screen Awards	May 20, 2021	Best Cinematography	Marie Davignon	Nominated	
Canadian Screen Awards	May 20, 2021	Best Sound Mixing	Stéphane Bergeron, Yann Cleary	Nominated	
Canadian Screen Awards	May 20, 2021	Best Casting in a Film	Maxime Giroux	Nominated	
Canadian Screen Awards	May 20, 2021	John Dunning Best First Feature Award	Tracey Deer	Won	
Directors Guild of Canada	October 2020	DGC Discovery Award	Tracey Deer	Won	
Kingston Canadian Film Festival	February 26–March 7, 2021	Limestone Financial People's Choice Award	Tracey Deer	Won	
Vancouver Film Critics Circle	March 8, 2021	Best Supporting Actress in a Canadian Film	Rainbow Dickerson	Won	
Vancouver Film Critics Circle	March 8, 2021	One to Watch	Kiawentiio	Won	
Vancouver International Film Festival	September 24–October 7, 2020	Best Canadian Film	Tracey Deer	Won	
Writers Guild of Canada	April 26, 2021	Best Feature Film	Tracey Deer, Meredith Vuchnich	Won	
Toronto Film Critics Association	March 2022	Best Canadian Film	Beans	Won	
Prix collégial du cinéma québécois	2022	Best Film	Beans	Nominated	
