= Mohawk Girls (film) =

Mohawk Girls is a 2005 documentary film by Tracey Deer about the experiences of adolescent girls growing up on the Mohawk reserve of Kahnawake, across the Saint Lawrence River from Montreal, Quebec. Deer, who was born and raised in Kahnawake, focuses on three young women: Felicia, Amy, and Lauren, a mixed race teen.

The film received the Best Documentary prize at the ImagineNATIVE Film + Media Arts Festival. It was produced by Rezolution Pictures and the National Film Board of Canada in association with broadcaster Aboriginal Peoples Television Network. The film also aired in Canada on CBC Newsworld's documentary series The Lens on February 20, 2007, and February 24, 2007.

== Series ==
In 2012, APTN and OMNI Television announced the production of a scripted comedy-drama series based on the film also called Mohawk Girls.
