= Dreamspeakers International Film Festival =

The Dreamspeakers International Film Festival is an annual film festival in Edmonton, Alberta, which programs a lineup of films related to First Nations, Métis, Inuit and other international indigenous peoples.

The oldest surviving indigenous film festival in Canada, it was first staged in 1992; however, its inaugural edition faced some controversy when the First Nations Filmmakers Alliance pressured the festival's organizing committee to pull several scheduled films which had not been made by indigenous filmmakers. The Filmmakers Alliance disputed six films, threatening to boycott Dreamspeakers and start their own competing film festival if their demands were not met; five of the six titles were ultimately pulled from the festival at the last minute, with the Alliance backing down only on the high-profile documentary film Incident at Oglala. John Paskievich, the director of the dropped film Sedna: The Making of a Myth, criticized the decision, asking "How much of a percentage of native content do you need to have? Do you need to submit to blood tests?", and Peter von Puttkamer criticized the exclusion of his films The Spirit of the Mask and Kecia: Words to Live By, calling special attention to the educational importance of Kecia as a documentary about a young First Nations girl living with HIV/AIDS.

The festival's organizing committee and film selection process were restructured in response to the controversy before the second event was staged in 1993, and most later coverage of the festival has treated 1993 rather than 1992 as the launch date of the festival in its current form.

For financial reasons, the festival was not staged in 1999 after failing to secure an arts grant from the city of Edmonton. It was revived in 2003 as a programming stream within the city's Global Visions Film Festival, before being officially relaunched as a separate event again in 2004.

The festival also coordinates the Dreamspeakers Walk of Honour, a public walk of fame in the city's Beaver Hills House Park devoted to distinguished Canadian indigenous people.

In 2021 Christine Sokaymoh Frederick, Dreamspeakers’ executive director and team moved the programme of 35 films online after cancelling in 2020 due to the COVID19 pandemic.
