= Mohawk Girls (TV series) =

- Genre: Comedy drama
- Created by: Tracey Deer
- Written by: Cynthia Knight, Tracey Deer
- Directed by: Tracey Deer
- Starring: Jennifer Pudavick; Heather White; Maika Harper; Allyson Pratt; Brittany LeBorgne; Meegwun Fairbrother; Glen Gould; Kyle Nobess; Jimmy Blais
- Country of origin: Canada
- Original language: English
- No. of seasons: 5
- No. of episodes: 30

Original release
- Network: OMNI Television; APTN
- Release: November 23, 2014 – December 19, 2017

Mohawk Girls is a Canadian comedy-drama series developed by Tracey Deer based on her 2005 documentary Mohawk Girls. The program premiered on OMNI Television and on APTN in the fall of 2014 and entered its fourth season in 2016. It is available for streaming on CBC Gem and it was picked up by the Peacock streaming service in 2021.

Deer describes the series as "Sex and the City for the Native set".

== Development and production ==
At age 17, Tracey Deer had met Brittany LeBorgne and Heather White while working as their camp counselor and told them that one day she would create a TV show for them to star in. In 2005 she created a documentary film, Mohawk Girls, which in 2010 she developed into an outline for the television series, and created a pilot.

In 2012 the show was greenlit for development. Kaniehtiio Horn, who played Bailey in the pilot, was replaced by Jennifer Pudavick when the filming of the first seven episodes began in Montreal, under Deer's direction. On February 18, 2014, well before the first season had premiered, six more episodes were approved.

== Original release ==
Mohawk Girls premiered on OMNI Television on November 23, 2014, and on APTN on November 25, 2014. The two seasons aired as a continuous run of 13 episodes beginning in 2014. In May 2015, APTN announced that the series was being renewed for a third season. It was renewed again for a fourth season in August 2016. The creators wrapped up the show in the fifth and final season, which started airing in November 2017.

== Plot ==
The show follows three best friends in their late twenties living in Kahnawake: Bailey, Caitlin and Zoe. The women are joined by newcomer Anna, who is of mixed Mohawk descent.

=== Season 1 ===
The series begins with Bailey moving into her aunt's house after her uncle runs off with a younger woman. Bailey is in a serious relationship with Thunder, but after she introduces him to her father she learns that they are actually cousins. Bailey begins the search for a new boyfriend but finds the Mohawk men she meets dull.

Meanwhile, Caitlin falls in love with Butterhead, a sleazy lacrosse player who already has two children with two different women. Though she is able to separate him from his partner she struggles to keep his attention when younger women begin flirting with him.

Zoe, a successful lawyer, struggles against parental pressure to uphold her image and be a flawless example for the Mohawk community.

After years spent in New York Anna returns to Kahnawake and finds that the small community is less than welcoming to a free-spirited vlogger.

=== Season 2 ===
The second season follows the women as their love lives become messier.

Bailey, who finally stands up to her friends and family and brings Jack to meet them, is crushed when Jack breaks up with her after her family threatens him.

Caitlin becomes pregnant with Butterhead's child. While she is initially terrified at the prospect of being a single mother, she finds that Butterhead isn't much better as an involved father when they move into his mother's home.

Zoe fully embraces her fetish side and becomes involved in the bondage scene.

Anna begins dating Thunder after finally standing up to Bailey but faces the disapproval of everyone else inside the community and develops PTSD after being jumped by Vicky.

=== Season 3 ===
Bailey has an affair with Lollipop's husband but eventually ends it and decides to move back to the reservation to refocus her life. She focuses on finding a Mohawk man once again.

Caitlin has mixed feelings about aborting her child with Butterhead but eventually focuses on self-improvement and leaves Butterhead.

Zoe deals with the consequences of her freakout at Lollipop's wedding by ingratiating herself to her and even getting a boyfriend to prove she can be normal and not uptight.

Anna reunites with Thunder and continues to learn more about Mohawk culture despite being exposed as being only 48% Mohawk.

=== Season 4 ===
Bailey navigates wedding planning, commitment, and living with Watio. This is hard when she also has growing feelings for her painting instructor, James in Montreal. She also tries to break into a real career, but struggles.

Caitlin is appreciating the respect and encouragement she has from her flourishing relationship with Leon, unfortunately, her family and community are not supportive of her dating a black man.

Zoe begins seeing a psychologist who believes Zoe is dealing with a sex addiction, but Zoe denies this. She decides to run for Chief and get a boyfriend to make up for not showing up to a fundraiser she planned poorly; this does not go as well as she would have liked when she tries to balance her career and personal life with a "Master" in Montreal.

Anna tries to fit in with the community, and does better when she drops out of school and disrespects her white mother in front of the town. This leads to Thunder breaking up with her, and Anna gradually loses more and more as she tries to prove she deserves the name "Fauxhawk" instead of "Hat girl".

== Cast and characters ==
=== Main ===
- Jennifer Pudavick as Bailey, a woman in her late-twenties who works at a cigarette factory. She was seriously dating Thunder and considering marrying him before she discovered he was her second cousin. Through Anna, she meets Jack, a Montreal musician who she is attracted to, but struggles against her desire to date him as she only wants to date Mohawk men and dating a white man would mean she would be shunned by the community.
- Heather White as Caitlin, a hairdresser with self-esteem issues who is in love with Butterhead.
- Maika Harper as Anna, a young philosophy student at McGill University whose father was Mohawk but whose mother was white. She moves back to Kahnawake in order to stay with her family and reconnect with her culture but is frequently ostracized and has difficulty conforming to the correct behaviour.
- Brittany LeBorgne as Zoe, a type-A lawyer who is pushed to succeed by her demanding mother. To let off steam she begins a casual sexual relationship with a man she meets online.

=== Recurring ===
- Meegwun Fairbrother as Butterhead, a promiscuous lacrosse player.
- Rachelle White Wind as Vicky, one of Butterhead's baby mamas and sometimes a bully
- Kyle Nobess as Thunder, a cop who also works as a Mohawk teacher.
- Allyson Pratt as Iostha, the local "bad girl" and bully.
- Glen Gould as Sose, Bailey's father.
- Dwain Murphy as Leon, a city friend of Anna's
- Jimmy Blais as Watio, a former construction worker who was on welfare for political reasons but eventually became a cashier
- Jeffrey Wetsch as James, an artist and painting instructor in Montreal
- Lawrence Bayne as Caitlin's Dad
- Leelee Greene as Gossip Girl Anna's cousin
