= White savior narrative in film =

The white savior is a cinematic trope in which a white central character rescues non-white (often less prominent) characters from unfortunate circumstances. This recurs in an array of genres in American cinema, wherein a white protagonist is portrayed as a messianic figure who often gains some insight or introspection in the course of rescuing non-white characters (or occasionally non-human alien races that substitute as non-white civilizations) from their plight.

The narrative trope of the white savior is one way the mass communications medium of cinema represents the sociology of race and ethnic relations, by presenting abstract concepts such as morality as characteristics innate, racially and culturally, to white people, not to be found in non-white people. This white savior is often portrayed as a man who is out of place within his own society, until he assumes the burden of racial leadership to rescue non-white minorities and foreigners from their suffering. As such, white savior stories have been described as "essentially grandiose, exhibitionistic, and narcissistic" fantasies of psychological compensation.

== Trope ==
In "The Whiteness of Oscar Night" (2015), Matthew Hughey describes the narrative structure of the subgenre:

A White Savior film is often based on some supposedly true story. Second, it features a nonwhite group or person who experiences conflict and struggle with others that is particularly dangerous or threatening to their life and livelihood. Third, a White person (the savior) enters the milieu and through their sacrifices, as a teacher, mentor, lawyer, military hero, aspiring writer, or wannabe Native American warrior, is able to physically save—or at least morally redeem—the person or community of folks of color, by the film's end. Examples of this genre include films like Glory (1989), Dangerous Minds (1995), Amistad (1997), Finding Forrester (2000), The Last Samurai (2003), Half Nelson (2006), Freedom Writers (2007), Gran Torino (2008), Avatar (2009), The Blind Side (2009), The Help (2011).

The films of the blaxploitation genre of the 1970s reflected discontent over the social and racial inequality of non-white people in the United States and functioned as counterbalance to the trope of the white savior. According to some scholars, such as Peter Lang, continued cultural hypersegregation in the 1980s led to the common belief, by many American white people, that the nation had reached a post-racial state of social relations, which resulted in a backlash against the racial and ethnic diversity of the cinema of the previous decades, on screen during the 1960s and the 1970s; thus, the popular cinema of the 1990s and the early 2000s featured the white savior narrative. That reappearance of the white-savior narrative occurred because the majority of white people in the United States had little substantive social interaction with people of different races and ethnic groups.

The White Savior trope's prevalence continues in often critically acclaimed films. Joseph Vogel writes of the trope in Django Unchained:

In the crucial climactic scene, the pattern of white centrality holds. It is [the white doctor] Schultz, not [the freed slave] Django, who, racked by conscience kills Calvin Candie, and in doing so, sacrifices his own life. When asked by Henry Louis Gates, Jr. why he decided to make King Schultz the Christ figure, Tarantino claimed he was simply drawing on the tropes of the western.

A study of 50 films between 1987 and 2011 deemed to be white savior films found that 36% of studied films were produced by the 6 major studios (Sony, Universal, Paramount, Twentieth Century Fox/Fox Searchlight, or Warner Brothers). These films are also responsible for a plurality of the major awards in this time period.

== Types of story ==
=== Inspirational teacher ===
The white-savior teacher story, such as Up the Down Staircase (1967), Dangerous Minds (1995), and Freedom Writers (2007), "features a group of lower-class, urban, non-whites (generally Black and Latino/a) who struggle through the social order in general, or the educational system specifically. Yet, through the sacrifices of a white teacher they are transformed, saved, and redeemed by the film's end." The storyline of the white-savior-teacher is not racist, in itself, but could be considered culturally problematic as a variant of the white-savior narrative that allegedly overlooks the efforts of minority-group teachers who have been successfully educating minority-group students in their communities.

Welcome Back, Kotter is a 1970s television series about the education system that has been described by critics as having white savior themes.

The 1967 British drama To Sir, with Love is notable for inverting the white savior concept. Sidney Poitier stars as a Black teacher who accepts a teaching position in an inner city school where the class consists of troubled, delinquent, white British youth.

=== Man of principle ===
The white savior's principled opposition to chattel slavery and to Jim Crow laws makes him advocate for the humanity of slaves and defender of the rights of Black people unable to independently stand within an institutionally racist society, in films such as To Kill a Mockingbird (1962), Conrack (1974), and Amistad (1997). Despite being stories about the racist oppression of Black people, the white-savior narrative relegates non-white characters to the story's background, as the passive object(s) of the dramatic action. In the foreground it places the white man who militates to save the non-white characters from the depredations of racist white folk. Respectively, aspects can include: a false accusation of inter-racial rape, truncated schooling, and chattel slavery.

== List of associated films ==
Film	Year	Description
12 Years a Slave	2013	In the historical film set in 1841 onward, free-born African American Solomon Northup (played by Chiwetel Ejiofor) is kidnapped and sold into slavery. In the film's denouement, a white Canadian (played by Brad Pitt) rescues Northup from enslavement. While 12 Years a Slave focuses mainly on Northup's resilience, and a Canadian did in reality rescue Northup, the film was identified as a cinematic representation of slavery that depicted a white savior. The Atlantic's Noah Berlatsky said the denouement's use of the white savior, while historically accurate, was unnecessary, "As it is, in the context of Hollywood, Northup's stunned/numb gratitude at the end of the film tends to blur into a montage of other teary-eyed black actors gazing with awe and wonder at the surprising, over-determined nobility of some white actor or other."
42	2013	Based on a true story, the white baseball executive Branch Rickey (played by Harrison Ford) selects the first African-American Major League baseball player of the modern era, Jackie Robinson (played by Chadwick Boseman), to play for the Brooklyn Dodgers.
The Air Up There	1994	A disgraced white basketball coach (played by Kevin Bacon) travels to a village in Kenya to recruit a prospective player.
Amistad	1997	In the 1830s, a group of African slaves who rise up against their captors are captured by the U.S. military, and a legal battle ensues in which the white lawyer John Quincy Adams (played by Anthony Hopkins) defends their right to be freed. This is based on the true story of La Amistad, and Adams did in fact argue their case before the Supreme Court in United States v. The Amistad.
Avatar	2009	In the science fiction film, a white former Marine (played by Sam Worthington) goes to another planet and becomes part of an alien humanoid tribe, ultimately leading them to victory against his people's military.
Basmati Blues	2018	A white American scientist (played by Brie Larson) is sent to India by her employer to sell genetically modified rice to the locals.
The Blind Side	2009	A white woman and football fan (played by Sandra Bullock) takes a black teenager (played by Quinton Aaron) into her home, and he plays football with her support through his high school and college years. The film is based on the real life of football player Michael Oher, who criticized the film for simplifying his struggles and exaggerating Leigh Anne Tuohy's role in the events. Oher also believed the film sugarcoated his relationship with the Tuohy family and ignored racial tensions.
Blood Diamond	2006	A black man (played by Djimon Hounsou) and his son from Sierra Leone are saved by a white Rhodesian mercenary (played by Leonardo DiCaprio) from the Revolutionary United Front during the country's civil war.
City of Joy	1992	A white American doctor (played by Patrick Swayze) travels to India to find enlightenment. He sets up a free clinic to serve the poor; though reluctant at first, he decides to stay with the people.
Conrack	1974	A white teacher (played by Jon Voight) is sent to an island off the coast of South Carolina, where he teaches children of poor black families. This was based on the account of author Pat Conroy, who taught black students on Daufuskie Island for the 1969–1970 school year and detailed his experiences in his 1972 book The Water Is Wide.
Cool Runnings	1993	Loosely based on the 1988 Jamaican Olympic bobsled team, black Jamaicans want to form a national bobsled team and are helped by a white former bobsledder (played by John Candy).
Cry Freedom	1987	The film features white journalist Donald Woods (played by Kevin Kline) who learns to appreciate the anti-apartheid movement in South Africa and its black leader Stephen Biko (played by Denzel Washington). Woods leaves the country to report the apartheid system to the world.
Dances with Wolves	1990	In the 1860s, a white American Union soldier (played by Kevin Costner) becomes part of the Sioux, a Native American tribe. He leads the Sioux against their rivals, the Pawnee, and later helps them escape the army he once served.
Dangerous Minds	1995	A white teacher (played by Michelle Pfeiffer) teaches African and Hispanic American teenagers at an inner-city high school. The film is based on the autobiography My Posse Don't Do Homework by LouAnne Johnson.
District 9	2009	A white South African government official (played by Sharlto Copley) works to relocate extraterrestrials to a new internment camp. When he is infected by a fluid and gradually changes into an extraterrestrial himself, he fights against the transition and is motivated to free extraterrestrials so they can provide a cure for his condition.
Django Unchained	2012	In 1858, black slave Django (played by Jamie Foxx) is freed by the white German bounty hunter Schultz (played by Christoph Waltz), and they work together to free Django's wife.
Dune	1984	Both David Lynch's and Denis Villeneuve's adaptations of Frank Herbert's novel Dune have been described as white savior stories. Critics allege that Paul Atreides is a foreign white savior who arrives and takes charge of the local Fremen and leads them to victory against their colonial invaders. However, this accusation remains controversial, as Herbert's original novel is considered a critique of messianic archetypes and the white savior tropes they inspire.
Dune	2021	Both David Lynch's and Denis Villeneuve's adaptations of Frank Herbert's novel Dune have been described as white savior stories. Critics allege that Paul Atreides is a foreign white savior who arrives and takes charge of the local Fremen and leads them to victory against their colonial invaders. However, this accusation remains controversial, as Herbert's original novel is considered a critique of messianic archetypes and the white savior tropes they inspire.
Elysium	2013	In the science fiction film, a white assembly worker (played by Matt Damon) from a mostly non-white community travels to a space station and ends up sacrificing himself so medical devices could be used to heal people on Earth.
The Express: The Ernie Davis Story	2008	Based on the true story of Ernie Davis and the 1959 Syracuse Orangemen football team. The story focuses on the relationship between white head coach Ben Schwartzwalder (played by Dennis Quaid) and Davis.
Finding Forrester	2000	A white reclusive writer (played by Sean Connery) sees potential writing skill in a black high school student (played by Rob Brown) and helps him with his writing.
Free State of Jones	2016	The historical film, set during the American Civil War, stars Matthew McConaughey as Newton Knight, a Confederate Army deserter who leads fellow deserters and freed slaves to fight against the Confederates.
Freedom Writers	2007	In the mid-1990s in Long Beach, California, a white teacher (played by Hilary Swank) strives to educate non-white high school students despite their neighborhood conditions.
Glory Road	2006	In the 1960s, men's basketball coach Don Haskins (Josh Lucas) coaches a team with an all-black starting lineup and leads them to victory. The film is based on the true story of the 1965–66 Texas Western Miners men's basketball team.
Gran Torino	2008	A racist white Korean War veteran (played by Clint Eastwood) helps a Hmong American teenager and ultimately protects him and his family from a Hmong American gang.
The Great Wall	2017	William (played by Matt Damon) is a white European mercenary who travels to China in search of gunpowder. He stumbles upon the Chinese army fighting against alien monsters and helps them save China. Actress Constance Wu noted one day after the launch of the film's trailer, "We have to stop perpetuating the racist myth that only a white man can save the world. It's not based in actual fact. Our heroes don't look like Matt Damon." After the film's release, Ann Hornaday, chief film critic for the Washington Post, writes that "early concerns about Damon playing a 'white savior' in the film turn out to be unfounded: his character, a mercenary soldier, is heroic, but also clearly a foil for the superior principles and courage of his Chinese allies." Jonathan Kim, in a review for the Huffington Post, writes that "having seen The Great Wall, I can say that...on the charge of The Great Wall insulting the Chinese and promoting white superiority, I say: Not Guilty. The question of whether The Great Wall is a white savior movie is a bit trickier, but I'm still going to say Not Guilty. ...On the charge of whitewashing, I say: Not Guilty."
The Greatest Showman	2017	A musical following P. T. Barnum (played by Hugh Jackman) and his creation of the Barnum & Bailey Circus. Kristen Lopez of The Daily Beast opined that the film utilizes white savior narrative for disabled people rather than racial minorities, and that Barnum's portrayal "not only flies in the face of history—Barnum profited off the disabled for years—but it's also undermined by the film's narrative, which can't present Barnum as the unlikable, capitalist phenom he truly was." Conversely, Scott Mendelson of Forbes argues that "Ironically, since the movie gives us very little time with Jackman interacting with his star attractions, the movie avoids the whole 'white savior' thing", further saying "it is through their own bonding that they become a surrogate family".
The Green Berets	1968	A Vietnam War film depicts a white U.S. Army Special Forces commander (played by John Wayne) who fights for the people of South Vietnam.
Green Book	2018	Italian American bouncer Tony Lip (played by Viggo Mortensen) serves as a driver and bodyguard for African American classical and jazz pianist Don Shirley (played by Mahershala Ali). Cultural critics have described the depiction of Shirley as a magical negro trope.
The Grizzlies	2018	The true story of a white teacher who launched a lacrosse team to combat an epidemic of youth suicide in the predominantly Inuit community of Kugluktuk, Nunavut. Director Miranda de Pencier was conscious of the potentially problematic racial aspect to the story, and worked with Inuit producers Alethea Arnaquq-Baril and Stacey Aglok Macdonald to ensure that the screenplay centred the perspective of Inuit youth and did not fall into white savior tropes; however, the film has still been analyzed by some film critics through a white savior lens.
Half Nelson	2006	A white teacher with a drug addiction (played by Ryan Gosling) teaches at an inner city middle school, and befriending a black student, learns to overcome his addiction.
Hardball	2001	A white gambler (played by Keanu Reeves) is required to coach a baseball team of black children from Chicago's ABLA housing projects to pay off his gambling debts.
The Harlem Globetrotters	1951	A fictionalized portrayal of the basketball team of the same name and a white coach (played by Thomas Gomez) who kickstarts the team.
The Help	2011	In 1963 in Jackson, Mississippi, a young white woman (played by Emma Stone) strives for a career in journalism and encourages black maids to share their personal experiences despite the racism prevalent at the time. This has been described as an example of a white main character exploiting the lives of underserved African American's to financially benefit herself without giving much relief to that community.
Hidden Figures	2016	Based on the book of the same name, the film follows three African-American women at NASA in 1961 and features one of the women's white bosses (played by Kevin Costner) standing up for her to use the nearest bathroom instead of a farther one intended only for her race. He also lets her into Mission Control to witness the launch. Neither scene happened in real life, and screenwriter Theodore Melfi said he saw no problem with adding the scenes, explaining: "There needs to be white people who do the right thing, there needs to be black people who do the right thing, and someone does the right thing. And so who cares who does the right thing, as long as the right thing is achieved?"
Indiana Jones and the Temple of Doom	1984	White archaeologist and adventurer Indiana Jones (played by Harrison Ford) rescues Indian peasants from a cult that sacrifices them.
Isle of Dogs	2018	Amid a canine influenza outbreak in a dystopian Japanese city, an American exchange student and pro-dog activist leads the investigation of a conspiracy that the city's authoritarian, cat-loving mayor created the flu as part of a plot to annihilate all of the city's exiled dogs. The student later helps a pack of dogs expose the mayor's corruption by recovering the serum that cures the dog flu.
The Jackie Robinson Story	1950	The white president of the Major League Baseball league, Clyde Sukeforth, gives baseball player Jackie Robinson the opportunity to be the first black player in the segregated MLB.
Jim Thorpe – All-American	1951	Based on the life of Jim Thorpe, white coach Glenn S. "Pop" Warner (played by Charles Bickford) helps a native-American athlete (played by white actor Burt Lancaster) compete at the 1912 Olympics.
Kingdom of Heaven	2005	A fictionalized retelling of Balian of Ibelin, a French crusader (played by Orlando Bloom) inherits a fief in the kingdom of Jerusalem. With his knowledge and local workers, he irrigates his dry land to the joy of the inhabitants. He later negotiates for peace with Saladin.
The Last Face	2016	A film directed by Sean Penn which features white doctors in West Africa. IndieWire reported, "Critics chided Penn for making a treacly white-savior movie that attempts to shame its audience with bloody war imagery."
The Last Samurai	2003	In the 1870s, a white former American Union Army officer (played by Tom Cruise) travels to Japan and ultimately joins a group of samurai, helping them to resist corrupt advisers to the Japanese Emperor.
Lawrence of Arabia	1962	Based on the real life of white British Army officer T. E. Lawrence (played by Peter O'Toole), who led Arabs in a revolt against the Ottoman Empire.
The Legend of Tarzan	2016	Tarzan, a white man (played by Alexander Skarsgård) is raised by apes in Africa and then travels to England. He eventually returns to Africa and fights against the slave trade.
Lincoln	2012	The historical film focuses on the efforts of President of the United States Abraham Lincoln (played by Daniel Day-Lewis) and other white figures to win the American Civil War and end Slavery in the United States. Historian Kate Masur found that Spielberg took liberties with the historical record and said, "For some 30 years, historians have been demonstrating that slaves were crucial agents in their emancipation." Masur said that in the film, "African-American characters do almost nothing but passively wait for white men to liberate them."
Machine Gun Preacher	2011	Based on the real life of Sam Childers, a white ex-convict (played by Gerard Butler) travels to South Sudan to rebuild homes and finds himself having to save its residents from soldiers involved in a civil war.
The Magnificent Seven	1960	A group of hired guns/mercenaries are recruited by a group of Mexican villagers to defend them against a marauding gang of Mexican bandits. At the end, the leader Chris (played by Yul Brynner) looking down at the graves of fallen comrades tells the survivors: "The Old Man was right. Only the farmers won. We lost. We'll always lose." It is based on Seven Samurai, a film in which the samurai save commoners.
A Man Called Horse	1970	The story of an English aristocrat (played by Richard Harris) who is captured, tortured and then adopted by the Sioux and eventually becomes their leader. "Even the so-called authentic movies like A Man Called Horse — that's the whitest of movies I've ever seen."
The Man Who Would Be King	1975	Based on the story The Man Who Would Be King (1888) by Rudyard Kipling, two white adventurers (played by Sean Connery and Michael Caine) in the 1880s are crowned kings in the Afghan nation of Kafiristan. While the narrative is depicted as ironic due to the white men's arrogance and death, critics argue the Afghans are portrayed in a clichéd manner.
The Matrix	1999	The science fiction film features the white computer hacker Neo, who becomes "The One" to save humanity. Sociologist Matthew Hughey in his book The White Savior Film says the film has a white protagonist "entering... the multicultural landscapes outside computer-simulated reality [and] must begin, through his grace, to save non-white people from an impending disaster." Hernan and Vera in their book Screen Saviors: Hollywood Fictions of Whiteness describe Neo as "the white messiah [who] has a racially diverse team of helpers". They say, "The movie's potential critique of white racism is contradicted by the mythic plot, in which the black characters—Morpheus, the Oracle, and Morpheus's crew members Tank and Dozer—are disciples who serve the white Messiah Neo." Adilifu Nama in his book Black Space: Imagining Race in Science Fiction Film said of Morpheus and the Oracle's key roles, "On the whole, the quest... appears to be more a mission led by a black man and woman than one led by a white savior... the black characters are easily read as symbolic cultural touchstones and respective reminders of the civil rights and Black Power movements." The lead role was originally offered to Will Smith.
McFarland, USA	2015	Based on a true story, Jim White, a white coach (played by Kevin Costner) trains an all-Latino high school cross country running team. The Atlantic said, "[It] has invoked some groans among critics who recognize its 'white savior' premise. Some say it transcends its paradigmatic trappings—others have claimed it's a film about easing white people into a more diverse America." Director Niki Caro said, "We were very conscious of not making a white savior movie, and you could have with the material, but it was really important for us that he be a flawed guy who was ultimately redeemed by the community. You see him become a better coach, a better father and a better man through his interaction with this place and these people."
Million Dollar Arm	2014	Based on the true story of Rinku Singh and Dinesh Patel, sports agent J. B. Bernstein (played by Jon Hamm) organizes a talent contest in India where he discovers a pair of youngsters who will demonstrate enough baseball skills to receive a contract by the Pittsburgh Pirates.
Mississippi Burning	1988	In 1964, two white FBI agents (played by Gene Hackman and Willem Dafoe) travel to Mississippi to investigate the murders of Chaney, Goodman, and Schwerner, civil rights organizers of whom one was black. They are depicted as heroes in the black struggle. Director Alan Parker said of the casting, "Because it’s a movie, I felt it had to be fictionalized. The two heroes in the story had to be white. That is a reflection of our society as much as of the film industry. At this point in time, it could not have been made in any other way."
Music of the Heart	1999	Based on the true story of Roberta Guaspari, a white music teacher (played by Meryl Streep) teaches non-white students at an inner city school.
Our Brand Is Crisis	2015	In the comedy-drama film, a white political consultant (played Sandra Bullock) helps a Bolivian politician win the presidential election in his country.
The Principal	1987	A white teacher (played by Jim Belushi) teaches non-white students at an inner city school.
Radio	2003	A white high school football coach (played by Ed Harris) helps a mentally handicapped black football fan (played by Cuba Gooding Jr.) become more involved with the team.
The Red Sea Diving Resort	2019	A thriller film features Jewish heroes from Israel who save Ethiopian-Jewish refugees from Africa.
Remember the Titans	2000	Based on the true story of football coach Herman Boone, a white high school football coach (played by Will Patton) gives preferential help to the school's black players and helps the black football coach (played by Denzel Washington) during a game that has been rigged by the white referees.
The Revenant	2015	A white frontiersman seeks revenge for the death of his half-indigenous son after being abandoned by his company of fur trappers in near death condition.
The Ron Clark Story	2006	A white teacher (played by Matthew Perry) moves from a small town to New York City to make a difference in the lives of non-white students.
Same Kind of Different as Me	2017	A wealthy businessman (played by Greg Kinnear) reluctantly joins his wife (played by Renée Zellweger) who volunteers at a homeless shelter where they develop a friendship with a homeless man played by Djimon Hounsou.
Snow Falling on Cedars	1999	A white journalist (played by Ethan Hawke) possesses information that can exonerate a Japanese-American fisherman (played by Rick Yune) on trial for murder.
The Soloist	2009	A white man (played by Robert Downey Jr.) helps a black mentally handicapped and homeless man (played by Jamie Foxx) revive his passion and skill in music.
Sound of Freedom	2023	Based on the life of Tim Ballard, a white Homeland Security agent (Jim Caviezel) attempts to rescue a child from sex traffickers in Colombia.
Stargate	1994	In the science fiction film, a white Egyptologist and linguist (played by James Spader) and a white military colonel (played by Kurt Russell) rescue a non-white population on an alien planet from their extraterrestrial slavers.
Sunset Park	1996	A white physical education teacher (played by Rhea Perlman) coaches a basketball team of black players, taking them to the city championships.
Tears of the Sun	2003	A white commander of the United States Navy SEALs (played by Bruce Willis) decides to save the Nigerian refugees from advancing rebel troops, in violation of their primary and secondary orders.
A Time to Kill	1996	In rural Mississippi, a white lawyer named Jake Brigance (played by Matthew McConaughey) is appointed to defend Carl Lee Hailey (played by Samuel L. Jackson), a black man accused of murdering two white supremacists that raped his 10-year-old daughter Tanya. This is based on the John Grisham novel A Time to Kill.
To Kill a Mockingbird	1962	A white attorney (played by Gregory Peck) defends a black man falsely accused of rape; he loses the case but is applauded for his noble effort. Based on the Harper Lee book To Kill a Mockingbird.
The Warriors Gate	2016	A white teenager (played by Uriah Shelton) is transported to China and becomes a kung fu warrior to rescue a princess (played by Ni Ni) from villains.
When the Storm Fades	2018	In part a critical satire of white savior narratives, the film's storyline includes two Canadian aid workers in the Philippines whose attempts to play the saviors in the aftermath of Typhoon Haiyan are counterproductive.
Wildcats	1986	A white woman (played by Goldie Hawn) becomes the coach of an inner city football team and leads them to a championship.
Wind River	2017	A white U.S. Fish and Wildlife Service tracker and a white FBI agent, try to solve a murder on the Wind River Indian Reservation in Wyoming.

== See also ==
- Magical Negro
  - List of Magical Negro occurrences in fiction
- Noble savage
- "The White Man's Burden"
- Whitewashing in film
- White gods

== Bibliography ==
- Vera, Hernán; Gordon, Andrew M. (2003). "The Beautiful White American: Sincere Fictions of the Savior". Screen Saviors: Hollywood Fictions of Whiteness. Lanham, Maryland: Rowman & Littlefield Publishers. ISBN 978-1-4616-4286-2.
