= Twice Colonized =

2023 Canadian documentary film

- Film poster
- Directed by: Lin Alluna
- Written by: Lin Alluna; Aaju Peter
- Produced by: Emile Hertling Péronard; Alethea Arnaquq-Baril; Stacey Aglok Macdonald; Bob Moore
- Starring: Aaju Peter
- Cinematography: Lin Alluna; David Bauer; Glauco Bermudez; Iris Ng
- Edited by: Mark Bukdahl
- Music by: Olivier Alary; Johannes Malfatti; Celina Kalluk
- Production companies: Ánorâk Film; Red Marrow Media; EyeSteelFilm
- Release date: January 23, 2023 (Sundance)
- Running time: 91 minutes
- Countries: Canada; Denmark; Greenland
- Languages: English; Danish; Greenlandic; Inuktitut

Twice Colonized is a documentary film, directed by Lin Alluna and released in 2023. The film is a co-production of companies from Canada, Denmark and Greenland, and profiles Aaju Peter, an Inuk lawyer and activist who has lived in both Greenland and Nunavut, documenting both her activism for Inuit rights and her personal struggles.

The film premiered in January 2023 at the 2023 Sundance Film Festival. It had its Danish premiere in March as the opening film of the 2023 CPH:DOX film festival, and its Canadian premiere in April as the opening film of the 2023 Hot Docs Canadian International Documentary Festival.

At the 12th Canadian Screen Awards in 2024, the film won the Canadian Screen Award for Best Feature Length Documentary, and Alary and Malfatti were nominated for Best Original Music in a Documentary.

== Synopsis ==
Twice Colonized documents Inuk lawyer Aaju Peter. Inuit have been "twice colonized"—first by Danish settlers in Greenland, and then by modern-day Canadian policies and institutions. As an activist, she defends the human rights of Indigenous peoples of the Arctic, urging Westerners to reflect on their history of colonization. While she advocates to establish an Indigenous forum at the European Union, she embarks on a personal journey regarding the loss of her youngest son.

The film was made over a seven year period by director Lin Alluna and co-writer Aaju Peter. It is the first co-production between Inuit across colonial borders. The financing had to be set up through the co-production treaty between the colonizing nations of Canada and Denmark to fund the film.

Arnaquq-Baril had previously made the 2016 film Angry Inuk, which began as a documentary about Peter, but evolved into an issue-based film including but not entirely centred on Peter, as Arnaquq-Baril struggled to depict a more personal side of Peter's life. In an interview with The Guardian, Peter says: "In this one I wanted everything shown, (...) and how hard it has been for me to be colonized and to reclaim myself. I wanted Lin to show all the good all the bad and everything in between."

== Release ==
The film was broadcast by CBC Television on September 13, 2023, as the season premiere of the documentary series The Passionate Eye.

== Critical response ==
Twice Colonized received positive reviews from critics at Variety, The Guardian, Screen Daily, and Exclaim! Guy Lodge of Variety calls it a character study that "has a curiosity and a complexity that distinguish it from various other admiring activist portraits in the documentary sphere."

Veronica Esposito of The Guardian notes that director Alluna finds "scenes and images that implicate numerous sides of her subject, while drawing in the web of relationships and power structures that surround her."

== Festivals ==
=== 2023 ===
Sundance Film Festival, CPH:DOX, Hot Docs, Doc Edge IDFF, Movies That Matter Film Festival, Crossing Europe, Millenium Docs Against Gravity, Ecofalante Environmental Film Festival in Sao Paulo, Docudays, Sydney Film festival, Sheffield doc fest, Maine International Film Festival, Jerusalem film festival, Galway film Fleadh, Durban Film Festival, Dokufest, Makedox, Oslo:PIX, Reykjavik International Film Festival, Planet on, In Our Own Words Film Festival, International Human Rights Film Festival Albania, Women Make Docs, Dochouse London, Syracuse University Human Rights Film Festival, Nordisk Panorama, Human Rights Film Festival Berlin, Riga International Film Festival, Women's World Film Festival, Filmfest FrauenWelten, Nordische Filmtage Lübeck, Festival dei Popoli International Film Festival, One World Human Rights Film Festival, Northern Lights Film Festival Belarus, IU Cinema, Cinema verite Iran International Film Festival, This Human World Film Festival.

=== 2024 ===
FIFP, Anthropological Film Festival, DocPoint Helsinki, Afro-Asian Institute Salzburg, Estonian National Art Museum, One World Human Rights Prague Film Festival, Mâoriland Film Festival, UCD - Ireland's Global University, Human Rights Film Festival Zürich, Scandinavian Film Days Bonn, LSE University, CIRCLE Women Doc accelerator, Evia Film Project (Thessaloniki film festival), Haugesund International Film Festival, Oslo Pix, Helsinki International Film Festival, Cinemateket i Tromsø, BIFED, Beholders Film Festival.

== Awards and honors ==
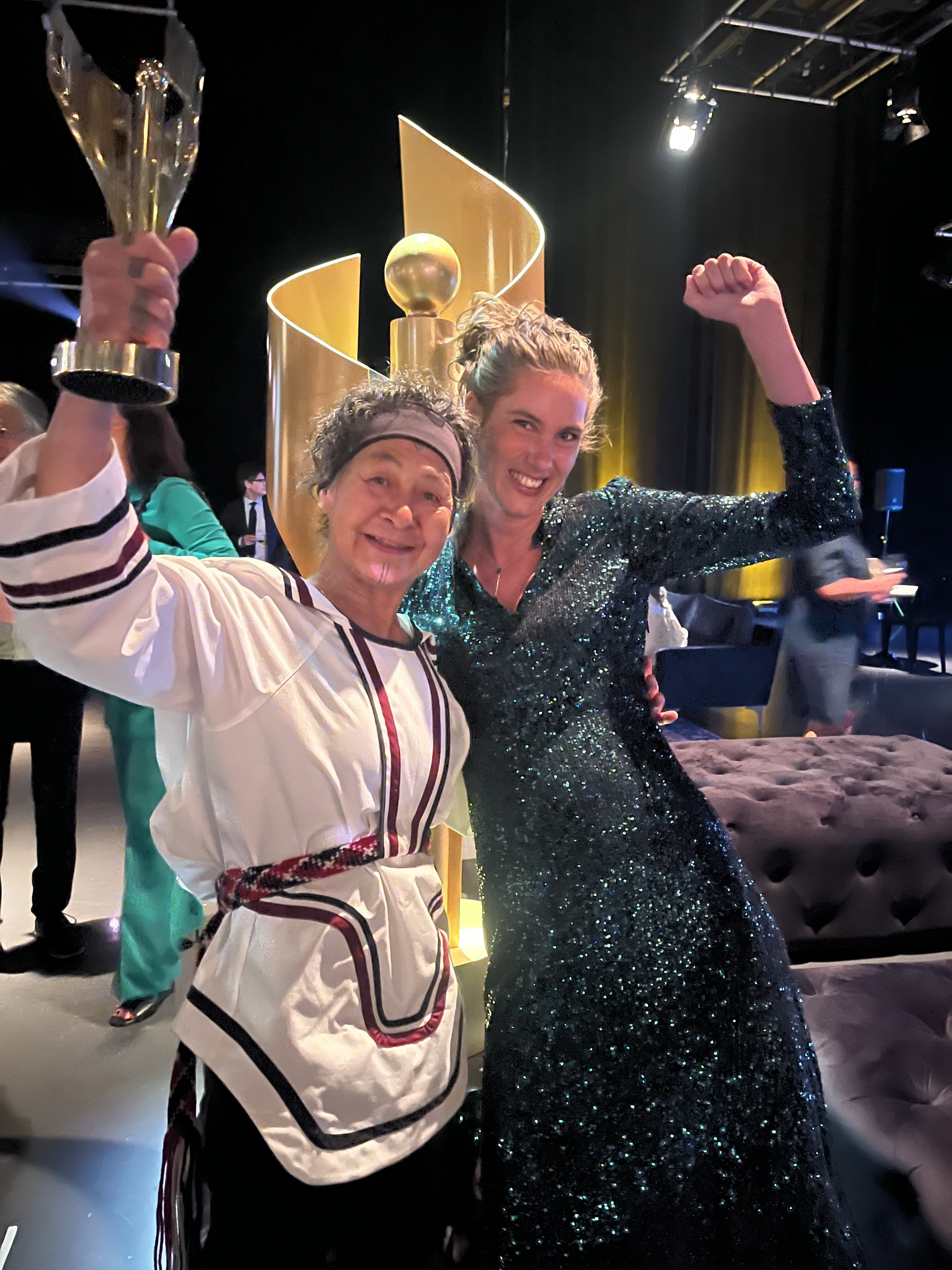
Activist Aaju Peter with director Lin Alluna, after winning the best feature length documentary prize at the Canadian Screen Awards 2024 for Twice Colonized.

At the 12th Canadian Screen Awards in 2024, the film won the Canadian Screen Award for Best Feature Length Documentary, and Alary and Malfatti were nominated for Best Original Music in a Documentary.

Nominated for the Nordic Arts Council's Film Prize 2024.

Winner of Transparency Jury Prize at SIMA - Social Impact Media Awards 2024.

Aaju Peter was named a 2024 Unforgettables Honoree by Cinema Eye Honors after her performance in Twice Colonized.

The film won the Camera Justitia Award at the Movies That Matter documentary festival in The Hague.

Winner of Fighting Spirit Award and Special Mention Best International Feature at Doc Edge Festival 2023 in New Zealand.

Winner of second Rigoberta-Menchú Award at Montreal First Peoples' Festival 2023.

Winner of best documentary at Nuuk International Film Festival 2023.

Grand Jury Prize winner at Gimli Film Festival 2023.

Olivier Alary and Johannes Malfatti received a Prix Iris nomination for Best Original Music in a Documentary at the 25th Quebec Cinema Awards in 2023.

Winner of the best documentary at Oslo Pix Film Festival in 2023.

The film was nominated for best documentary at the Danish Academy Award Robert Prisen 2024 and the Danish Golden Globes Bodil 2024

== Pitch Awards ==
Winner of the Arctic Documentary Award for best political, environmental and cultural relevance at Tromsø International Filmfestival's North Pitch Below Zero 2019.

Winner of Corus prize and Surprise Prize at Hot Docs Forum 2019.

Winner of Cineuropa award / Cineuropa Marketing Prize for best pitch at DOK Leipzig 2020.

Winner of best pitch at Cannes docs-in-progress at Cannes Film Festival Marché du Film 2022. Handing out the prize, jury member Gugi Gumilang, executive director at In-Docs, said: "The project really struck a chord with the jury for its outstanding empathetic storytelling as it explores a strong woman who wants to change herself and the world. The film walks an emotional tightrope and asks us broader questions around our culpability in systems of inequality."
