= The Grizzlies =

2018 Canadian film

- Film poster
- Directed by: Miranda de Pencier
- Written by: Graham Yost; Moira Walley-Beckett
- Story by: Graham Yost
- Produced by: Alethea Arnaquq-Baril; Damon D'Oliveira; Miranda de Pencier; Zanne Devine; Stacey Aglok MacDonald
- Starring: Will Sasso; Ben Schnetzer; Tantoo Cardinal; Eric Schweig; Natar Ungalaaq; Booboo Stewart
- Cinematography: Jim Denault
- Edited by: Michele Conroy; Ronald Sanders; James Vandewater
- Music by: Garth Stevenson
- Distributed by: Mongrel Media
- Release dates: September 8, 2018 (TIFF); April 19, 2019 (Canada)
- Country: Canada
- Languages: English; Inuktitut
- Box office: $518,361

The Grizzlies is a 2018 Canadian sports drama film, directed by Miranda de Pencier. Based on a true story, the film depicts a youth lacrosse team that was set up to help combat an onslaught of youth suicide in the community of Kugluktuk, Nunavut.

The film's cast includes Will Sasso, Ben Schnetzer, Tantoo Cardinal, Eric Schweig, Emerald MacDonald, Natar Ungalaaq, Anna Lambe, Paul Nutarariaq, Booboo Stewart, and Madeline Ivalu.

The film premiered at the 2018 Toronto International Film Festival (TIFF). In October, de Pencier won the Directors Guild of Canada award for Best Direction in a Feature Film. The film was theatrically released in Canada on April 19, 2019, by Mongrel Media.

At the 7th Canadian Screen Awards, Dan General, Thomas Lambe, and Adam Tanuyak won the Canadian Screen Award for Best Original Song for "Trials". Nutarariaq was nominated for Best Actor, and Anna Lambe was nominated for Best Supporting Actress.

== Plot ==
In the small Arctic town of Kugluktuk, Nunavut, Russ Sheppard takes up a job as a history teacher to pay off his college debt to the Canadian government while waiting for an offer from St. Andrews, a prep school. His colleague Mike picks him up and almost hits a black dog.

In his first class, he meets Inuit students Miranda, Zach, Spring, Roger, and Kyle. His first day ends with absentees, cultural miscommunication, and a fist fight with Zach. Russ complains to principal Janace, but she is reluctant to punish him as their struggles are a result of their culture putting family first and unnecessary education last.

Russ and Mike see a funeral procession for a teen suicide which is the second of the month. That night, Russ hears an argument in the house across him, and sees Kyle running away. The next night, an injured Spring goes to Russ’ house, pursued by an inebriated Roger. Russ confronts him the next day, and dismisses his heartbreak over his girlfriend. Roger commits suicide.

Russ practices lacrosse at an abandoned cargo container and discovers Kyle is sleeping there. Russ gives him a key to the school so he can sleep inside.

Russ decides to form a school lacrosse team in hopes that it might give the students a sense of belonging and purpose, but fails to recruit any students. Miranda advises him to get Zach and Adam, the latter an absentee student who hunts with his elders. Russ visits Zach’s house, and realizes his parents are both alcoholics. He pays Zach twenty dollars to join lacrosse practice once and bring his fellow students. The practice is a success, and continues.

Russ adopts the black dog, naming her Maggie. Kyle observes lacrosse training and saves Maggie from a truck, later joining the team. Kyle sees his father arrested for domestic abuse, and tells Russ that his father is a Residential School survivor. Adam’s grandparents refuse to let him attend school due to their trauma and distrust relating to residential schools. Adam attends school and lacrosse practice behind their back.

Russ makes plans for the team to play in the lacrosse nationals in Toronto. Miranda organizes fundraising efforts through festivals and lacrosse tournaments. Adam’s grandparents see him playing, and he stops coming to school or practice, and so does Zach as the latter has to hunt for his family who is starving.

Russ goes to visit Adam and his grandparents who are hunting seals, inadvertently scaring off their prey. Russ asks Adam’s grandparents to let him return, and gifts Adam his lacrosse stick. The elders tell him the story of Sedna. Russ receives a letter of admission to teach at St. Andrews.

Miranda's sister berates her and burns her books for choosing lacrosse and school over her family. Kyle continues to be beaten by his father, and Adam eventually returns to school. The fundraising falls short of the goal after a sponsor pulls funding at the last minute, and Miranda decides to petition at the town council for funding. Russ is rebuked and the council decides not to fund the team. Adam’s grandmother arrives and speaks in support of them, changing the council’s mind.

Zach is arrested for stealing money from a cash register for his brother to fly to Toronto in his plan for them to escape his alcoholic parents. Russ visits him, and Zach tells him he will be sent to juvenile detention and will be unable to care for his younger brother, Johnny. He hangs himself in his cell that night. Miranda confronts Russ as he is packing to leave and shows him the team mourning together in the empty gymnasium. Russ joins the team for nationals in Toronto, but the team is outplayed by their opponents and fail to score a goal. Dejected, Russ tells the team that playing despite the loss of Zach is a victory. Kyle rejects this and motivates his teammates to successfully score a goal for Zach. Russ decides to stay in Kugluktuk.

== Cast ==
- Ben Schnetzer as Russ Sheppard
- Paul Nutarariaq as Zach Tuluguq
- Emerald MacDonald as Miranda Atatahak
- Booboo Stewart as Kyle Aviak
- Ricky Marty-Pahtaykan as Adam Kikpak
- Anna Lambe as Spring (Wynter Kuliktana Blais)
- Jamie Takkiruq as Vinny (David "Goalie' Topilak)
- Will Sasso as Mike Johnston
- Tantoo Cardinal as Principal Janace
- Fred Bailey as Roger Saata
- Madeline Ivalu as Lena
- Jennifer Kilabuk as Miranda's mother
- Laakkuluk Williamson as the co-op cashier
- Daniel Niego-Akavak as Jason Mitivik
- Natar Ungalaaq as Pete
- Eric Schweig as Harry Aviak
- Jack Anawak as a plane passenger

== Production ==
=== Development and writing ===
In 2004, Major League Lacrosse founder Jake Steinfeld watched a segment about the Kugluktuk Grizzlies on ESPN Sports Center and contacted the teacher, Russ Sheppard, who introduced lacrosse to the students attending Kugluktuk High School. After meeting the original Grizzlies students at a major lacrosse event in Denver, Steinfeld hired Frank Marshall as executive producer and Miranda de Pencier as director for the film. Producer Stacey Aglok MacDonald was a local resident of Kugluktuk and attended the high school just before the Grizzlies was formed. The script was written by Graham Yost and Moira Walley-Beckett. Almost all of the script and characters in the movie were based on real events.

=== Filming ===
The film auditioned over 600 Inuit and First Nation youths from Nunavut and Northwest Territories. Over 91% of the cast and over 33% of the film crew identified themselves as Inuit or First Nation. Principal photography were shot in Iqaluit, Nunavut (stand in for Kugluktuk), Niaqunnguut, Guelph, Ontario, and Toronto. Paid mentorship program was created to train Inuit actors, film crew, musicians and artists for the movie.

== Reception ==
On the review aggregator website Rotten Tomatoes, 87% of 30 critics' reviews are positive. The website's consensus reads: "The Grizzlies scores thanks to exceptional performances and an authentic approach to storytelling that transcends sports drama clichés." Metacritic, which uses a weighted average, assigned the film a score of 69 out of 100, based on four critics, indicating "generally favorable" reviews.

The film received an honourable mention for the Best Canadian Film award at the 2018 Vancouver International Film Festival.

== White saviour questions ==
The film has been the subject of analysis as to whether or not it fits into the concept of the white saviour narrative in film. According to producers Alethea Arnaquq-Baril and Stacey Aglok MacDonald, de Pencier was conscious of the potentially problematic racial aspect to the story, and worked with them to ensure that the screenplay centred the perspectives of Inuit youth and did not fall into white savior tropes; however, the film has still been analyzed by some film critics through a white savior lens.

== Murder of Emerald MacDonald ==
On May 3, 2021, the actress playing Miranda Atatahak, Emerald MacDonald, was found murdered outside a cabin in Kugluktuk, Nunavut. MacDonald, sister of producer Stacey Aglok MacDonald, was last seen in Kugluktuk on April 30, buying supplies to go to her family's cabin for the weekend. "Our hearts go out to Emerald’s family, friends, fans around the world, and to the whole community of Kugluktuk. It’s hard to imagine the hilarious, energetic, sensitive, sharp, inimitable, and incomparable Emerald is gone," posted director/producer Miranda de Pencier and producer Alethea Arnaquq-Baril on Twitter. MacDonald's death comes in the midst of the Missing and Murdered Indigenous Women (MMIW) crisis.

In May of 2024, a man was convicted of MacDonald's murder after a 3-day trial.
