= Anna Hudson =

Anna Hudson may refer to:

- Anna Hudson (author), writer of romance novels
- Anna Hudson (art historian), art historian, curator, writer and educator
