= Lin Alluna =

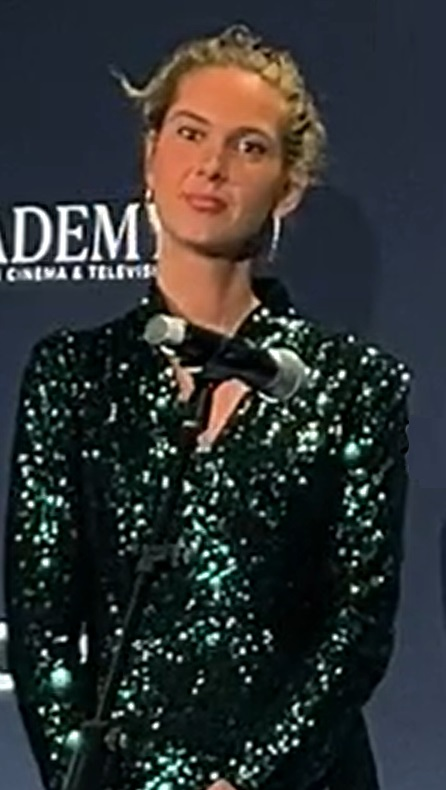
Lin Alluna at the 2024 Canadian Screen Awards.

Lin Alluna is a Danish film director. In 2017, she graduated as one of only six documentary film directors from the National Film School of Denmark, and was selected as one of the new “Nordic Talents” that same year by Nordisk Film & TV Fond.

She is most noted as director of her debut feature documentary film Twice Colonized from 2023, where she journeys alongside renowned Inuk lawyer and activist Aaju Peter, upon a complex and deeply personal journey. During development the film won five esteemed pitch awards. Most notably the film was presented at Cannes Docs Marché du Film at Cannes Film Festival in 2022, winning the top Docs-In-Progress Award. Since then, the movie has collected major awards and festival presence. The film made its world premiere at the 2023 Sundance Film Festival where it was a Grand Jury Prize World Cinema - Documentary nominee. After that, the documentary made its Danish premiere as the Opening Night Film at the 2023 CPH:DOX Film Festival. The film also opened the 2023 Hot Docs Canadian International Documentary Festival marking its Canadian premiere. It’s the first time in history that the same film has opened both these high profile documentary festivals. Recently the film was the winner of the Canadian Screen Award for Best Feature Length Documentary at the 12th Canadian Screen Awards in 2024. Veronica Esposito of The Guardian wrote about Alluna's work on Twice Colonized that "Alluna has done excellent work in finding scenes and images that implicate numerous sides of her subject, while drawing in the web of relationships and power structures that surround her. Over the course of the film’s 90 minutes, these chunks add up to far more than the sum of their parts." paving new ground as she "chose to buck the convention of most documentaries, making it a priority to give Peter broad agency over the telling of her story, and also involving her in decisions regarding the shooting and editing of the film."

Alluna wants to create films that doesn't shy away from the darkness in life, but still fills the audience with empowerment and hope for a better future. She makes films that are personal, political and poetic about inspiring women who fight to change the world. Talking about her method in 2020 Alluna said "Reality is complicated. To me, truth is a discussion, and as filmmakers I don’t think we should reduce the complexity of the world into one objective angle. I believe in being true to the reality protagonists experience and thereby giving my audience a chance to experience a fragment of it for themselves, too. In documentaries you really need to breathe with the people you work with, and trust that you will get to the right place together. It takes a lot of time, honesty, kindness, ambition and trust."

She previously directed the short films Whispering Revolution and Gardens of Dust.
