= North of North =

Canadian comedy television series

- Genre: Sitcom
- Created by: Stacey Aglok MacDonald; Alethea Arnaquq-Baril
- Starring: Anna Lambe; Maika Harper; Braeden Clarke; Zorga Qaunaq; Bailey Poching; Kelly William; Jay Ryan; Mary Lynn Rajskub; Nutaaq Simmonds; Keira Belle Cooper
- Composers: Caleb Chan; Brian Chan
- Country of origin: Canada
- No. of seasons: 2
- No. of episodes: 16

Production
- Production companies: Northwood Entertainment; Red Marrow Media

Original release
- Network: CBC Television; Aboriginal Peoples Television Network (APTN); Netflix
- Release: January 7, 2025 – present

North of North is a Canadian comedy television series that premiered on CBC Television (CBC), the Aboriginal Peoples Television Network (APTN), and Netflix in 2025, consisting of eight 24-minute episodes. It is Netflix's first Canadian original series.

Anna Lambe plays Siaja, a young Inuk woman in the small fictional Canadian Arctic community of Ice Cove, on Prince of Wales Island in Nunavut. North of North, while fictional, is heavily inspired by small Inuit communities in the Canadian Arctic.

On April 29, 2025, the show was renewed for a second season, which premiered in September 2026.

== Synopsis ==
The show follows Siaja Kudlak, a young Inuk mother living in the Arctic town of Ice Cove. The first season watches as she tries to reinvent herself after a spontaneous public exit from her marriage to the town's golden boy and her navigation through relationships, motherhood, and a new job. North of North addresses issues faced in Inuit communities through a comedic lens.

== Themes ==
The creators of North of North sought to challenge the audience's views on gender norms, spirituality, and sexuality. After leaving her husband, Siaja looks for a job challenging traditional gender roles. In episode 6, Neevee's encouragement for Siaja to embrace sexuality challenges norms of sexuality being repressed in the presence of family.

Also central to the storyline of North of North are traditional Inuit values, Inuit Qaujimajatuqangit, such as sharing, cooperation and respect for elders. The community centre where Siaja works shows how the community cooperates with each other, through services such as large item pickup, to maintain the effectiveness of Ice Cove. Sharing is emphasized when Siaja's daughter, Bun, shoots her first caribou, and the town gathers to allocate and share the meat. Respect and value for elders is emphasized in the community centre's and Siaja's efforts to make elder night more impactful.

== Cast and characters ==
=== Main ===
- Anna Lambe as Siaja Kudlak, a young Inuk mother who got married just out of high school, and wants to break out of the rut she has found herself in. She is a sweet and genuine but awkward person. Though determined, her ambition is often stymied by her awkward nature. Lambe is an Inuk from Iqaluit.
- Maika Harper as Neevee Kudlak, Siaja's mother who raised her on her own. She is a recovering alcoholic with a harsh personality and a biting sense of humour who isn't afraid to tell it like it is. She runs a local general store. Harper is an Inuk from Iqaluit.
- Braeden Clarke as Kuuk Nanuaq, a Cree/Inuk man who grew up in a southern city with family ties to Ice Cove. He works as a researcher and assistant to Alistair. He is Siaja's love interest, which is complicated by his on-again-off-again relationship with his girlfriend Alexis. Clarke is from the Mikisew Cree First Nation in Alberta.
- Zorga Qaunaq as Millie Maktaana, Siaja's free-spirited Inuk friend and co-worker at the community centre. Qaunaq is an Inuk from Igloolik.
- Bailey Poching as Colin, a queer Māori man and Siaja's friend who runs the local radio station. Poching is Ngāti Whātua o Kaipara (Māori) and Samoan.
- Kelly William as Ting Miaq (season 1), Siaja's self-centered husband and the local "golden boy". William is a Secwépemc of the Xatśūll First Nation.
- Jay Ryan as Alistair Brennan, Siaja's estranged father who only recently learned of her existence. He is a researcher for a company that wants to build a research facility in Ice Cove. He appears to still harbour feelings for Neevee. Ryan is from Auckland, New Zealand.
- Mary Lynn Rajskub as Helen May-Qaqsuk, the non-Inuk town manager and Siaja's boss. She loves living in Ice Cove and wants to do right by the community, but at the same time, she enjoys having a position of authority and is often hindered by her ignorance and self-righteousness.
- Nutaaq Doreen Simmonds as Elisapee, an elder and devout Christian with clearly defined moral standards, who works as the community centre's receptionist. Simmonds is an Iñupiaq from Utqiagvik, Alaska.
- Keira Belle Cooper as Bun, Ting and Siaja's daughter. Cooper is an Inuk from Iqaluit.

=== Recurring ===
- Vinnie Karetak as Jeffrey Umik, the operator of the local dump, who also does multiple other jobs for the town. Karetak is an Inuk from Arviat.
- Taylor Hickson as Alexis, Kuuk's sometime girlfriend. Hickson is from Kelowna, British Columbia.
- Malaya Qaunirq Chapman as Auntie Eva, Neevee's friend and employee at her store. Qaunirq Chapman is an Inuk from Iqaluit who grew up in Pangnirtung.

=== Guest ===
- Tanya Tagaq as Nuliajuk, the mythical Inuk sea goddess who appears to Siaja in a vision. Tagaq is an Inuk from Cambridge Bay.
- Dan Jeannotte as Olivier, a Québécois dog musher who Siaja has a short-lived fling with.
- Laakkuluk Williamson Bathory as Auntie Vicky, a local woman who performs a mask dance. Williamson Bathory was born in Saskatoon, but is a Kalaaleq, Greenlandic Inuk.
- Elisapie appears as herself, a singer-songwriter, in the season 2 finale.

== Production ==
The series was created by Stacey Aglok MacDonald and Alethea Arnaquq-Baril. Directors include Anya Adams, Danis Goulet, Zoe Leigh Hopkins, Lisa Jackson, Renuka Jeyapalan and Aleysa Young.

Filming began in Iqaluit, Nunavut on March 14, 2024 and ended in June 2024. The Iqaluit Curling Club was turned into a sound stage featuring the interior sets for filming, as there is no nearby filming studio. MacDonald and Arnaquq-Baril's Red Marrow Media is working to create a permanent studio but it was not ready in time for the show's first season.

Debra Hanson and Nooks Lindell worked as the costume designers on the show. They focused on local Inuit artisans and designers to source the Inuit clothing, shoes, and jewellery worn by the characters. "It was really important to us that our parkas and anything traditional were made here in Nunavut, by Inuit artists," says MacDonald. "They had to go to the ends of the Arctic to fashion the magnificent costumes that people will see on screen, which are unlike anything that's ever been seen before."

Arnaquq-Baril said she was overwhelmed by the support from Nunavummiut. "We get messages from people across the community just excited to be a part of it because a huge part of the community is in our show, on screen, and also working behind the scenes too." Iqaluit is also the hometown of Anna Lambe, who stars as Siaja. She said, "People constantly came up to hug me and say how proud they were of me and how exciting this was for Nunavut, for Inuit and Indigenous film and television. I wouldn't have wanted to film it anywhere else because the outpouring of love and support we received was so empowering."

The series premiered in Canada on APTN and CBC on January 7, 2025, and premiered globally on Netflix on April 10, 2025. North of North was renewed for a second season in April 2025. Season 2 was filmed in Iqaluit and Toronto.

== Cultural representation ==
North of North displays many cultural elements central to Inuit culture.

In the first episode, Siaja encounters Nuliajuk, an Inuit sea goddess who controls the sea mammals. Nuliajuq is one of the most celebrated deities and is also one of the most feared in Inuit religion. Her role is central to Inuit identity, and she serves as a guide for Siaja throughout the series, emphasizing North of North's commitment to cultural narratives.

Most Inuit women wear kakiniit, traditional tattoos which are usually found only on women, that may represent rites of passage, group of Inuit to which the women belongs, or representations of spirituality. Banned by Christian missionaries during the 20th century upon colonization, tunniit became practised again in the early 2000s, and many Inuit women wear them today. A generational gap is shown: Elisapee, an elder who experienced a residential school as a child, does not have tattoos. Middle aged women Neevee and Auntie Vicky have both hand and facial tattoos. Young women Siaja and Millie have only hand tattoos.

The choice of costumes in North of North reflects modern Inuit clothing choices. Elements seen in the show include waterproof sealskin boots and parkas made from a blend of synthetic and natural materials, honouring cultural historic significance with modern functionality. Additionally, patterns on the parkas of Siaja and other characters traditionally communicate information about the wearer's age, kinship, and marital status.

Bannock, a staple of Inuit culture, is mentioned and depicted in several instances in North of North. Before contact, bannock was made from plants indigenous to Inuit traditional territory. After contact, bannock began to be made from flour, and this is the version most known today. While once a staple for survival on reserves under the Indian Act, bannock has evolved into a cultural symbol for community and empowerment.

== Episodes ==
=== Series overview ===
Season	Episodes	Originally released	
Season	Episodes	First released	Last released
1	8	January 7, 2025	February 18, 2025
2	8	September 8, 2026	September 29, 2026

=== Season 1 (2025) ===
No. overall	No. in season	Title	Directed by	Written by	Original release date	Prod. code
1	1	"Top of the World"	Anya Adams	Stacey Aglok MacDonald & Alethea Arnaquq-Baril	January 7, 2025	478520-1
Siaja, a young Inuk woman living in Ice Cove, is stuck in an unfulfilling marriage with her high school sweetheart, Ting, who is happy for her to be a stay-at-home mom. During a seal hunt, she falls overboard and hallucinates that she sees the goddess Nuliajuq. When Ting berates her for embarrassing him, Siaja abruptly decides to change her life, going to a party and kissing a stranger. At the local festival, she publicly breaks up with Ting after they are named king and queen of the seal hunt. Siaja learns that the stranger she kissed is the father she never knew, Alistair.
2	2	"No Freeloading"	Anya Adams	Story by : Kathryn Borel, Jr. Teleplay by : Susan Coyne	January 7, 2025	478520-8
Siaja and her daughter, Bun, crash at her mother Neevee's home. After her mother warns her that she can't be a freeloader, Siaja gets a temporary job doing large item pickup for the town. After Siaja proves herself to be a great communicator, Helen, the facilitator of the community centre, offers her a job as her assistant. Neevee tries to facilitate a reconciliation between Siaja and Ting, but Siaja declares their marriage over. Neevee offers Siaja a more permanent place in her home.
3	3	"Dumpcano"	Aleysa Young	Garry Campbell	January 14, 2025	478520-2
Siaja takes some personal belongings that remind her of her husband to the dump and lights them on fire. She unknowingly starts an uncontrolled fire at the dump. Siaja starts her new job and is surprised when her first meeting involves talking to Alistair, her estranged father, about his proposal to set up a research station in Ice Cove. The fire at the dump creates a public relations crisis as Helen and her team want to impress Alistair and Kuuk. After Bun gets in trouble at school, Neevee takes her out for the day to find out what is wrong.
4	4	"Joy to the Effing World"	Aleysa Young	Alethea Arnaquq-Baril & Linsey Stewart	January 21, 2025	478520-7
Siaja is tasked with running elders' night, a usually dull affair. She and Kuuk decide to enliven it by inviting the town's youth. However, one of the elders passes away during the party. Surprisingly, his best friend Lazarus thanks Siaja for providing fun in his last days. Meanwhile, Neevee tells Alistair she wants nothing to do with him, but in a small town like Ice Cove, they find each other unavoidable.
5	5	"Walrus Dick Baseball"	Renuka Jeyapalan	Moriah Sallaffie & Garry Campbell	January 28, 2025	478520-3
Siaja gets the idea to raise funds for Ice Cove by challenging their rival town Tuktuktalik to a friendly game of Inuk baseball. However, Helen agrees to a winner-take-all format instead of splitting the funds, raising the stakes. Meanwhile, Ting becomes envious of Siaja and Kuuk's closeness, and initially refuses to play until Siaja convinces him. The Ice Cove team ultimately prevails at the game.
6	6	"Carnivores"	Zoe Leigh Hopkins	Linsey Stewart	February 4, 2025	478520-4
After a series of erotic dreams, Siaja's friends encourage her to have a one-night stand. A disastrous date with fetishist Olivier helps her realize she is in love with Kuuk. She kisses Kuuk but learns his on-off girlfriend Alexis has flown in to surprise him. Meanwhile, Alistair and Neevee attempt to give their relationship a try, but when Alistair brings up the past, Neevee calls their relationship off.
7	7	"Lost and Found"	Danis Goulet	Susan Coyne	February 11, 2025	478520-5
When Ting goes missing during a hunt, Siaja's knowledge of his hunting habits helps to find him alive, but injured. To help with his recovery, Siaja temporarily returns to Ting's home, but finds herself falling into old patterns with their relationship. Neevee starts seeing another man, disappointing Alistair.
8	8	"Bad Influences"	Danis Goulet	Story by : Aviaq Johnston & JP Larocque; Teleplay by : Aviaq Johnston & Garry Campbell	February 18, 2025	478520-6
Just before Siaja is due to pitch Ice Cove as a research station to investors, a distraught Neevee reveals that Siaja had an older sister who was stolen as a baby by her white father, explaining why she hid Siaja from Alistair. Siaja impresses the research team with her speech, but ultimately Tuktuktalik is chosen for the research station due to its better infrastructure. Nevertheless, Ice Cove is chosen for a satellite office, which Alistair will run. At the community celebration, Alistair tells Neevee he is staying for his daughter and granddaughter, not for her. Kuuk and Alexis also tell Siaja they are staying in the town.

=== Season 2 (2026) ===
No. overall	No. in season	Title	Directed by	Written by	Original release date	Prod. code
9	1	"I Wanna Mask Dance With Somebody"	Zoe Leigh Hopkins	Stacey Aglok MacDonald & Mike Goldbach	September 8, 2026	478520-9
A few months later, Siaja feels adrift. She tries to boost tourism by hosting a traditional mask dance for a visiting cruise ship. However, the slipshod electronics cause the performance to go awry. Despite Siaja's suspicions of Alexis' cliche influencer coverage of the town, Alexis edits the footage in a flattering way. Meanwhile, Alistair fires Kuuk due to a lack of funding, and Neevee meets Kati, a romance novelist who criticizes the lack of women-oriented products in Neevee's store. Neevee refuses to take a DNA test to find Siaja's sister; after the performance, Siaja swabs Neevee herself.
10	2	"Ice, Ice, Baby"	Zoe Leigh Hopkins	Moriah Sallaffie & Shebli Zarghami	September 8, 2026	TBA
Hoping to deliver an inspiration headline to Helen in the midst of a water crisis, Siaja recruits Alistair to help deliver fresh ice to local elders. However, the ice is contaminated with E. coli and causes an outbreak. Siaja learns more about Alistair's family in the process but without Siaja's help, Neevee struggles to expand her store. Alexis finds out about Kuuk's unemployment. Alistair has dinner with Kati. Siaja pitches a winter ball to Helen.
11	3	"Code Blue"	Jason Priestley	Story by : Stacey Aglok MacDonald & Mike Goldbach; Teleplay by : Stacey Aglok MacDonald	September 15, 2026	TBA
Upon learning Michael Kowalski, an old flame of Helen's and a member of the public housing board, is leading the next first-aid training, Siaja and Millie both aim to get close to him to obtain public housing. During an outdoor exercise, their rivalry causes Michael to fall into freezing water, necessitating a visit to a sauna where Kuuk and Alistair are discussing their lives and romantic tribulations. Millie and Siaja ultimately decline Michael's help in their housing search and decide to live together After realizing the town women won't visit her expanded store until Elisapee gives it a Christian blessing, Neevee grudgingly allows it.
12	4	"Fast and Flirtatious"	Lisa Jackson	Alethea Arnaquq-Baril & Garry Campbell	September 15, 2026	TBA
Since Ting has remarried, Colin and Millie organize a speed dating event to help Siaja's love life. Siaja convinces Helen to let her lead the winter ball project.Meanwhile, Alistair spends time with Bun, but apparently loses her during a game of hide and seek in the tundra. In despair, he calls Neevee, but is angered to learn she did not tell him Bun had made it to her home. Siaja is hesitant to commit to anyone from speed dating but hits it off with Ethan, Kuuk's coworker at the school. She decides to have a fling with another man from the event.
13	5	"Beer Quest"	Yael Staav	Aviaq Johnston & Rachel Langer	September 22, 2026	TBA
Having forgotten to plan Millie's birthday, Siaja enlists Colin to throw together a last-minute party. Since Kuuk and Alexis have recently moved into teacher's housing, Alexis agrees to host. Colin and Siaja unsuccessfully scour the town for beer but are unsuccessful. Along with Millie, resort to visiting "Two-Eyed Annie", a local bootlegger, but get into a physical fight with her after she insults Neevee. In jail, Millie admits that she had known Siaja had forgotten to plan the party all along, but went with it because she is fond of Siaja's sincerity and impulsiveness. Helen bails them out and they attend the successful party. Privately, Kuuk admits to Alexis that he wants to stay in Ice Cove.
14	6	"Missing Pieces"	Yael Staav	Jessie Gabe	September 22, 2026	TBA
Colin discovers that Siaja's half-sister Olivia Jensen has an upcoming art exhibit in Toronto. Siaja impulsively flies there to meet her, and runs into her at a bar. Siaja lies about her identity and hits it off with Olivia, though realizes Olivia is wealthy and not particularly invested in learning about their mother. At the exhibit, Siaja calls out a sculpture emphasizing Neevee's previous alcoholism and reveals her identity. An angered Olivia tells her to leave. Neevee encourages Alistair's romance with Kati, and learns the truth about Siaja's trip.
15	7	"Ghosted"	Zoe Leigh Hopkins	Kayla Lorette, Garry Campbell & Stacey Aglok MacDonald	September 29, 2026	TBA
16	8	"Experrrrt"	Zoe Leigh Hopkins	Alethea Arnaquq-Baril & Tassie Cameron	September 29, 2026	TBA

== Reception and accolades ==
=== Critical response ===
The Hollywood Reporter called the show a "warm and likable journey into Canada's icy north", while noting the series also touches upon more serious subjects, including the lingering trauma of residential schools and child-family separations.

The New York Times included North of North on a list of the 30 Best TV Shows on Netflix Right Now in August 2025.

=== Awards and nominations ===
In 2025, the Directors Guild of Canada awarded North of North the Best Sound Editing, Best Picture Editing, and Best Production Design in the Comedy or Family Series category for episode "Top of the World". The episode "Bad Influences" also won the Outstanding Directorial Achievement in Comedy Series. North of North was also the 2025 winner for Comedy Series Crew of the Year.

North of North was a nominee for the Best New Scripted Series by the Film Independent Spirit Awards in 2026, and Anna Lambe received a nomination for the Best Lead Performance in a New Scripted Series.

At the 14th Canadian Screen Awards, the series was nominated for 20 awards, receiving several, including Best Comedy Series, Best Leading Performance in a Comedy Series (Lambe), Best Supporting Performance in a Comedy Series (Harper), Best Guest Performance in a Comedy Series (Tagaq) and Best Ensemble Performance in a Comedy Series (Lambe, Harper, Clarke, Qaunaq, Ryan).

The Television Critics Association Awards nominated North of North for Outstanding New Program in 2025.

Several North of North episodes received nominations from the Writers Guild of Canada in 2026, and the series won the comedy series screenwriting award for episode "Dumpcano".
