= Heather Igloliorte =

Inuk art historian

Heather L. Igloliorte
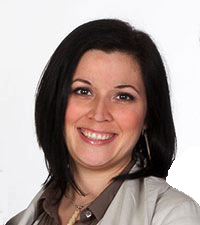
- Born: 1979 (age 46–47); Happy Valley-Goose Bay, Newfoundland and Labrador, Canada
- Citizenship: Inuk and Canadian
- Education: BFA, NSCAD University; MA, Canadian Art History, Carleton University; Ph.D., Cultural Mediations, Carleton University

Heather L. Igloliorte (born 1979) is an Inuk scholar, independent curator and art historian from Nunatsiavut.

She was appointed inaugural Canada Excellence Research Chair in Decolonial and Transformational Indigenous Art Practices at the University of Victoria in 2023.

Between 2019 and 2023, she was an associate professor of Indigenous art history at Concordia University in Montreal, Quebec, where she held the University Research Chair in Indigenous Circumpolar Arts. Prior she was the Indigenous Art History and Community Engagement Research Chair at that university from 2016 to 2019. She was a Scholar in Residence at the University of Winnipeg in summer 2020.

Igloliorte was co-director of the Initiative for Indigenous Futures (IIF) Cluster at the Milieux Institute for Arts, Culture and Technology at Concordia University and was a special advisor to the university's provost on advancing Indigenous knowledges.

She currently holds Board positions with the Native North American Art Studies Association, the Inuit Art Foundation, and was a board member of the Nunavut Film Development Corporation. Igloliorte has advised the Social Sciences and Humanities Research Council of Canada, the Federation for the Humanities and Social Sciences, the National Film Board of Canada and the Otsego Institute for Native American Art History at the Fenimore Art Museum in Cooperstown, New York.

== Early life and education ==
Igloliorte was born in Happy Valley-Goose Bay in 1979. James Igloliorte, her father, served as a Judge with the Provincial Court of Newfoundland and Labrador, making him Labrador's first Inuk judge and one of the few practicing Indigenous magistrates in all of Canada.

Igloliorte obtained a Bachelor of Fine Arts from NSCAD University in 2003. She completed a Master of Arts in Canadian Art History at Carleton University in 2007 and obtained a Ph.D. in Cultural Mediations at Carleton University's Institute for Comparative Studies in Literature, Art and Culture (ICSLAC) in 2013.

Before becoming a scholar and an independent curator, Igloliorte was a practicing visual artist. Her work is held in various private and public collections, including the Senate of Canada. She is the first Inuk art historian in Canada to hold a doctoral degree.

== Research activities and curatorial projects ==
Igloliorte's varied teaching and research interests primarily focus on historic and contemporary Inuit art in Canada and circumpolar art studies. A major objective of her academic praxis includes radically increasing Inuit participation in arts research and arts-based professional practice. She is achieving this through leadership of an academic grant that aims to empower circumpolar Indigenous peoples to become leaders in the arts through training and mentorship.

Her other interests include First Nations and Métis art in Canada; Native North American and global Indigenous arts; and Indigenous film, performance and new media practices.

She also researches Indigenous exhibition and collecting histories, curatorial theory and practice, along with the examination of decolonizing methodologies that include inquiries into colonization, survivance, sovereignty, resistance and resurgence.

Igloliorte's earlier curatorial projects included: the online collaborative exhibition "Inuit Art Alive" (2008), sponsored by the Inuit Art Foundation; "Decolonize Me" (2011), which debuted at the Ottawa Art Gallery and toured throughout Canada; and the nationally touring "We Were So Far Away: The Inuit Experience of Residential Schools" (2012), a Legacy of Hope Foundation project based on the oral histories of eight Inuit former students of the residential school system.

Her more recent curatorial projects include the "Land and Lifeways: Inuit Rights in the North" (2014) exhibit at the Canadian Museum for Human Rights; the first, nationally touring exhibition of Labrador Inuit art entitled "SakKijâjuk: Art and Craft from Nunatsiavut" (2016) which debuted at The Rooms; and "Ilippunga: The Brousseau Inuit Art Collection" (2016), a permanent exhibition at the Musée National des Beaux-Arts du Québec. She also co-curated "iNuit blanche" (2016), the world's first all-circumpolar, one-night-only international arts festival held in St. John's, Newfoundland. SakKijâjuk: Art and Craft from Nunatsiavut, which will tour until 2020, received an Outstanding Achievement Award from the Canadian Museums Association in 2017.

Her most current curatorial projects include "Among All These Tundras" (2018), a contemporary circumpolar art exhibition at Galerie Leonard & Bina Ellen at Concordia University and "Alootook Ipellie: Walking Both Sides of an Invisible Border" (2018), a retrospective exhibit held at the Carleton University Art Gallery. In 2018, Igloliorte was also appointed curatorial lead for the inaugural exhibition at the Inuit Art Centre at the Winnipeg Art Gallery. INUA (2021) was the first exhibition of contemporary Inuit art at the Winnipeg Art Gallery's new dedicated space to Inuit art, which is named Qaumajuq.

In 2019, she co-founded the GLAM Collective (short for Galleries, Libraries, Archives and Museums), which explores new methods to exhibit Indigenous art to the Canadian public.

== Publications ==
Igloliorte has co-edited several books concerning Indigenous art and circumpolar cultural heritage. She has also edited catalogues for her respective Decolonize Me (2011), SakKijâjuk: Art and Craft from Nunatsiavut (2017) and Ilippunga: The Brousseau Inuit Art Collection (2016) exhibitions.

In 2018, her article Curating Inuit Qaujimajatuqangit: Inuit Knowledge in the Qallunaat Art Museum (2017) was recognized with an Art Journal Award by the College Art Association.

Her other publications include chapters and catalogue essays in Negotiations in a Vacant Lot: Studying the Visual in Canada (2014); Manifestations: New Native Art Criticism (2012); Changing Hands: Art Without Reservation 3 (2012); Curating Difficult Knowledge (2011); Native American Art at Dartmouth: Highlights from the Hood Museum of Art (2011); Inuit Modern (2010); and Response, Responsibility, and Renewal: Canada's Truth and Reconciliation Journey (2009).

She also co-edited a special edition of an arts journal focused on Indigenous new media, and co-authored an article outlining the cartography of Indigenous perspectives and knowledge in the Great Lakes Region.

In 2022, she co-edited and wrote for the book Qummut Qukiria! ("Up like a bullet!" in Inuktitut) with Anna Hudson and Jan-Erik Lundström, a book which celebrates art and culture within and beyond traditional Inuit and Sámi homelands in the Circumpolar Arctic. The 38 essays in this book helped to illuminate their subject.

== Awards ==
- 2021 Award for Curatorial Excellence in Contemporary Art, Hnatyshyn Foundation
- 2021 RCA Medal, Royal Canadian Academy of Arts
- 2023 Winner, Melva J. Dwyer Award for Qummut Qukiria!
- 2023 Honourable Mention, Canadian Museums Association Award for Outstanding Achievement (Research) for Qummut Qukiria!
