= Nutaaq Simmonds =

American Iñupiat actress

Nutaaq Doreen Simmonds is an American Iñupiaq actress, activist, and language teacher from Utqiagvik, Alaska. She is known for her roles in the 2024 American drama True Detective: Night Country and 2025 Canadian comedy series North of North.

== Early life ==
Simmonds was born as the third daughter to Samuel Simmonds and Martha Ahnupkana Simmonds. Her mother died when she was 5 years old, and her father remarried. She has 13 siblings and 4 children, one which she adopted.

== Career ==
Simmonds acted as the aunt to Jodie Foster's stepdaughter in True Detective: Night Country (2024).

Her voice was used in The Revenant, although she received no screen credit, notification, or financial compensation. In a scene from the film, a Pawnee acted by Arthur Redcloud is building a shelter. However, the poetry being recited was not in the Plains Indian Pawnee dialect, but the Iñupiaq language. Simmonds' son first pointed out this fact while the two were watching the film. She had recited the poem roughly 30 years earlier.

She debuted in theater in 2024 and was cast as Elisapee in the Canadian comedy series, North of North.

== Personal life ==
Simmonds serves on the advisory board of Sovereign Iñupiat For A Living Arctic, a cultural organization for Iñupiat peoples. She is also an advisory board member of Native Movement, an Alaska-based social justice advocacy group. She has been active with Resisting Environmental Destruction on Indigenous Land (REDOIL).
