= Bailey Poching =

Māori and Samoan comedian

- Born: 31 August 1998 (age 28)
- Occupation: Actor
- Years active: 2018–present

Bailey Poching is a New Zealand-based Māori and Samoan comedian, filmmaker and actor. After making his TV debut on The Comedy Mixtape, he has gone on to appear on multiple episodes of New Zealand's longest running panel show 7 Days. He is known for his comedic role as Colin, a communications officer and radio DJ for a tight-knit Arctic community in the Canadian TV show North of North.

== Early life ==
Although born in Oceania, he spent his first 19 years of life in the UK. He was raised in Wakefield, England, and now resides in Tāmaki Makaurau Auckland, Aotearoa New Zealand.

== Career ==
He began his acting career in short films and ads of major companies such as Coca Cola. As a Polynesian actor, Poching has faced challenges in the industry, particularly in terms of the limited opportunities available to indigenous actors. "Scarcity" is the term he uses to describe the struggle to break into the industry.

His breakthrough role was the side character of Colin on the CBC show North of North, where he got to represent his Māori side, becoming easily one of the most beloved characters.
