= Paul Nutarariaq =

Canadian actor (born 1992/3)

- Born: 1992 or 1993 (age 33–34); Igloolik, Nunavut, Canada
- Occupation: Actor
- Years active: 2011–present
- Known for: The Grizzlies

Paul Ike Nutarariaq is a Canadian actor most noted for his performance in the 2018 film The Grizzlies, for which he received a Canadian Screen Award nomination for Best Actor at the 7th Canadian Screen Awards in 2019.

He is originally from Igloolik, Nunavut but was primarily raised in Iqaluit.

He previously appeared in the films Throat Song and Iqaluit, and in the CBC comedy series Little Dog.
