= List of Magical Negro occurrences in fiction =

The Magical Negro is a supporting stock character in fiction who, by means of special insight or powers often of a supernatural or quasi-mystical nature, helps the white protagonist get out of trouble. African-American filmmaker Spike Lee coined the term, deriding the archetype of the "super-duper magical negro" in 2001 while discussing films with students at Washington State University and at Yale University.

The Magical Negro is a subset of the more generic numinous Negro, a term coined by Richard Brookhiser in the National Review. The latter term refers to saintly, respected, or heroic black protagonists or mentors.

The following list presents examples of the archetype that have been proposed or discussed.

== Film and television ==
=== 1980s and earlier ===
- Uncle Remus (James Baskett) in Song of the South (1946)
- Homer Smith (Sidney Poitier) in Lilies of the Field (1963)
- Super Soul (Cleavon Little) in Vanishing Point (1971)
- Grover Muldoon (Richard Pryor) in Silver Streak (1976)
- Big Jim Slade (Manny Perry) in The Kentucky Fried Movie (1977)
- Snoe (Clarence Muse) in The Black Stallion (1979)
- Dick Hallorann (Scatman Crothers) in The Shining (1980)
- Mr. Bloom (Scatman Crothers) in Twilight Zone: The Movie (1983)
- Guinan (Whoopi Goldberg) in Star Trek: The Next Generation (1987–1994)

=== 1990s ===
- Oda Mae Brown (Whoopi Goldberg) in Ghost (1990)
- Azeem (Morgan Freeman) in Robin Hood: Prince of Thieves (1991)
- Vinnie (Laurence Fishburne) in Searching for Bobby Fischer (1993)
- Benjamin Buford "Bubba" Blue (Mykelti Williamson) in Forrest Gump (1994)
- Moses (Bill Cobbs) in The Hudsucker Proxy (1994)
- Ellis Boyd "Red" Redding (Morgan Freeman) in The Shawshank Redemption (1994)
- Ram Dass (Errol Sitahal) in A Little Princess (1995)
- Chubbs (Carl Weathers) in Happy Gilmore (1996)
- Kazaam (Shaquille O'Neal) in Kazaam (1996)
- Arthur Chaney (Bill Cobbs) in Air Bud (1997)
- Minerva (Irma P. Hall) in Midnight in the Garden of Good and Evil (1997)
- Lamont (Guy Torry) in American History X (1998)
- Rastaman (Amiri Baraka) in Bulworth (1998)
- G (Eddie Murphy) in Holy Man (1998)
- Albert Lewis ("Doc") (Cuba Gooding Jr.) in What Dreams May Come (1998)
- Rufus (Chris Rock) in Dogma (1999)
- John Coffey (Michael Clarke Duncan) in The Green Mile (1999)
- Morpheus (Laurence Fishburne) and the Oracle (Gloria Foster / Mary Alice) in The Matrix (1999) and its sequels

=== 2000s ===
- Elliot's cellmate/God (Gabriel Casseus) in Bedazzled (2000)
- William Bludworth (Tony Todd) in Final Destination (2000) and its sequels Final Destination 2 (2003), Final Destination 5 (2011) and Final Destination Bloodlines (2025)
- Cash (Don Cheadle) in The Family Man (2000)
- Bagger Vance (Will Smith) in The Legend of Bagger Vance (2000)
- Tommy Johnson (Chris Thomas King) in O Brother, Where Art Thou?, the accompanying guitarist who claims he sold his soul to the devil in exchange for his musical skill
- The Blind Seer (Lee Weaver) in O Brother Where Art Thou? (2000)
- Juba (Djimon Hounsou) in Gladiator (2000)
- Reggie Kane (Andre Braugher) in Duets (2000)
- Jezelle Gay Hartman (Patricia Belcher), a clairvoyant who sacrifices herself to warn and protect two white siblings in Jeepers Creepers (2001)
- Abou Fatma (Djimon Hounsou) in The Four Feathers (2002)
- Mateo (Djimon Hounsou) in In America (2002)
- God (Morgan Freeman) in the films Bruce Almighty (2003) and Evan Almighty (2007)
- Lucius Fox (Morgan Freeman) in Batman Begins (2005) and its sequels The Dark Knight (2008) The Dark Knight Rises (2012).
- Charles (Afemo Omilami) in Hounddog (2007)
- August (Queen Latifah), May (Sophie Okonedo) and June (Alicia Keys) in The Secret Life of Bees (2008)
- Louise (Jennifer Hudson) in Sex and the City (2008), where Carrie Bradshaw's emotional recuperation depends entirely on the labor of her plucky black personal assistant, who is disengaged from the storyline as soon as Carrie starts to feel better.

=== 2010s ===
- Harry "Red" Newman (Danny Glover) in Legendary (2010)
- Brother Sam (Mos Def/Yasiin Bey) in five episodes of the sixth season of Dexter (2011)
- Cinna, Rue and Thresh in Hunger Games (2012)
- The janitor (Jordan Peele) and the copier repair man (Keegan-Michael Key) in the "Magic Negro Fight" sketch on Key & Peele (2012)
- Henry "Holy Wayne" Gilchrest Jr. (Paterson Joseph) and Virgil (Steven Williams) in The Leftovers (2014)
- Evelyn (Alfre Woodard) in Annabelle (2014)
- Rich Purnell (Donald Glover) in The Martian (2015)
- Chief Gus Mancuso (Laurence Fishburne) in Passengers (2016)
- Keith (John Legend) in La La Land (2016)
- Mr. Church (Eddie Murphy) in Mr. Church (2016)
- Denver Moore (Djimon Hounsou) in Same Kind of Different as Me (2017)
- Ron Strickland (Ice Cube) in Fist Fight (2017)
- Don Shirley (Mahershala Ali) in Green Book (2018)
- Elizabeth Howard (Crystal R. Fox) in Big Little Lies (2019)
- Madame Xanadu (Jeryl Prescott) in Swamp Thing (2019)
- Jasper John (Wayne Dehard) in The Peanut Butter Falcon (2019)
- Genie (Will Smith) in Aladdin (2019)

=== 2020s ===
- Peter (Yashua Mack) in Wendy (2020)
- Ebo Odom (Leslie Odom Jr.) in Music (2021)
- Fab G (Billy Porter) in Cinderella (2021)
- The American Society of Magical Negroes (2024)

== Literature ==
- Jim in Mark Twain's 1884 book the Adventures of Huckleberry Finn and its adaptations.
- The Schwarzkommando in Gravity’s Rainbow (1973) by Thomas Pynchon is an African military unit first considered fictional but later found to be real, and described as “their magic Negro, their prototype” at the end of the 13th section of Part One, Beyond the Zero.
- A recurring archetype in Stephen King's novels as well as some adaptations of his work:
  - Dick Hallorann in The Shining (1977) novel, the 1980 film adaptation (Scatman Crothers), and the 1997 TV miniseries (Melvin Van Peebles)
  - Mother Abagail in The Stand (1978) novel and the 1994 TV adaptation (Ruby Dee)
  - Lester "Speedy" Parker in The Talisman (1984).
  - John Coffey in The Green Mile (1996) novel and its 1999 film adaptation (played by Michael Clarke Duncan)

== Video games ==
- Far Cry 3: according to writer John Walker, the plot follows an inverted 'Magic Negro' trope.

== See also ==
- Noble savage
- Stereotypes of African Americans
- Tokenism
- Xenocentrism
