= Miranda de Pencier =

Canadian film and TV director (born 1968)

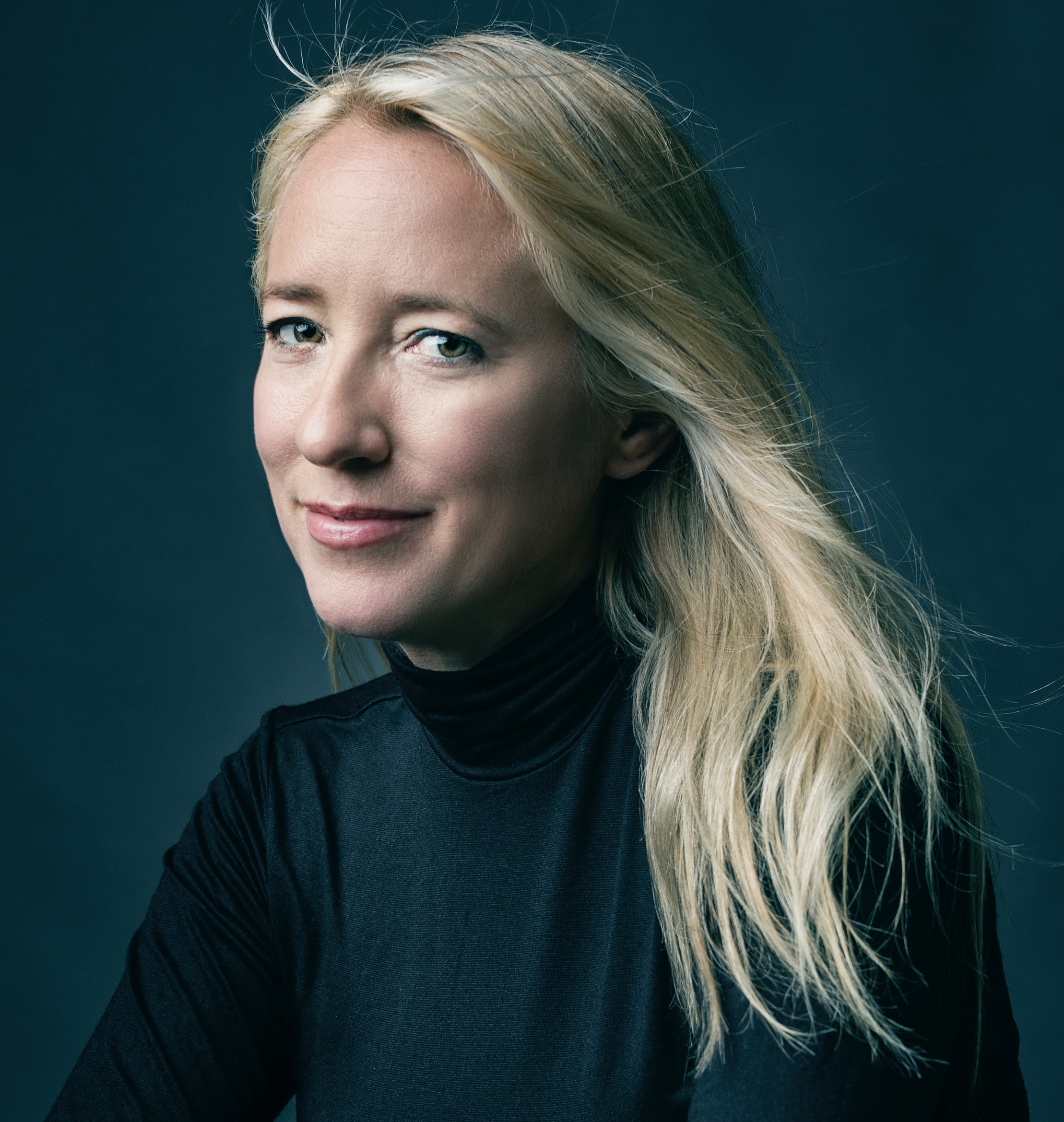
- De Pencier in 2020
- Born: August 20, 1968 (age 57); Toronto, Ontario, Canada
- Occupations: Actress, director, producer

Miranda de Pencier (born August 20, 1968, in Toronto, Ontario) is a Canadian film and television director, producer, and actress. She is most noted for her 2011 film Throat Song, which won the Canadian Screen Award for Best Live Action Short Drama at the 1st Canadian Screen Awards.

== Career ==
She began her career as an actress, most notably playing Josie Pye in the 1985 telemovie Anne of Green Gables and its sequels. She also had a recurring role on Street Legal in the 1989–90 season as Jennifer Winston, a college student who was dating Chuck Tchobanian, and appeared in the film The Myth of the Male Orgasm and on stage in Canadian productions of Les Misérables and Aspects of Love.

In the late 1990s she began producing, first in theatre before moving into film production. Through her production company, Northwood Entertainment, she first produced the 2005 film Cake. Her subsequent credits as a producer have included the films Pu-239, Adam and Beginners, the television series Wild Roses and the new 2017 Anne of Green Gables adaptation Anne with an E.

The short film Throat Song was her debut as a director. Her feature debut, The Grizzlies, debuted at the 2018 Toronto International Film Festival in September 2018. In October, de Pencier won the Directors Guild of Canada award for Best Direction in a Feature Film for The Grizzlies.

== Personal life ==
She is the daughter of magazine publisher Michael de Pencier, and the sister of documentary filmmaker Nicholas de Pencier.

== Filmography ==
=== Acting ===
==== Film ====
Year	Title	Role	Notes
1987	Mind Benders	Julie Freeman	
1988	Murder One	Jenny	
1989	Sea of Love	Bride	
1993	The Myth of the Male Orgasm	Jane Doe	
1995	Butterbox Babies	May Wilson	

==== Television ====
Year	Title	Role	Notes
1985	Anne of Green Gables	Josie Pye	2 episodes
1987	Anne of Green Gables: The Sequel	Josie Pye	Television film
1989–1990	Street Legal	Jennifer Winston	7 episodes
1990	My Secret Identity	Michelle	Episode: "White Lies"
1990	Star Runner	Linda	Television film
1994–1995	Catwalk	Double J	7 episodes
1995	Harrison Bergeron	Phillipa	Television film
2000	Anne of Green Gables: The Continuing Story	Josie Pye Spurgeon	2 episodes

=== Producing ===
==== Film ====
Year	Title	Notes
2005	Cake	
2006	Pu-239	
2009	Adam	
2010	Beginners	
2012	Thanks for Sharing	
2014	The Backward Class	Documentary
2018	The Seagull	
2018	The Grizzlies	

==== Television ====
Year	Title	Notes
2009	Wild Roses	Executive producer; also writer and creator
2017–2019	Anne with an E	Executive producer
2023	Black Life: Untold Stories	Executive producer
