= Aaju Peter =

Inuk lawyer, activist and sealskin clothes designer (born 1960)

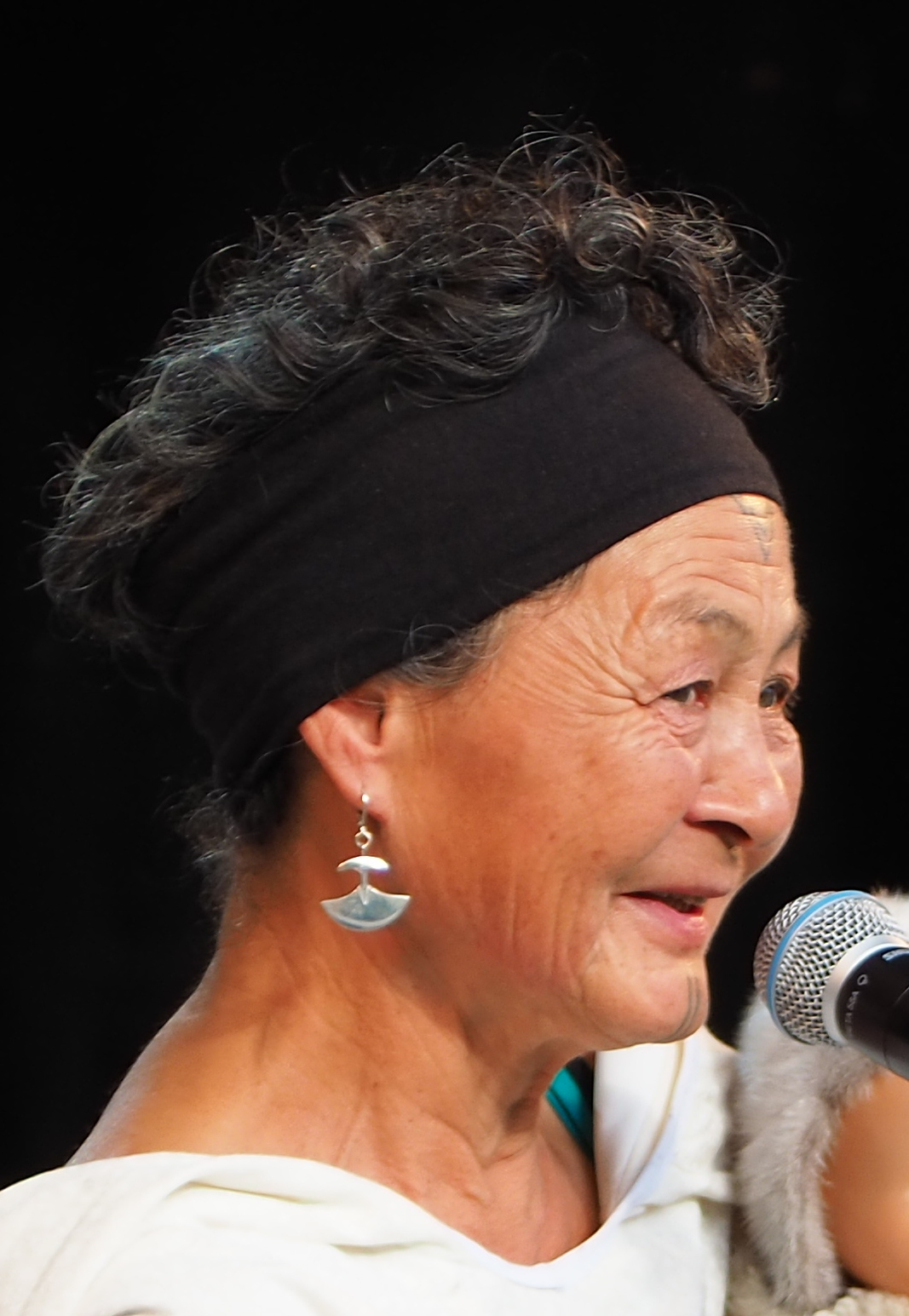
Aaju Peter at the opening ceremony at Riddu Riđđu 2019.

Aaju Peter CM (born 1960) is an Inuk lawyer, activist and sealskin clothes designer. In 2012, she received the Order of Canada. She has appeared in the documentary films Arctic Defenders (2013) and Angry Inuk (2016). She was also profiled in the 2023 documentary film Twice Colonized.

== Biography ==
Peter was born in Arkisserniaq, Greenland in 1960 to an Inuit family. Her father was a teacher and pastor. At the age of eleven, she was sent to study in Denmark. In the 1980s Peter married a man from Nunavut and moved to Frobisher Bay, now Iqaluit. She raised five children on her own and still resides in Iqaluit.

Peter was awarded the Order of Canada on May 26, 2011.

She has travelled across Greenland, Europe, and Canada, performing modern drum dance and traditional singing and displaying sealskin fashions. She graduated from Akitsiraq Law School in 2005 and was called to the bar in 2007.

In 2019, Aaju Peter was a guest of the Université du Québec à Montréal, and a video was produced about her visit.
