= Stacey Aglok MacDonald =

Canadian Inuk director

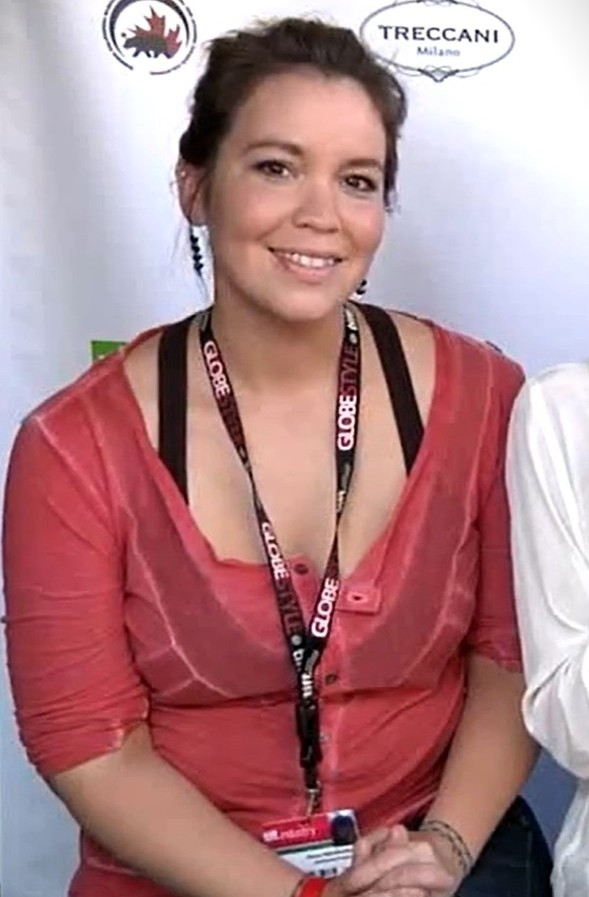
Aglok in 2011

Stacey Aglok MacDonald is an Inuk film and television producer from Kugluktuk, Nunavut, Canada.

Among her credits are the documentary film Twice Colonized, the films Throat Song, The Grizzlies and Slash/Back, and the television series Qanurli and North of North.

She is a partner with Alethea Arnaquq-Baril in the production firm Red Marrow Media.

In 2021, her sister, Emerald MacDonald, who portrayed Miranda Atatahak in The Grizzlies, was murdered.

== Accolades ==
Her short film, Throat Song, won the Best Live Action Short Drama at the 2013 Canadian Screen Awards.

Her documentary, Twice Colonized, was the 2024 winner for the Ted Rogers Best Feature Length Documentary at the Canadian Screen Awards.

North of North also has received several nominations. It was a 2026 Nominee for the Best New Scripted Series at the Film Independent Spirit Awards.Additionally, it received nominations in 2026 Nominee for Best Series and Best Writing in the Comedy category at the Canadian Screen Awards. Finally, the series was a 2025 Nominee for the Best Episodic Television Series at the Red Nation Film Festival.
