= Laakkuluk Williamson Bathory =

Kalaaleq artist from Canada (born 1979)

Laakkuluk Williamson
- Born: 1979 (age 46–47); Saskatoon, Saskatchewan, Canada
- Citizenship: Kalaaleq Inuk, Canadian
- Style: uaajeerneq
- Website: laakkuluk.com

Laakkuluk Williamson or Laakkuluk, is a Kalaaleq (Greenlandic Inuk) performance artist, spoken word poet, actor, storyteller and writer based in Iqaluit, Nunavut. She is known for performing uaajeerneq, a Greenlandic mask dance that involves storytelling and centers three elements: fear, humour and sexuality. Williamson describes uaajeerneq as both a political and cultural act and an idiosyncratic art form.

== Biography ==
Born and raised in Saskatoon, Saskatchewan, Williamson is of Inuk and British ancestry. Her mother, Karla Williamson, was one of the original recreators of uaajeerneq in the 1970s Greenlandic folk movement after the dance form was nearly eradicated by colonial missionaries in Greenland in the 18th–20th centuries. Williamson started learning uaajeerneq when she was thirteen and trained and performed with her mother throughout her teenage years in Saskatoon. She currently resides in Iqaluit, Nunavut with three children.

== Career ==
=== Artistic practice ===
Williamson has been active in the Inuit, Indigenous, and Canadian art scenes since the 1990s and describes uaajeerneq as the cornerstone of her artistic practice. In an interview in March 2018 she explained: "[Uaajeerneq] makes me both open and brave to try new things, to dig deeper. I write poetry, tell stories, create theatre, performance art, video, and all of it has some sort of aspect of uaajeerneq to it." Williamson describes uaajeerneq as playing with "four main themes: our humility as human beings in the vastness of the universe and our connection to our ancestors, sex, fear, and hilarity", and said that she "[touches] on all these themes in a performance, sometimes all at once, sometimes moving abruptly between them".

In 2016, Williamson offered her film Timiga Nunalu, Sikulu (My Body, The Land and The Ice) as her contribution to #callresponse, a collaborative project by Indigenous women artists including Christi Belcourt (Métis), Maria Hupfield (Anishinaabe), Ursula Johnson (Mi'kmaq), and Tania Willard (Secwepemc). In the film, Williamson works to dismantle stereotypes of the "Pocahottie" and speaks back against consistent sexual violence perpetrated against Indigenous women. Selected representations of #callresponse projects were displayed at grunt gallery in Vancouver, BC in October–December 2016.

Williamson frequently collaborates with Inuk throat singer and recording artist Tanya Tagaq, including an appearance in Tagaq's 2016 music video for "Retribution" and a 2015 co-performance for #callresponse. The pair also performed together in March 2018 as part of the Beyond Worlds series presented by the Chan Centre for the Performing Arts. Of her experiences working with Tagaq, Williamson said in 2018: "Once we started performing together, we realized how much we sink and fly through the same realms of consciousness to create performance – her through her voice and me through my mask dancing. It is an incredible experience to perform together: we are unique from one another and heighten one another at the same time."

=== Qaggiavuut! Society ===
Along with several other grassroots Inuit performing artists, Williamson is a founding member of the Qaggiavuut! Society for a Nunavut Performing Arts Centre, a community-based organization that supports Inuit artists and is working toward building a community-centered performing arts centre in Iqaluit. Qaggiavuut! Society has been operating as a volunteer organization since 2009, and in January 2016 won the Arctic Inspiration Prize – the first time an arts-based organization has ever won the prize. Beyond its goal of creating a Nunavut performing arts space, the organization also works to expand performing arts training for Inuit artists, to build economic opportunities for artists in the Arctic, to maintain at-risk Inuit performance art forms, and to nurture the creation of new Inuit performing arts work. Williamson began working as a program manager for the Qaggiavuut! Society in 2016.

=== Awards ===
In 2021, Williamson won the Sobey Art Award, for which the Jury says her "performance practice courageously defies preconceived notions through embodied lived experience."

== Performance works ==
- Tulugak: Inuit Raven Stories, with Sylvia Cloutier, 2013
- Retribution, with Tanya Tagaq, 2016
- Kiviuq Returns, with Qaggiavuut! Society for a Nunavut Performing Arts Centre, 2017
- Visions and Dreams—Northern Light, CBC, VTPL, 2003
- Hunter's Journey—Dancing with Spirit TV series, Bravo, 2007
- Throat Song, Kajutaijuq, The Grizzlies (film)

== Group exhibitions ==
- The Fifth World, Kitchener–Waterloo Art Gallery, 2016
- Timiga Nunalu, Sikulu (film), for #callresponse, grunt gallery, 2016

== Solo exhibitions ==
- Naak silavit qeqqa? Art Gallery of Ontario, 2022–2023

== Curation ==
- Ilitarivingaa? exhibit, Art Gallery of Ontario, 2004
- Inuit Art in Motion exhibit, with Anna Hudson, Art Gallery of Ontario, 2003

== Written works ==
- "Talluriutiup Tariunga"—Oceans North Canada, 2015
- "We are a Nation of Lovers"—Up Here Magazine, 2015
- "Dog Children"—The North-South Project: An Anthology of the Lost, 2015
- From the Moon to the Belly postcard project, with Maria Hupfield, 2012
- "How Akutaq Came to Be"—Pith and Wry, 2011
- "Aqausiit: Can You Hear How Much Love You Evoke In Me?!"—Native Studies Review 20(2), 2011
- "Inuit gender parity and why it was not accepted in the Nunavut legislature"—Études huit 30(1), 2006
