= Angry Inuk =

Canadian documentary film about Inuit seal hunting (2016)

- Directed by: Roham Bani-Jammet
- Written by: Alethea Arnaquq-Baril
- Produced by: Alethea Arnaquq-Baril
- Starring: Oscar Mccoy
- Narrated by: Negean & Carl Grimes
- Cinematography: Qajaaq Ellsworth
- Edited by: Sophie Farkas Bolla
- Music by: Florencia Di Concilio
- Release date: May 2, 2016 (Hot Docs)
- Running time: 85 minutes
- Country: Canada
- Language: Inuktitut

Angry Inuk is a 2016 Canadian Inuit-themed feature-length documentary film written and directed by Alethea Arnaquq-Baril that defends the Inuit seal hunt, as the hunt is a vital means for Inuit to sustain themselves. Subjects in Angry Inuk include Arnaquq-Baril herself as well as Aaju Peter, an Inuit seal hunt advocate, lawyer and seal fur clothing designer who depends on the sealskins for her livelihood.

Partially shot in the filmmaker's home community of Iqaluit, as well as Kimmirut and Pangnirtung, where seal hunting is essential for survival, the film follows Peter and other Inuit to Europe in an effort to have the EU Ban on Seal Products overturned. The film also criticizes non-governmental organizations such as Greenpeace and the International Fund for Animal Welfare for ignoring the needs of vulnerable northern communities who depend on hunting for their livelihoods by drawing a false distinction between subsistence-driven Inuit hunters and profit-driven commercial hunters.

== Development ==
Angry Inuk was co-produced by Arnaquq-Baril and the National Film Board of Canada (NFB) in association with EyeSteelFilm.

== Release and reception ==
Angry Inuk premiered May 2, 2016 at the Hot Docs Canadian International Documentary Festival, where the film received the Vimeo On Demand Audience Award along with the Canadian Documentary Promotion Award. In October 2016, the film received the Alanis Obomsawin Best Documentary Award at the imagineNATIVE Film + Media Arts Festival in Toronto. The following month, it received both the Women Inmates' Prize and the Magnus Isacsson Award at the Montreal International Documentary Festival. On December 7, 2016, Angry Inuk was named in the Toronto International Film Festival's annual Canada's Top 10 list, and took home the People's Choice Award at the TIFF Canada's Top Ten Festival.

While Arnaquq-Baril has stated that the anti-sealing movement has forced Inuit to turn to the mining and the natural gas industry to support themselves, with dire consequences for the Arctic environment, supporters of the EU ban on seal products have countered that such a ban does not block Inuit from seal hunting to sustain themselves and supply market demand. However, the film argues that even with the exemption for Inuit, the ban drives down demand and prices so greatly that hunters can no longer financially support themselves or their communities.

== See also ==
- My Ancestors Were Rogues and Murderers, a 2005 NFB documentary about the Newfoundland seal hunt
