= Throat Song =

- Film poster
- Directed by: Miranda de Pencier
- Written by: Miranda de Pencier
- Produced by: Stacey Aglok Macdonald; Miranda de Pencier; Alethea Arnaquq-Baril; Qajaaq Ellsworth
- Starring: Ippiksaut Friesen; Paul Nutarariaq
- Cinematography: Seamus Tierney
- Edited by: Geoff Ashenhurst; Riel Roch Decter
- Music by: Gabriel Morley
- Production companies: Puhitaq; Northwood Productions
- Release date: September 11, 2011 (TIFF)
- Running time: 17 minutes
- Country: Canada
- Language: English

Throat Song is a 2011 Canadian short drama film directed by Miranda de Pencier. The film stars Ippiksaut Friesen as Ippik, an Inuk woman in Nunavut who is trapped in an abusive relationship, and begins to heal her spirit and find her own voice after taking a job as a witness assistant for the government's justice department, aiding other victims of domestic violence.

The film premiered at the 2011 Toronto International Film Festival.

== Plot ==
The film opens with young Inuk girl Ippik happily running across the tundra to her grandmother and throat singing with her. In Iqaluit, Nunavut, adult Ippik begins work as a witness assistant at the Nunavut Department of Justice, interviewing victims of domestic violence and sexual assault. Her husband Inuusiq is implied to have a drinking problem. Their puppy is tied up outside their house, and Ippik tells him the chain is too short. Despite being physically and verbally affectionate with the puppy, Inuusiq leaves the chain alone.

Ippik starts work and interviews Sam and her mother to confirm their witness statement. Sam's mother confirms the report that her husband fatally stabbed her son during an argument. Ippik talks to Tanner, a teenage boy who was sexually assaulted by his coach, and explains how to give testimony to the crime prosecutor, to his despair. Returning home, Ippik tugs at the puppy's chain in vain to loosen it. Inuusiq accuses Ippik of hiding his alcohol and physically assaults her before having sex with her. He tells her he is going away to hunt for a few days. Ippik stumbles through a court preparation interview with a mother and her young daughter Naja, and realises the rape occurred to Naja. Through a flashback, Ippik is implied to have been sexually assaulted by her uncle as a child.

The interviews with the various victims are interspersed with shots of a young Ippik desperately running through the tundra and culminating in a scream, and of an adult Ippik attempting various forms of suicide such as hanging or wrist cutting. Later, she attempts to commit suicide with a hunting rifle, but hears the whining of the puppy and shoots its chain instead. Inuusiq returns to find the house empty. Ippik is shown having reclaimed her voice, throat singing as she leads the puppy over the Arctic tundra.

== Cast ==
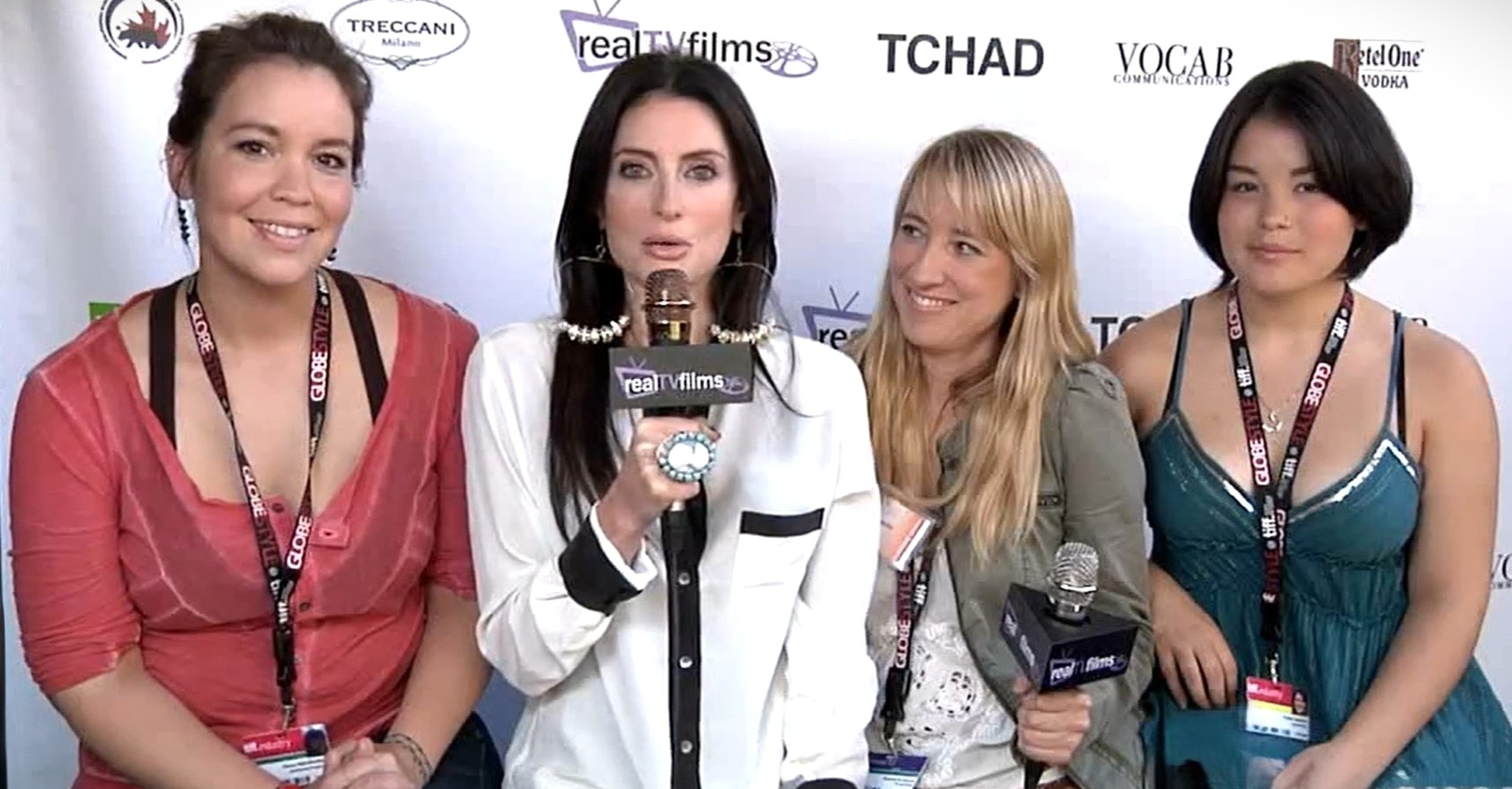
Left to right: Producer Stacey Aglok, interviewer Samantha Gutstadt, director Miranda de Pencier, actress Ippiksaut Friesen, in 2011

- Ippiksaut Friesen as Ippik
- Dodie Netser as young Ippik
- Maata Michael as Inuusiq
- Brian Tagalik as Frankie
- Miali Buscemi as Sam
- Paul Nutarariaq as Tanner
- Laakkuluk Williamson as hip receptionist
- Ellen Hamilton as government worker
- Jennifer Kilabuk as Jennifer, Naja's mother
- Maya Illnik as Naja
- Beatrice Ikkidluak as Ippik's grandmother
- Allen Auksaq as Ippik's uncle

== Accolades ==
The film won the Canadian Screen Award for Best Live Action Short Drama at the 1st Canadian Screen Awards. The film made the preliminary shortlist of finalists for the Academy Award for Best Live Action Short Film going into the 86th Academy Awards, but was not selected as one of the final five nominees.
