= Alethea Arnaquq-Baril =

Canadian Inuk filmmaker (born 1978)

Alethea Arnaquq-Baril MSC
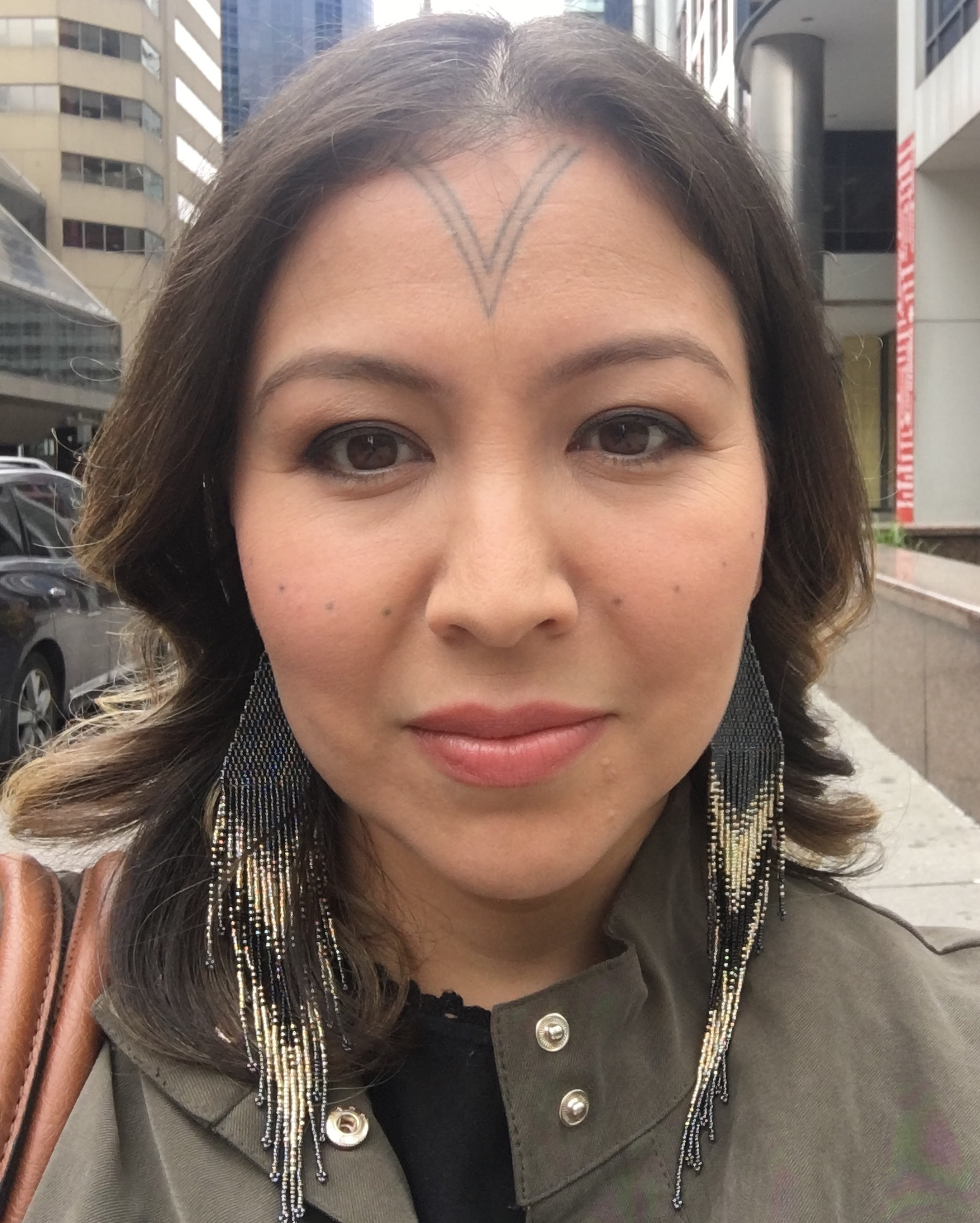
- Arnaquq-Baril in 2018
- Born: May 9, 1978 (age 48); Frobisher Bay, Northwest Territories, Canada (now Iqaluit, Nunavut)
- Education: Sheridan College
- Occupations: producer; director; screenwriter; animator
- Writing career
- Genres: Documentary, Feature Films, Short Films
- Subject: Inuit culture
- Notable works: Tunnit: Retracing the Lines of Inuit Tattoos (2010); Angry Inuk (2016)
- Notable awards: Canada's Meritorious Service Cross (MSC) in 2017

Alethea Arnaquq-Baril MSC (born May 9, 1978) is an Inuk filmmaker, known for her work on Inuit life and culture. She is the owner of Unikkaat Studios, a production company in Iqaluit, which produces Inuktitut films. She was awarded the Canadian Meritorious Service Cross, in 2017 in recognition of her work as an activist and filmmaker. She currently works part-time at the Qanak Collective, a social project which supports Inuit empowerment initiatives.

== Early life ==
Alethea Arnaquq-Baril was born and raised in Iqaluit, Nunavut, Canada. Her mother is an Inuk teacher with a Masters in Education and her father was a radio broadcaster with the Canadian Broadcasting Corporation (CBC), and later a senior manager in Information Technology.

Arnaquq-Baril began studying mathematics at the University of Waterloo, Ontario, intending to be a video game designer. Her interest in story telling led her to transfer to Sheridan College in Ontario, where she graduated from the college's Institute of Technology and Advanced Learning's program in illustration. Arnaquq-Baril also completed animation training at the Banff Centre in a program offered by the National Film Board of Canada.

In 2011, Arnaquq-Baril told the Canadian Broadcasting Corporation that, with most of Inuit culture passed on through oral history, her goal was to record that history "while the last elders that traditionally lived on the land are still alive".

== Film career ==
Arnaquq-Baril began her film career as a producer with the documentary James Houston: The Most Interesting Group of People You'll Ever Meet (2008) and as co-producer of The Experimental Eskimos (2009). She wrote and directed her first film, an animated short film sponsored by the National Film Board of Canada (NFB), titled Lumaajuuq: The Blind Boy and the Loon, which was released in 2009. Arnaquq-Baril subsequently wrote a children's book based on the film with illustrator, Daniel Gies. The book is titled The Blind Boy and the Loon and was published in 2014. It is available in English and Inuktitut.

Arnaquq-Baril directed her first full-length film, Tunnit: Retracing the Lines of Inuit Tattoos (2010), a personal documentary about her journey to explore the lost tradition of Inuit facial tattoos or kakiniit. Between 2011 and 2018, Arnaquq-Baril has worked on five other films in various roles as producer, director and screenwriter. She produces Inuit cultural documentaries and Inuktitut films through her own production company, Unikkaat Studios. She also previously co-owned Tajarniit Productions, a collaborative project with Inuit women filmmakers Myna Ishulutak, Jolene Arreak and Stacey Aglok MacDonald. She was named by the Toronto International Film Festival as one of Canada's most important women filmmakers in 2017. Angry Inuk won the DOC Vanguard award, the Vimeo On Demand Audience Award and the Canadian Documentary Promotion Award, among others.

In 2017, Arnaquq-Baril was awarded Canada's Meritorious Service Cross, "in recognition of her work as an activist and filmmaker". She currently works part-time with the Qanak Collective, which supports Inuit empowerment projects.

Arnaquq-Baril and MacDonald cocreated the television comedy series North of North, which premiered in 2025.

=== Lumaajuuq: The Blind Boy and the Loon (2009) ===
The animated, short film Lumaajuuq: The Blind Boy and the Loon, is an adaption of a traditional Inuit story (The Blind Man and the Loon) about a widowed mother who takes out her sorrow on her only son and treats him cruelly. Once a great hunter, the son is now blind. He later travels to a lake where a loon reveals to him that it was his mother who cursed away his sight. With the loon's help, the young man regains his vision. Overcome with his own rage, the young man seeks revenge and his actions bring him lifelong suffering. The film won best Canadian Short Drama at the imagineNATIVE Film and Media Arts Festival in 2010 as well as the Golden Sheaf Award for Best Indigenous category at the Yorkton Film Festival.

=== Tunniit: Retracing the Lines of Inuit Tattoos (2010) ===
The documentary Tunniit: Retracing the Lines of Inuit Tattoos, examines the tradition of tunniit (face tattooing) among Inuit women, nearly forgotten and, at one time, forbidden. Arnaquq-Baril embarks on a personal journey, interviewing members of the Inuit community. Meeting resistance from some of her fellow Inuit, she eventually finds a number of elders willing to talk about the tattoos, and learns about the dramatic cultural changes that led to their decline."

=== Inuit High Kick (2010) ===
Arnaquq-Baril directed Inuit High Kick, a 2:48 documentary of Inuk athlete Johnny Issaluk performing a one-foot high kick in slow motion. The documentary was produced as part of the cultural celebrations for the Vancouver 2010 Olympics.

=== Aviliaq: Entwined (2014) ===
Arnaquq-Baril released the short film Aviliaq: Entwined in 2014. A drama set in the 1950s Arctic, it tells the story of two Inuit lesbians struggling to stay together after one of them marries. The film addresses the issues of sexuality and family structure in the Inuit culture during a period of colonization.

=== Angry Inuk (2016) ===
Angry Inuk is a full-length film which examines the important role of seal hunting in Inuit culture and the negative impact that activist organizations trying to stop the seal hunt have had on the lives of the Inuit. The film premiered at the Hot Docs Canadian International Documentary Festival, where the film received the Vimeo On Demand Audience Award along with the Canadian Documentary Promotion Award. It has since screened at many film festivals. On December 1, 2016, Arnaquq-Baril received the DOC Vanguard Award from the Documentary Organization of Canada.Angry Inuk was also included in the list of "Canada's Top Ten" feature films of 2016, selected by a panel of filmmakers and industry professionals organized by TIFF, where it also won the Audience Choice Award.

=== North of North (2025) ===
North of North is an eight episode comedy series that premiered on CBC, APTN, and Netflix in 2025, and is set to release its second season in 2026. The series, set in the fictional town of Ice Cove, Nunavut, follows Siaja, a young modern Inuk woman as she leaves her husband and makes her own way in the world. North of North has received several award nominations. It was a 2026 Nominee for the Best New Scripted Series at the Film Independent Spirit Awards. Additionally, it received nominations in 2026 Nominee for Best Series and Best Writing in the Comedy category at the Canadian Screen Awards. Finally, the series was a 2025 Nominee for the Best Episodic Television Series at the Red Nation Film Festival.

== Activism ==
Arnaquq-Baril advocates for the continuation of the Arctic seal hunt.

== Selected filmography ==
Year	Film	Role	Notes
2018	The Grizzlies	Producer	Based on a true story about a youth lacrosse team created to stop an epidemic of youth suicide in the community of Kugluktuk, Nunavut, Canada.
2016	Angry Inuk	Producer, director, screenwriter	Documentary full-length film examines the role of seal hunting in Inuit culture and the detrimental effect that international campaigns against the seal hunt have had on the lives of the Inuit.
2015	The Embargo Project	Producer, director, screenwriter	An anthology of five short films written and directed by five Indigenous women filmmakers.
2014	Aviliaq: Entwined	Producer, screenwriter, director	Short drama set in the 1950s Arctic, which tells the story of two Inuit lesbians struggling to stay together after one of them marries.
2011	Throat Song	Executive producer	Set in the Canadian Arctic, the story of an Inuk woman trapped in an abusive relationship, who begins to heal and finds her voice after connecting with other victims of violence. The title reflects Inuit throat singing performed by two women.
2010	Seven Sins: Sloth	Director, screenwriter	Short animated satire about the Inuit.
2010	Tunniit: Retracing the Lines of Inuit Tattoos	Producer, director, screenwriter	A documentary film that chronicles the lost tradition of face tattooing among Inuit women and advocates for the revival of the once forbidden art.
2009	Lumaajuuq: The Blind Boy and the Loon	Director, screenwriter	A short film adaption of a traditional Inuit story which explains the origin of the narwhal and illustrates the dangers of seeking revenge.
2009	The Experimental Eskimos	Producer	The story of three 12-year old Inuit boys who were taken from their families in the 1960s to be raised by white families in Ottawa as part of a social experiment.
2008	James Houston: The Most Interesting Group of People You'll Ever Meet	Producer	A documentary on the life of artist, James Houston, who introduced Inuit art to the world and worked collaboratively with Inuit artists in creating the acclaimed art co-operative, Kinngait Studios.
2025-present	North of North	Creator	

== Selected publications ==
- Arnaquq-Baril, Alethea (2014). The Blind Boy and the Loon. Inhabit Media. p. 48. ISBN 978-1927095577.

== Awards ==
- 2008 James Houston: The Most Interesting Group of People You'll Ever Meet won Allan King Award For Excellence in Documentary
- 2010 Lumaajuuq: The Blind Boy and the Loon won best Canadian Short Drama at the imagineNATIVE festival in 2010
- 2011 Throat Song won Best Live Action Short Drama, Academy Awards shortlist (2014).
- 2016 Angry Inuk received the Vimeo On Demand Audience Award along with the Canadian Documentary Promotion Award
- 2016 Angry Inuk 2016 winner of Audience Choice award at HotDocs
- 2016 Angry Inuk 2016 winner of the Alanis Obomsawin Best Documentary Award
- 2017 Angry Inuk Santa Barbara International Film Festival winner Social Justice Award
- 2017 Arnaquq-Baril named by the Toronto International Film Festival as one of Canada's most important women filmmakers
