= Fort Albany First Nation =

Canadian settlement

Fort Albany
- Band No. 142
- ᐲᐦᑖᐯᒄ ᐃᓕᓕᐗᒃ (pîhtâpek ililiwak)
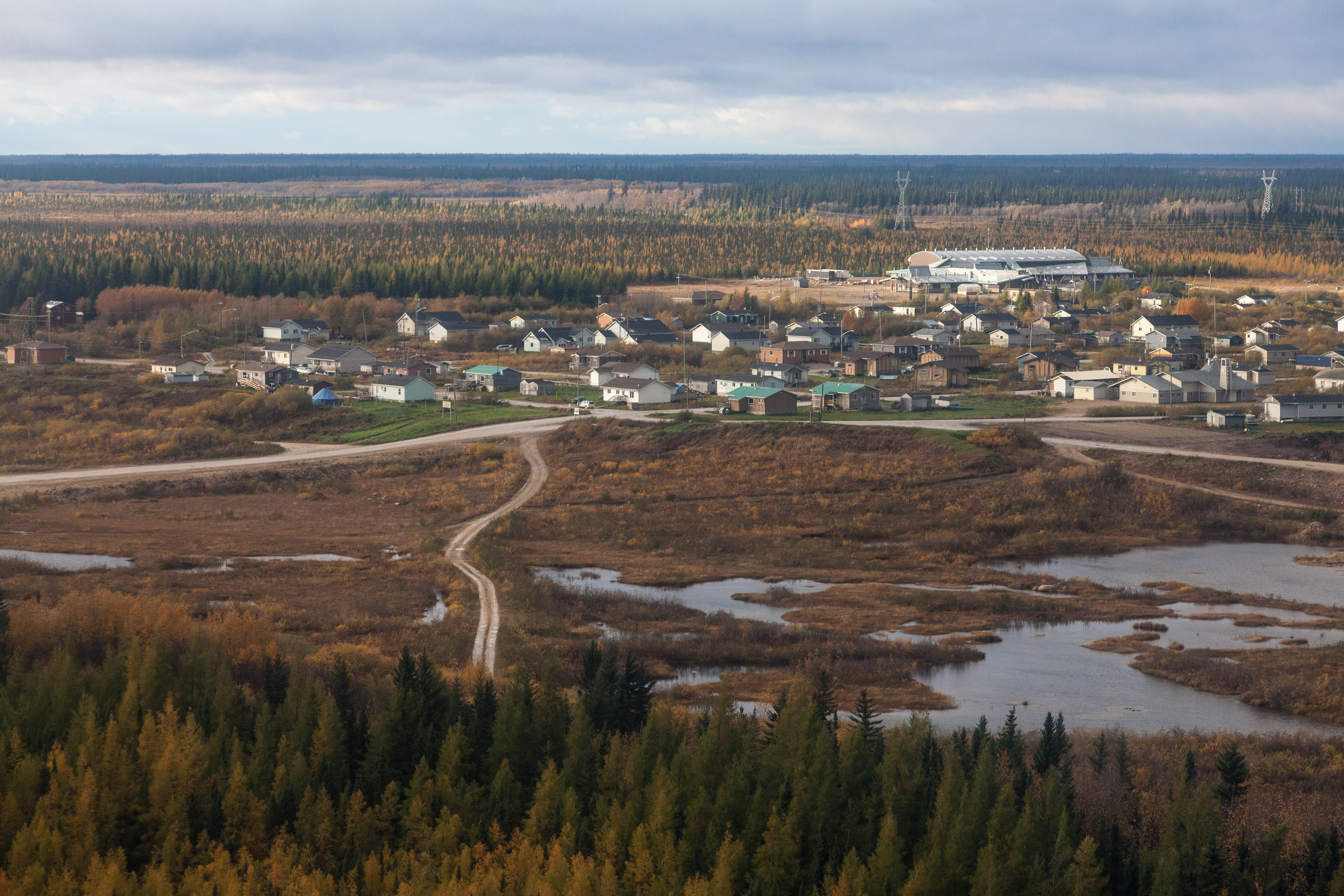
- Fort Albany First Nation, 2012
- People: Cree
- Treaty: 9
- Province: Ontario

Land
- Main reserve: Fort Albany 67
- Land area: 363.457 km^{2} (140.332 sq mi)

Population (October 2024)
- On reserve: 3309 (Note: includes Kashechewan)
- On other land: 101
- Off reserve: 2187
- Total population: 5597

Government
- Chief: Andrew Solomon
- Council: Robert Nakogee (Deputy Chief); Mary Sutherland; Marie Knapaysweet; Lorna Sutherland; Randy Knapaysweet; Agatha Nakogee; Micheline Loone; Michel Ashamock

Tribal Council
- Mushkegowuk Council

Location of Fort Albany within Ontario

Fort Albany First Nation (Cree: ᐲᐦᑖᐯᒄ ᐃᓕᓕᐗᒃ pîhtâpek ililiwak, "lagoon Cree") is a Cree First Nation in Cochrane District in Northeastern Ontario, Canada, within the territory covered by Treaty 9. Situated on the southern shore of the Albany River on the west coast of James Bay, Fort Albany First Nation is accessible only by air, water, or by winter road. It is roughly 129km (80mi) away from Moose Factory, and 415km (257mi) away from Timmins

The First Nation is a signatory of Treaty 9, and is part of the Mushkegowuk Council, within the Nishnawbe Aski Nation. The community is policed by the Nishnawbe-Aski Police Service, an Indigenous police service. It shares band members and the Fort Albany 67 Indian Reserve with the Kashechewan First Nation, which separated from Fort Albany starting in the late 1950s. Fort Albany First Nation is situated on Sinclair and Anderson Islands, as well as on the south shore on the mainland of the river. The Nation controls the Fort Albany Indian Settlement on the south shore of the Albany River, and the Kashechewan First Nation controls the Kashechewan Indian Settlement directly across the river.

The First Nation is located near the former site of Fort Albany, one of the oldest Hudson's Bay Company trading posts, from which it gets its English name. The current community is not the site of the old post, which was re-located several times including on Anderson Island, Albany Island (c.1721) and a location just northeast of the current community. The last trading post was closed up around the 1950s. All the post sites have disappeared and naturalized, leaving no trace of their former use.

== History ==
The Mushkegowuk or Swampy Cree and their ancestors have hunted, fished, gathered, and lived on the western shore of James Bay (Wînipekw) and in the Albany River (Kistachowan) watershed for thousands of years. Traditional ways of living involved sharing the territory with other Algonquian peoples, including the Anishinaabe in times of peace, with people from different nations reaffirming good relations through "gift-giving and feasting, and accompanied by speech-making."

Traditional Mushkegowuk society was based around the extended family, organized into loose patrilineal bands. During the winter, these bands distributed themselves along the river watershed, and congregated into larger groups of 300-700 people at prime fishing locations in the summer.^{:42} While the current site of Fort Albany was an occasional gathering point for some, the idea of the mouth of the river as a community distinct from any other Mushkegowuk band did not emerge until the colonial period.

=== Fur trade ===
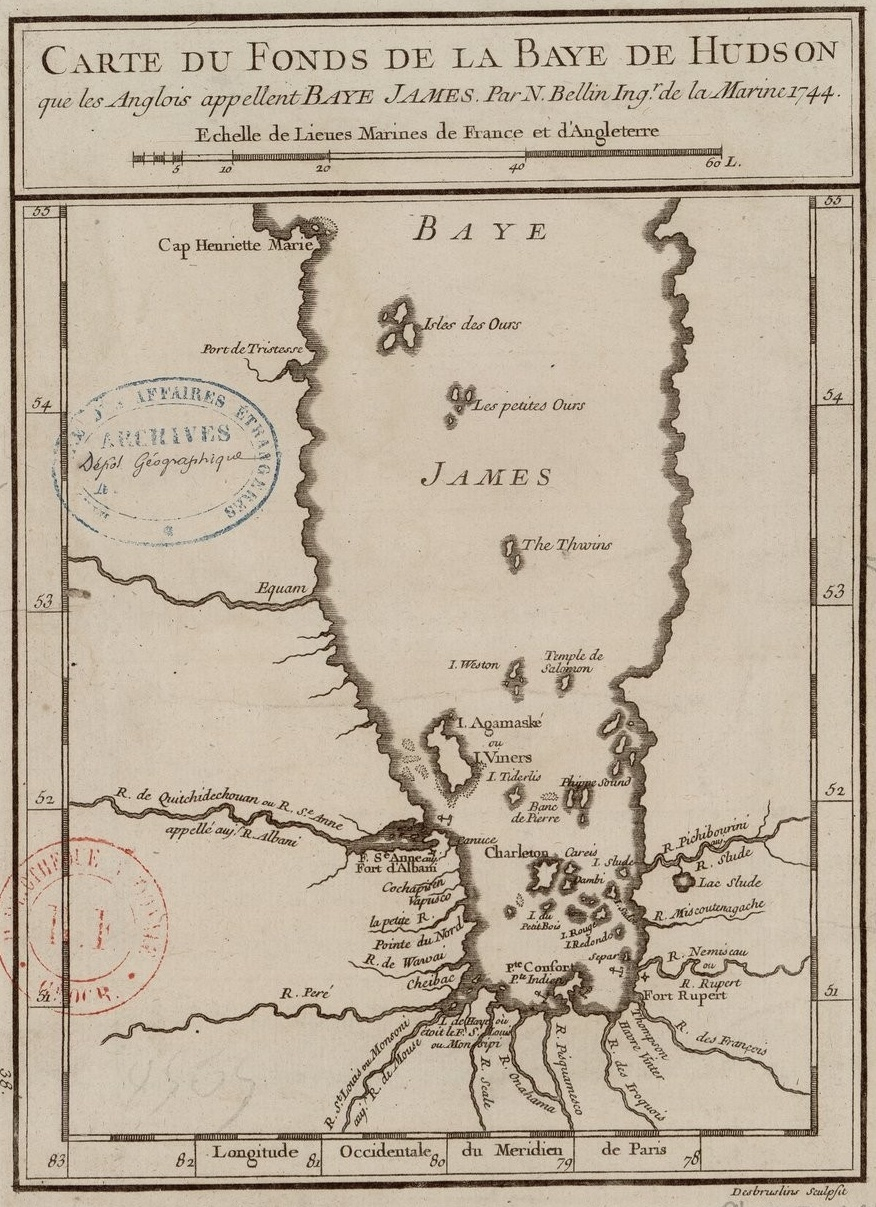
1744 Map of James Bay, including "Fort Saint-Anne", the French name for Fort Albany

Around 1675, Charles Bayly, the first overseas governor of the Hudson's Bay Company explored the area around the mouth of the Albany river. In 1679, he established a trading post at the site, where the company traded goods with the Indigenous people of the area.

During the ensuing centuries of the fur trade era, the Mushkegowuk did not sell or give away any land, but traded furs and goods with the traders at the posts, who numbered no more than a few dozen at a time.

As of 1856, the Hudson's Bay Company estimated that there were 1,100 Indians living in the Albany District, which at the time included the trading posts of Fort Albany, Marten Falls, Osnaburg, and Lac Seul.^{:489}

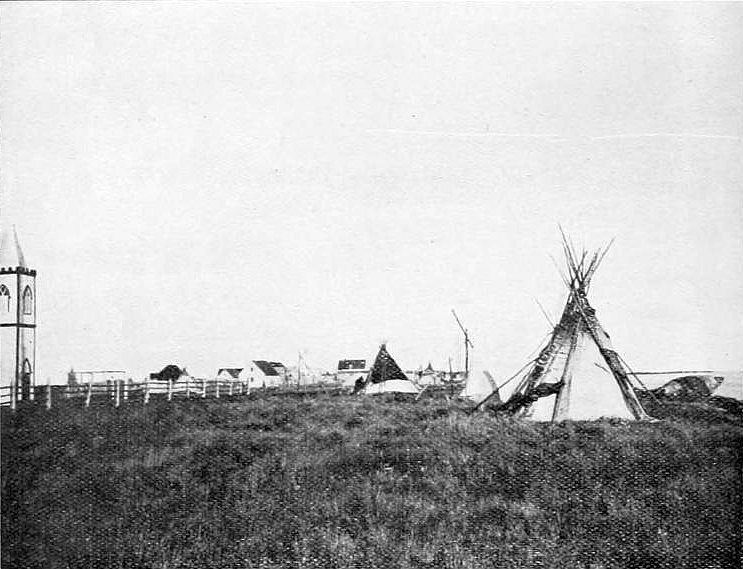
Fort Albany, 1898

The Canadian Pacific Railway was completed in 1885, passing near the height of the land that defined the James and Hudson Bay watershed. Between Confederation, the Canadian acquisition of Rupert's Land, and the new railroad, Indigenous people living in the James Bay watershed faced many problems including declining animal resources, sickness, and trespassing European poachers and mining prospectors.

In the late nineteenth century, the ancestors of the present-day Fort Albany and Kashechewan First Nations people established their first settlement in the area, known as Old Post. The site was occupied until the mid-1950s, when families were forced to relocate due to intense spring flooding of the area.

=== Treaty No. 9 ===
In order to ensure the protection of their rights, as well as to halt the decline of the local beaver population, Indigenous leaders petitioned the Dominion government to make a treaty. They were asking for a treaty along the lines of the nearby Robinson Treaties of 1870 and Treaty 3 of 1873. At first, due to conflict over provincial boundaries, jurisdiction over natural resources, and how much responsibility province's had to pay treaty annuities, Canada ignored the requests. Following a petition from local Indigenous leaders in summer 1901, the treaty-making process begun.

Upon the discovery in 1904 of minerals in Northwestern Ontario, the creation of a treaty became more urgent for the government of Canada. In negotiations with the provincial government, they set about creating a treaty in order to secure the possibility of mining, timber, rail, and hydro-electric development in the region. By May 1905, Canada and Ontario were determining the terms of the written treaty. According to an exhibit by the Archives of Ontario, the Province's demands included "that no Indigenous reserves in the treaty territory would be located in areas with hydro-electricity development potential greater than 500 horsepower." The Dominion and the Province agreed to the terms of Treaty No. 9 (also known as The James Bay Treaty) in July 1905, without consulting any Indigenous peoples, who they then went to for ratification.

The Treaty Expedition, which included Duncan Campbell Scott, traveled down the Albany River and held a signing ceremony at Fort Albany on August 3, 1905. Fort Albany was their fourth signing on the 1905 voyage. The expedition explained some aspects of the agreement to community representatives through interpreters, after which the representatives signed with their names or a cross. The community was then given a Union Jack, and cash gifts were offered to each community member, most receiving $8 and a promise of a $4 annuity. The paylist booklet for the Fort Albany visit recorded 201 families in the community, with 278 total people receiving their gift. Charlie Stephen was the Chief that signed with an X on behalf of the Fort Albany community, along with nine headmen, who also signed with an X.

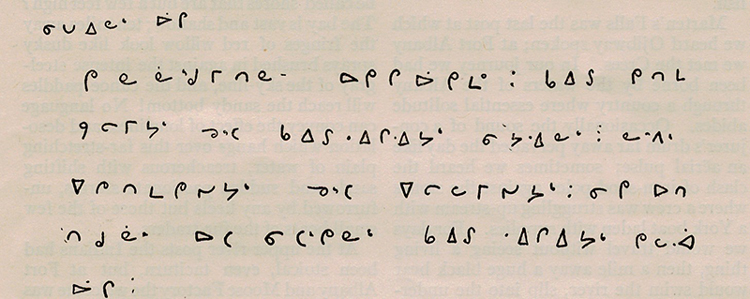
A portion of the address made by William Goodwin at the signing ceremony

According to the journals of Commissioners Scott and Stewart, both Indian Affairs employees, "full explanations were given of the Treaty and its provisions" and the signing meeting included "[making] choice of Reserve." The third commissioner, a miner from Perth representing Ontario, explained in further detail in his journal what was discussed, namely the gift and annuity, that the King "wished to set aside a tract of land for their sole use and benefit upon wh[ich] no white man would be permitted to trespass," and that the King had ordered a feast of tea and bannock. It is not clear whether the commissioners promised that the Crees' hunting and fishing rights would be unchanged, or that nobody would have to live on reserve, both of which were promised when the expedition reached Moose Factory and New Post. Following the explanation of the treaty, William Goodwin spoke on behalf of the community, and presented his message in Cree syllabics, expressing their thanks to the King. Part of Goodwin's message was reproduced in a 1906 magazine article by Scott. Following the signing and payment, a celebratory feast took place, medicine was offered, and the expedition moved on, travelling down the coast in York boats to Moose Factory.

=== Fort Albany First Nation ===
The text of Treaty 9 called for reserve lands to be set aside based on a proportion of 1 square mile (2.6 square kilometres) per family of five, as well as establishing a band government organized under the Indian Act.

==== St. Anne's Indian Residential School ====
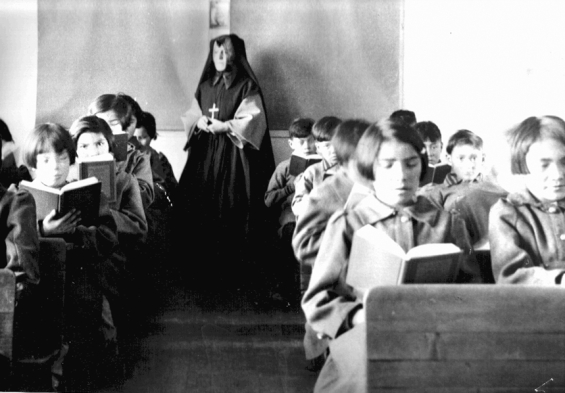
Students in class at St. Anne's overseen by a nun c. 1945

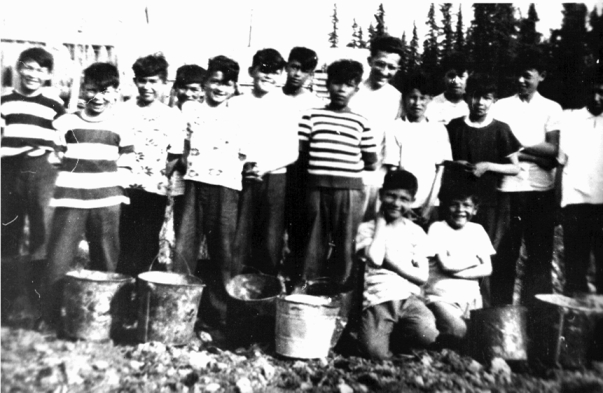
Male students outside at St. Anne's c. 1945

The treaty also promised to provide for the salaries of teachers, and the cost of school buildings and equipment "as may seem advisable to His Majesty's government of Canada." In 1906, the federal government began funding St. Anne's Indian Residential School, which had opened under the direction of the Oblates of Mary Immaculate and the Grey Nuns of the Cross in 1902 at the site of the Fort Albany Mission on Albany Island. The school was part of the Canadian Indian residential school system.

According to the Indigenous Peoples Atlas of Canada, St. Anne's "was home to some of the most harrowing examples of abuse against Indigenous children in Canada." Students at the school came from First Nations around the James Bay region, including Fort Albany, Attawapiskat, Weenusk, Constance Lake, Moose Fort, and Fort Severn. The school was relocated to the north shore of the Albany River in 1932. It burned down in 1939 and was rebuilt. Once the Ste-Thérèse-de-l'Enfant-Jesus residential school in Chisasibi opened in the 1930s, children from Fort Albany also attended that school.

The Government of Canada took over the management of St. Anne's in 1965, and took over the residence in 1970. In 1976, the residence stopped operating, and the school was transferred to the Fort Albany band council. In 1990, then-chief of Fort Albany Edmund Metatawabin set in motion a reunion conference about the abuses he and other residential school survivors had experienced at the school, which led a 5-year long investigation including 900 interviews, and finally to seven people being charged with criminal offences in the late 90s, with another former staff member charged in 2023.

The school's rectory burned down in 2001, around the same time that a new school building was completed to replace it.

==== End of the fur trade ====
In the 1950s and 1960s, the fur trade era was coming to an end, and the Cree had begun to adopt a more sedentary lifestyle. Around this time, the Old Post site was abandoned in favour of the current site of Fort Albany, on the eastern end of Sinclair Island.^{:69} The federal government began to provide housing for Cree people who wanted to settle permanently at Fort Albany, and government transfer payments began, initially around $35 per year for most families.^{:69} With increased community organization and concentrated resources, Indigenous people began more vocally to assert their rights to the federal government, demanding new infrastructure, Indigenous rights, and self-government.^{:50} The Grand Council of Treaty 9 was founded in February 1973 as an advocacy organization for First Nations governments party to Treaty 9. It later reorganized into the Nishnawbe Aski Nation.

==== Establishment of Kashechewan ====
In the 1950s, the Old Post on Albany Island in the middle of the river was abandoned, and the community split in two: one on the south shore of the river, Sinclair Island, and Andersen Island which became Fort Albany First Nation, and one on the north shore of the river, which became Kashechewan First Nation. The exact events leading up to the separation of the two communities varies by source, with some citing intense flooding, some citing pressure from the federal government, and some citing sectarian violence between Anglican and Roman Catholic segments of the community.^{:35}^{:111} Whatever the case, by 1960, the Department of Indian Affairs recognized the new community as independent, but Fort Albany and Kashechewan continued to share the same chief and council.^{:70} In 1977 they came to have separate band councils. Fort Albany and Kashechewan are treated as separate bands, and function as separate bands today. Present-day Fort Albany is mostly a Roman Catholic community, while Kashechewan is mainly Anglican.

==== 1990s to present ====
In late 1994, Minister for Indian Affairs Ron Irwin visited Fort Albany, among other Western James Bay First Nations, on what independent magazine The Nation referred to as a "'fact-finding' visit." There, according to then Chair of the Mushkegowuk Council RoseAnne Archibald, he was "caught off guard" by a rally of students chanting demands for a new school building. According to The Nation, students had been pushing for a new school "for years," because the building housing the school at the time also housed the band office and education office, and was in constant need of repairs, having at one point been shut down upon the discovery of asbestos in the ceilings and walls. Ultimately, the minister's visit frustrated leaders in the region, since he did not commit to solutions for the problems they were presenting him with. A new school building finished construction in November 2001.

In 1995, the band council's bank account was frozen for five days when M. J. LaBelle Co. Ltd. enforced a garnishment against the government for $60,000 of debt. Chief Edmund Metatawabin characterized the ability of LaBelle and the Bank of Nova Scotia to halt all business in the community for five days as an example of institutional racism.

On July 2, 1996, Arthur Scott was elected to be the new chief of Fort Albany. Within a few months of Scott's election, a petition calling for his removal as chief was signed by 186 people, claiming that Scott was "arrogant and running the band undemocratically," including firing the elected education committee one year before their mandate expired. On September 5, 95 members of the band held what they referred to as a "custom election", the likes of which had not been seen in Fort Albany in around three decades. The "custom election" elected Bernard Sutherland as chief. Scott refused to step down, and did not recognize the "custom election", turning down his own nomination at the assembly. Scott alleged that the band's finances had been mismanaged by the previous council, and claimed that the band's construction company was not owned by the band, but by its former manager.

In 2007, mould, fungus, and dangerous toxins were found contaminating 26 recently-constructed houses, which caused residents to get sick. Deputy Chief of the Mushkegowuk Council Leo Friday and a local doctor offered building code violations, improper drainage, and faulty construction as possible causes. Commentators drew comparisons with similar problems faced by Kashechewan.

In late April 2008, Fort Albany experienced its worst flood since 1985, the result of ice floes breaking through the dikes constructed along the Albany River during the annual breakup. 334 people were evacuated to cities further south starting April 28, with around 300 more evacuated the following day out of a total population of around 900. Deputy Chief Andrew Linklater was disappointed by the federal government's delayed response.

On October 28, 2011, alongside Kashechewan and Attawapiskat, Fort Albany declared a state of emergency over a housing crisis that was forcing families into the cold due to a lack of housing.

From August 23 to 26, 2012, Fort Albany and Kashechewan held a gathering called Mamkeewanan: Protecting Paquataskamik at the Old Post site, their ancestors' first settlement in the area, to commemorate their shared history. Plans were made to put up signs around the site and plan further educational excursions.

== Geography ==
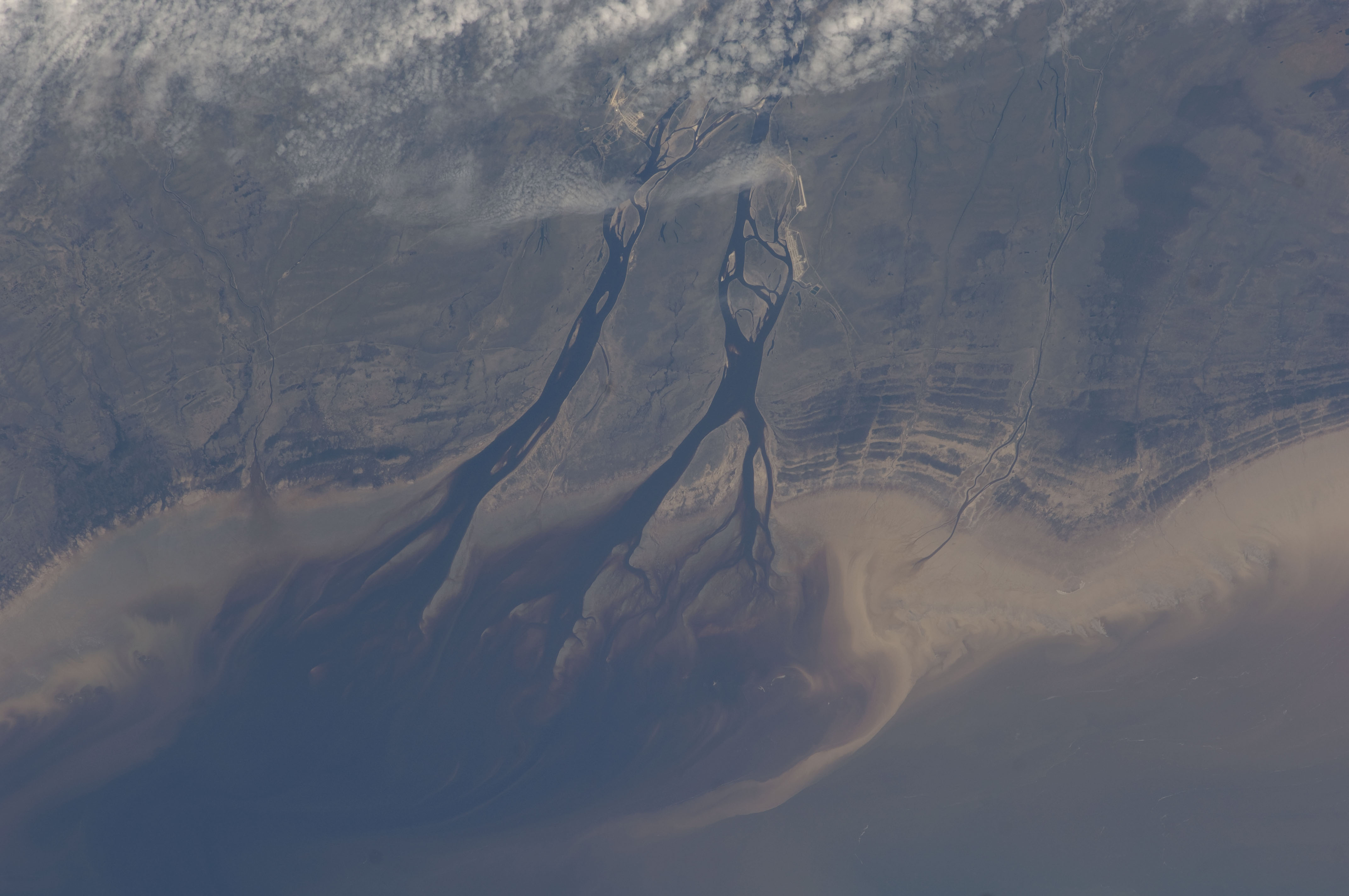
Mouth of the Albany River photographed during ISS Expedition 20 on June 13, 2009. Fort Albany is visible on the south bank of the river (left side) at the top of the photo.

The present-day community of Fort Albany is situated on the south bank of the Albany river, near where it empties into James Bay. The community is made up of three sections: one on the mainland, one on Sinclair Island, and one on Andersen Island. The community also shares the Fort Albany 67 reserve on the north shore of the river with Kashechewan.

Fort Albany has a subarctic climate (Köppen Climate Classification Dfc) with mild summers and severely cold winters. This is characterised by a yearly mean temperature below the freezing point at −2 °C (28 °F). There are very short transitional periods. Fort Albany's climate becomes colder after the bay freezes over. During summer, temperatures reach an average high of 22 °C (71.6 °F). October temperatures are relatively mild, on average six degrees milder than April. The annual precipitation rate averages 569 millimetres (22.4 in), which is noticeably higher in summer than at other times of the year.

Climate data for Fort Albany
Month	Jan	Feb	Mar	Apr	May	Jun	Jul	Aug	Sep	Oct	Nov	Dec	Year
Mean daily maximum °C (°F)	−15 (5)	−11 (12)	−4 (25)	2 (36)	11 (52)	18 (64)	22 (72)	20 (68)	14 (57)	7 (45)	−1 (30)	−10 (14)	4 (40)
Daily mean °C (°F)	−22 (−8)	−19 (−2)	−12 (10)	−3 (27)	5 (41)	11 (52)	15 (59)	14 (57)	9 (48)	3 (37)	−5 (23)	−16 (3)	−2 (29)
Mean daily minimum °C (°F)	−28 (−18)	−27 (−17)	−19 (−2)	−9 (16)	−1 (30)	5 (41)	9 (48)	8 (46)	4 (39)	−1 (30)	−9 (16)	−21 (−6)	−7 (19)
Average precipitation mm (inches)	26 (1.0)	21 (0.8)	18 (0.7)	24 (0.9)	34 (1.3)	82 (3.2)	97 (3.8)	76 (3.0)	74 (2.9)	59 (2.3)	32 (1.3)	28 (1.1)	571 (22.3)

=== Annual break-up ===
A regular occurrence in the climate of the James Bay coast is the annual break-up of ice along the rivers during the spring thaw. The dramatically rising water levels can cause massive flooding in the community, as well as dangerous ice floes floating downriver. During the break-up, the islands are usually disconnected from the mainland. Dangerous levels of flooding have frequently prompted residents to be evacuated in freight canoes or be airlifted to urban centres further inland. In the 1990s, the First Nation built dykes to guard against high waters caused by the break-up. As of 2019, Chief Mike Metatawabin noted that the break-up was almost not noticeable due to the functional dykes, in stark contrast to the frequent disastrous evacuations the thaw caused in neighbouring Kashechewan.

In 2020, Fort Albany and Kashechewan began the "On the Land" program, an initiative to support community members to live on the land during the break-up, in order to wait out the rising waters. This initiative was born out of concerns about air travel arising from the COVID-19 pandemic, and had the added benefit of promoting traditional food harvesting, intergenerational knowledge sharing, and language education.

== Demographics ==
=== Population ===
According to the band council's website, the community has a population of around 1200, while the band consists of approximately 5000 band members, which are shared with Kashechewan First Nation.

=== Language ===
Swampy Cree is the language of the Mushkegowuk. A majority of the residents surveyed for the 2021 Canadian census (420 of 775) reported speaking an Indigenous language to some degree at home, all but 75 of which also spoke English to some degree. 350 residents surveyed reported only speaking English at home.

=== Religion ===
The two main forms of spirituality practised in Fort Albany are Christianity (Roman Catholicism) and Cree spirituality.

== Economy ==
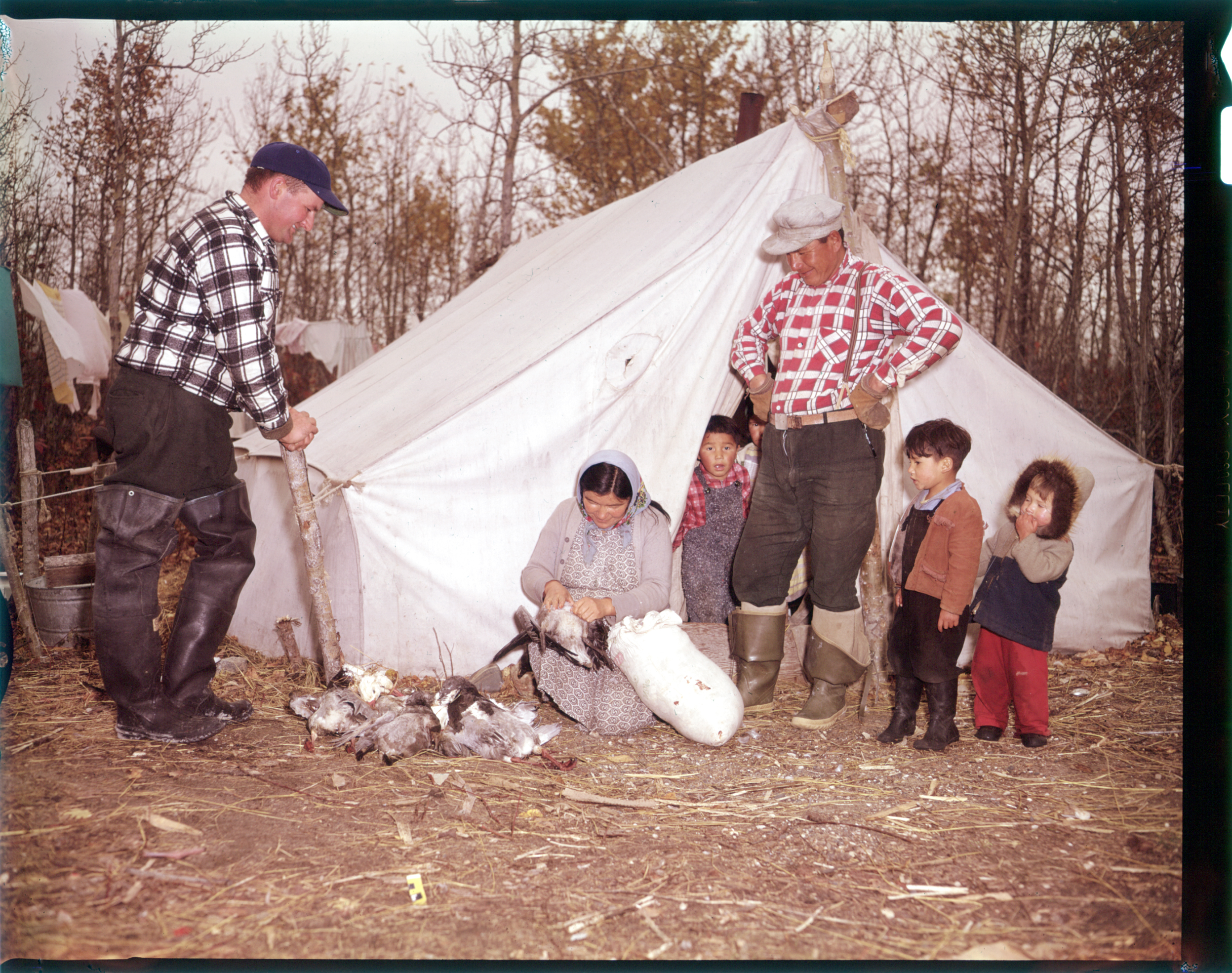
The spring goose hunt is an annual tradition in Fort Albany and Kashechewan

The basic economy of the area is a subsistence allowance. There are seasonal jobs that involve construction work for the major capital projects like the dyke, the new school, and the Mid Canada Line. There are the traditional economic activities like trapping, fishing and hunting. There are a small number of employment opportunities including the Fort Albany First Nation Administration office, Mundo Peetabeck Education authority, Peetabeck Health Services. Fort Albany Power Authority, James Bay General Hospital, Northern Store, Air Creebec, and other small private owned businesses.

== Arts and culture ==
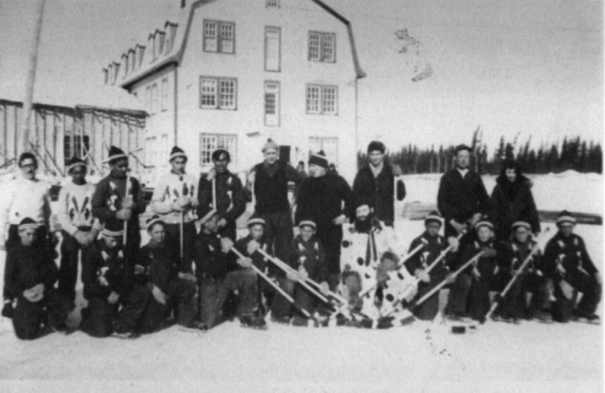
A local hockey team outside St. Anne's Indian Residential School c. 1940. Hockey remains popular in the James Bay Cree communities

From August 4 to 6, 2005, Fort Albany hosted the third annual Creefest (Ininiw Maskoshewin), a Mushkegowuk Council-organized festival celebrating Cree culture.

In 2021, former Chief Mike Metatawabin and Swiss musician Manuel Menrath collaborated on a live online performance of Metatawabin's spoken word set to Menrath's music. The piece was titled "Songs of the Land: A Spoken Word Experience" and included themes of his experience at St. Anne's residential school and the land.

== Government ==
=== Government history ===
Since 1909, an elected band government has been in charge of the reserve. Following the split with Kashechewan in 1977, each community has had its own band council. Fort Albany's electoral system followed the Indian Act until 2022, when a custom election code was put in place.

=== Band council ===
Fort Albany First Nation is governed by a band council, consisting of a chief, deputy chief, and seven councillors, all of whom are elected by members of the community. Since 2022, the government has followed a custom election code, after having used the method laid out in the Indian Act since 1909. The current chiefs and councillors are:

- Chief Elizabeth Kataquapit
- Deputy Chief Terry Metatawabin
- First Councillor Brenda Scott
- Councillor Pascal Spence
- Councillor Joseph Scott
- Councillor Ruby Edward-Wheesk
- Councillor Madeline Scott
- Councillor Christopher Metatawabin
- Councillor Madeline Nakogee

=== Tribal council ===
The nation is part of the Mushkegowuk Council, a council of chiefs for eight Cree nations in Northern Ontario which coordinates the activities of its member nations. The head office of the Council is located in Moose Factory.

=== Nishnawbe Aski Nation ===
Fort Albany is represented by the Nishnawbe Aski Nation (NAN), a political organization that advocates and provides services for 49 First Nations across Treaty 9 and Treaty 5 territory. The NAN's headquarters are located in Thunder Bay.

=== Provincial ===
Fort Albany sits within the provincial electoral district Mushkegowuk—James Bay since its creation in 2018.

Mushkegowuk—James Bay
Assembly	Years	Member	Party
Riding created from Timmins—James Bay
42nd	2018–2022	Guy Bourgouin	New Democratic
43rd	2022–2025	Guy Bourgouin	New Democratic
44th	2025–present	Guy Bourgouin	New Democratic

=== Federal ===
At the federal level, Fort Albany is part of the Kapuskasing—Timmins—Mushkegowuk riding.

Parliament	Years	Member	Party
Timmins—James Bay; Riding created from Cochrane—Superior and Timiskaming—Cochrane
36th	1997–2000	Réginald Bélair	Liberal
37th	2000–2004	Réginald Bélair	Liberal
38th	2004–2006	Charlie Angus	New Democratic
39th	2006–2008	Charlie Angus	New Democratic
40th	2008–2011	Charlie Angus	New Democratic
41st	2011–2015	Charlie Angus	New Democratic
42nd	2015–2019	Charlie Angus	New Democratic
43rd	2019–2021	Charlie Angus	New Democratic
44th	2021–2025	Charlie Angus	New Democratic
Kapuskasing—Timmins—Mushkegowuk
45th	2025–present	Gaétan Malette	Conservative

==== Military ====
The Canadian Armed Forces have a presence in the First Nation through the Fort Albany Canadian Ranger Patrol, part of the 3rd Canadian Ranger Patrol Group. The Fort Albany Patrol launched in January 1995 with 20 Cree Rangers.

== Infrastructure ==
=== Transportation ===
The community of Fort Albany is accessible by air, water, and the winter road. The winter road is used only between January and March. Air Creebec provides Fort Albany with daily passenger flights, with connecting flights to Toronto, Montreal and/or other points of travel. These arrangements are done in Timmins on Air Creebec, Air Canada, Thunder Airlines, or Bearskin Airlines.

Fort Albany is also accessible via the waters of James Bay and the Albany River. Moosonee Transportation Limited provides barge service, carrying supplies at least once or twice each summer by traveling up and down the coast to each community. Freighter canoes can travel from Fort Albany to Calstock and return whenever the water levels are sufficient to make river travel possible.

During the summer months, people use outboard motors and canoes for other activities, such as hunting, trapping, and fishing. During the winter months, skidoos are the main transportation around the community. There are pick-up trucks, vans, and all-terrain vehicles owed by both businesses and individuals.

The winter road was completed in the early spring of 1974. It is also used extensively during the winter months. This road is maintained by contractors. The road links all the surrounding communities, such as Attawapiskat, Moosonee, Moose Factory, and Kashechewan. Feasibility studies have recently been undertaken on construction of a permanent all-season road to the communities. The project, if undertaken, will entail a "coastal road" connecting the four communities with each other, as well as a road to link the coastal road to the provincial highway system at Fraserdale, Kapuskasing or Hearst.

In January 2021, the 311-kilometre James Bay Winter Ice Road was under construction, to connect Attawapiskat, Kashechewan, Fort Albany and Moosonee. It opened some time in winter 2021 and was said to accept loads up to 50,000 kilograms in weight. The road is operated by Kimesskanemenow LP, "a limited partnership between the four communities it connects".

In December 2021, Ontario's ministers for Northern Development and the Environment committed to exploring the idea of creating an all-season road to connect Fort Albany and other western James Bay communities to the rest of the Ontario highway system.

==== Aviation ====
Air Creebec transports passengers and provides freight services through Fort Albany Airport. The present passenger rate is $921.90 for an adult return trip to Timmins. These rates increase on an annual basis. Seat sales are available, which are less expensive than the regular fare price. Air Creebec also provides charter flights when required.

Air Creebec also handles patient transportation up the coastal communities on a daily basis, Mondays to Fridays. These flights are intended only for hospital patients requiring out of the community hospital care. Other private small airlines, like Thunder Air and Wabusk Air, also provide charter services, which sometimes are cheaper than a regular flight on Air Creebec.

=== Healthcare ===
Health care in Fort Albany is provided by a 17-bed Fort Albany Hospital staff 24/7 by nursing staff with consultation by doctors from Weeneebayko Area Health Authority as well as transfers to Timmins and Kingston.

In 1994, a volunteer Emergency Response Team was established to decrease response times for medical emergencies. There was hope that this would lead to a full-scale ambulance service in Fort Albany.

=== Food ===
In 2011, Nishnawbe Aski Nation, Thunder Bay grocer Quality Market, and True North Community Co-operative began a partnership to ship fresh produce to Fort Albany and other James Bay communities during the summer months.

=== Internet ===
As of October 2022, Starlink provided high-speed satellite internet access to Fort Albany.

The Western James Bay Telecom Network is a community-based organization that provides high-speed fibre-optic internet to the communities of the west James Bay coast. The fibre-optic network was constructed in 2009, and launched in February 2010. The network is leased from Five Nations Energy Inc. for a nominal fee, and internet service is provided by Xittel.

As with many other First Nations communities, Facebook provides a key means for community members to communicate with each other.^{:111, 140}

== Education ==
The band runs Peetabeck Education, which administers Peetabeck Academy, a K–12 school. The school building was designed to accommodate 333 students, with "a Day Care, two kindergartens, 11 classrooms and rooms for multi-purpose use, library/resource centre, auditorium/gymnasium, gym support, home economics, industrial arts, science administration, staff, educational storage and health," as well as culturally-motivated external landscaping including a fire pit and large dreamcatcher, according to the architectural firm that designed it. The building also includes a community centre. The school had its grand opening in 2001, at the same time the rectory of the old St. Anne's Indian Residential School burned.
