= Peawanuck Airport =

- IATA: YPO; ICAO: CYPO; WMO: 71434

Summary
- Airport type: Public
- Operator: Government of Ontario
- Location: Peawanuck, Ontario
- Time zone: EST (UTC−05:00)
  - Summer (DST): EDT (UTC−04:00)
- Elevation AMSL: 173 ft / 53 m
- Coordinates: 54°59′17″N 085°26′36″W

Map
- Location in Ontario

Runways
Direction	Length		Surface
Direction	ft	m	Surface
11/29	3,520	1,073	Gravel
- Source: Canada Flight Supplement

Peawanuck Airport (IATA: YPO, ICAO: CYPO) is located adjacent to Peawanuck, Ontario, Canada. The airport succeeded Winisk Airport, located in the abandoned Peawanuck after 1986.

== Airlines and destinations ==
Airlines	Destinations
Air Creebec	Attawapiskat, Fort Albany, Kashechewan, Moosonee, Timmins
Thunder Airlines	Attawapiskat, Fort Albany, Kashechewan, Moosonee, Timmins

Air Creebec and Thunder Air (contractor with ORNGE) offers fixed wing air ambulance transfers to Ontario and Quebec.
