= Fort Albany Airport =

- IATA: YFA; ICAO: CYFA

Summary
- Airport type: Public
- Operator: Government of Ontario
- Serves: Fort Albany First Nation
- Location: Fort Albany 67
- Time zone: EST (UTC−05:00)
  - Summer (DST): EDT (UTC−04:00)
- Elevation AMSL: 47 ft / 14 m
- Coordinates: 52°12′13″N 081°41′45″W

Map
- Location in Ontario

Runways
| Direction | Length | | Surface |
| Direction | ft | m | Surface |
|---|---|---|---|
| 10/28 | 3,601 | 1,098 | Gravel |
- Source: Canada Flight Supplement

Fort Albany Airport (IATA: YFA, ICAO: CYFA) is located adjacent to the Indian reserve, Fort Albany 67 of the Fort Albany First Nation, Ontario, Canada. It has a singular, gravel runway designated runway 10/28 that is 3,601 by 100 ft (1,098 by 30 m). The airport has one passenger terminal capable of accommodating approximately 50 passengers. There is also a cargo facility at the airport.

== Airlines and destinations ==
| Airlines | Destinations |
|---|---|
| Air Creebec | Attawapiskat, Kashechewan, Moosonee, Peawanuck, Timmins |
| Thunder Airlines | Attawapiskat, Kashechewan, Moosonee, Peawanuck, Timmins |

Air Creebec also offers fixed wing air ambulance transfers from the airport to other destinations in Ontario or Quebec.
