= Moosonee Airport =

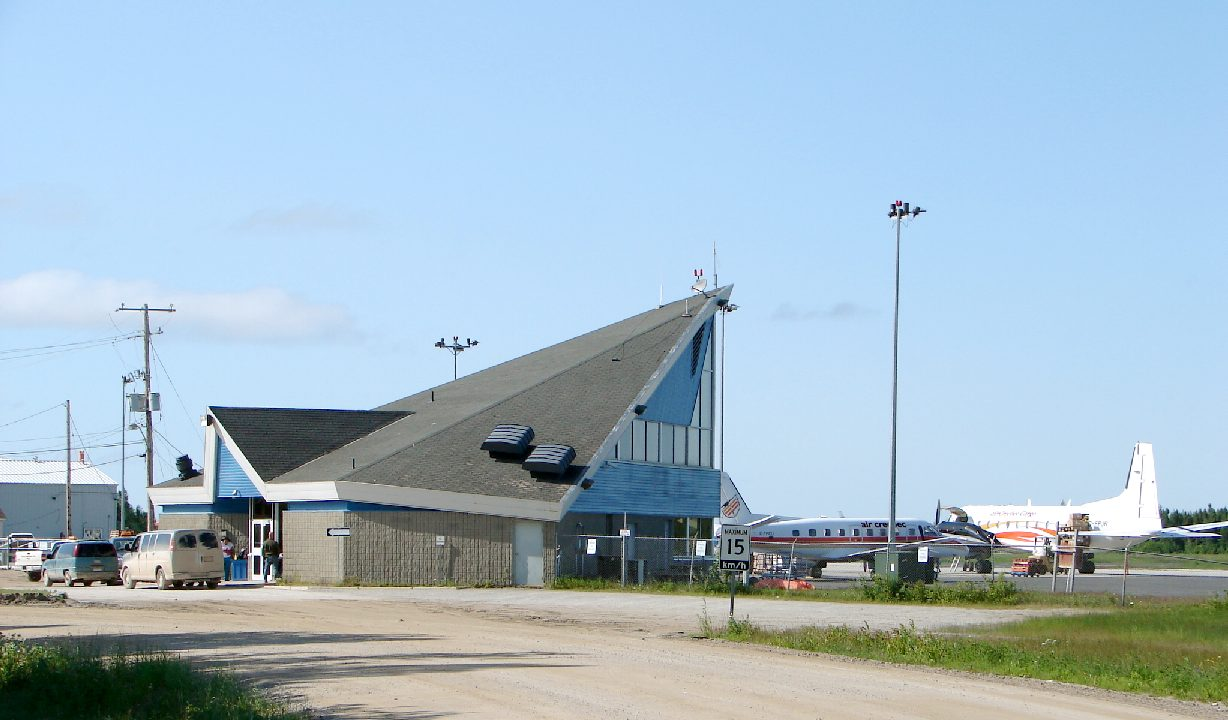
- IATA: YMO; ICAO: CYMO; WMO: 71398

Summary
- Airport type: Public
- Operator: The Corporation of the Town of Moosonee
- Location: Moosonee, Ontario
- Time zone: EST (UTC−05:00)
  - Summer (DST): EDT (UTC−04:00)
- Elevation AMSL: 30 ft (9.1 m)
- Coordinates: 51°17′31″N 080°36′30″W
- Website: www.moosonee.ca/airport/

Map
- Location in Ontario

Runways
Direction	Length		Surface
Direction	ft	m	Surface
06/24	4,000	1,219	Asphalt
14/32	3,591	1,095	Gravel / asphalt

Statistics (2010)
- Aircraft movements: 23,981
- Source: Canada Flight Supplement; Environment Canada; Movements from Statistics Canada

Moosonee Airport (IATA: YMO, ICAO: CYMO) is located 2 nautical miles (3.7 km; 2.3 mi) north-east of Moosonee, Ontario, Canada.

The Moosonee Airport was officially opened in May 1970 and a new terminal building was constructed in July 1991, which houses the airport management office and washrooms. There are several small buildings and hangars at the airport. There are no other facilities at the airport.

The airport handles propeller or turbo prop aircraft only and helicopters from two helipads next to the terminal building.

== Airlines and destinations ==
Airlines	Destinations
Air Creebec	Attawapiskat, Fort Albany, Kashechewan, Peawanuck, Timmins
North Star Air	Attawapiskat, Fort Albany, Kashechewan
Thunder Airlines	Attawapiskat, Fort Albany, Kashechewan, Peawanuck, Timmins

== Tenants ==
- CHC Helicopter and Wabusk Air for ORNGE

== See also ==
- Moosonee Water Aerodrome
