= Kashechewan Airport =

- IATA: ZKE; ICAO: CZKE

Summary
- Airport type: Public
- Operator: Government of Ontario
- Location: Kashechewan First Nation
- Time zone: EST (UTC−05:00)
  - Summer (DST): EDT (UTC−04:00)
- Elevation AMSL: 35 ft (11 m)
- Coordinates: 52°16′57″N 081°40′40″W

Map
- Location in Ontario

Runways
Direction	Length		Surface
Direction	ft	m	Surface
07624	3,903	1,190	Gravel
- Source: Canada Flight Supplement

Kashechewan Airport (IATA: ZKE, ICAO: CZKE) is located 0.7 nautical miles (1.3 km; 0.81 mi) west of the First Nations community of Kashechewan, Ontario, Canada.

Passengers can fly to and from the airport with a scheduled service.

The airport handles turboprop aircraft only.

== Location and Infrastructure ==
Kashechewan Airport is approximately 4 kilometers south of the Kashechewan settlement. It operates at an elevation of 11 meters (35 feet) above sea level and features a single gravel runway, designated 06/24, measuring 1,067 meters (3,500 feet) in length. The airport's infrastructure is designed to accommodate small to medium-sized aircraft, suitable for the needs of the region.

== Services and operations ==
The airport facilitates regular scheduled flights operated by regional carriers, such as Air Creebec and Thunder Airlines, connecting the community to larger cities like Moosonee and Timmins. These flights are essential for delivering supplies, mail, and offering travel options to the residents of Kashechewan. Additionally, the airport is used for medical evacuations and emergency operations.

Airlines	Destinations
Air Creebec	Attawapiskat, Fort Albany, Moosonee, Peawanuck, Timmins
Thunder Airlines	Attawapiskat, Fort Albany, Moosonee, Peawanuck, Timmins
