= Timmins Victor M. Power Airport =

Airport in Ontario, Canada

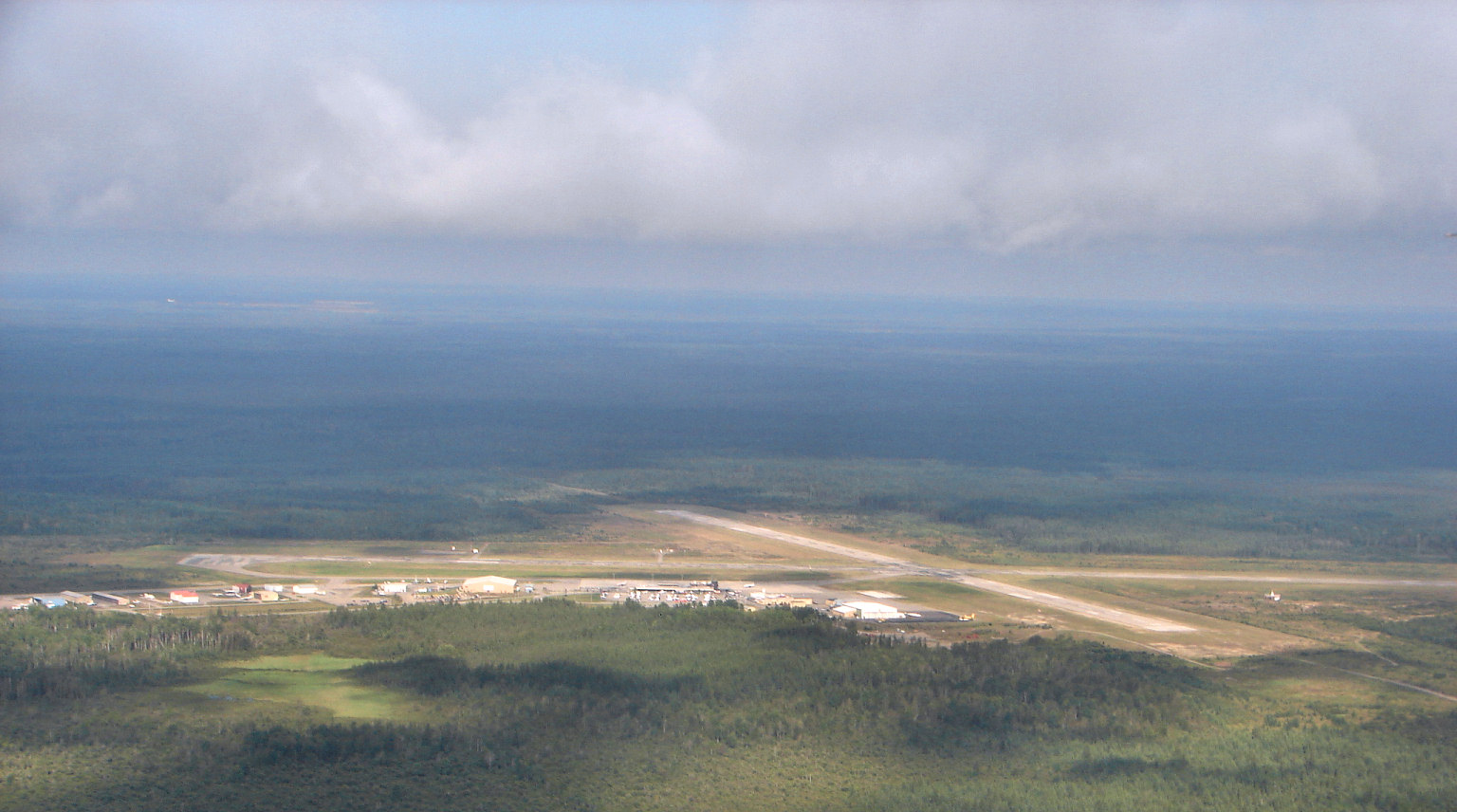
- IATA: YTS; ICAO: CYTS; WMO: 71739

Summary
- Airport type: Public
- Operator: City of Timmins
- Serves: Timmins, Ontario
- Time zone: EST (UTC−05:00)
  - Summer (DST): EDT (UTC−04:00)
- Elevation AMSL: 968 ft / 295 m
- Coordinates: 48°34′09″N 081°22′39″W
- Website: https://www.timmins.ca/our_services/airport

Map
- Location in Ontario CYTS (Canada)

Runways
| Direction | Length | | Surface |
| Direction | ft | m | Surface |
|---|---|---|---|
| 03/21 | 6,001 | 1,829 | Asphalt |
| 10/28 | 4,905 | 1,495 | Asphalt |

Statistics (2010)
- Aircraft movements: 25,318
- Sources: Canada Flight Supplement; Environment Canada; Movements from Statistics Canada

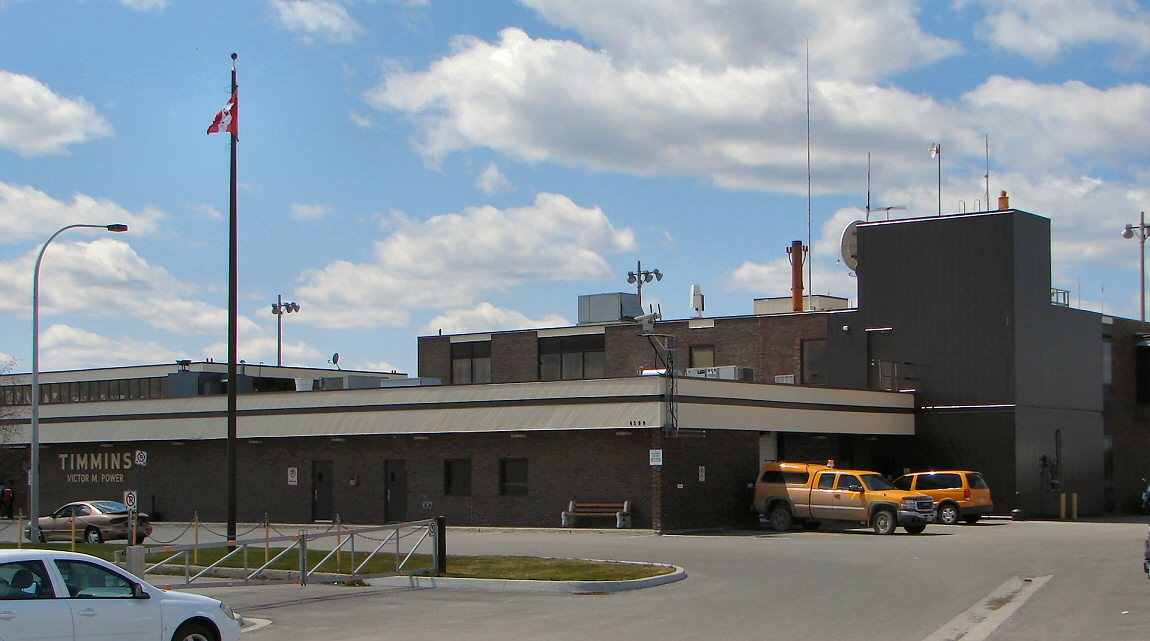
Terminal building

Timmins Victor M. Power Airport (IATA: YTS, ICAO: CYTS) is located 6 nautical miles (11 km; 6.9 mi) north-northwest of Timmins, Ontario, Canada. The airport serves both scheduled passenger and cargo flights and general aviation, including air ambulance (MEDEVAC), forest-fire fighting, and flight training.

Timmins Airport was first opened in 1955 following lobbying by the board of the Timmins Chamber of Commerce. On May 31, 2007, the airport was renamed in honour of the city's former mayor Victor M. Power.

== Airlines and destinations ==
Timmins Airport handles approximately 150,000 passengers per year, and acts as a mini hub with flights to many small communities in north-central Ontario while connecting these communities to Toronto in the south.

| Airlines | Destinations |
|---|---|
| Air Canada Express | Toronto–Pearson |
| Air Creebec | Attawapiskat, Fort Albany, Kashechewan, Moosonee, Peawanuck |
| Porter Airlines | Toronto–Billy Bishop |
| Thunder Airlines | Attawapiskat, Fort Albany, Kashechewan, Moosonee, Peawanuck |

=== Cargo ===
| Airlines | Destinations |
|---|---|
| FedEx Express | Sudbury, Toronto–Pearson |

== Other tenants ==
- Ontario Ministry of Natural Resources - aerial firefighting unit
- Ornge - air ambulance
- Budget Car Rental - kiosk inside terminal
- Boogys Diner - inside terminal
- Timmins Ultra-Light School
- Maintair Aviation Services - ground handling services

== Timmins Flight Service Station ==
Timmins Airport is serviced by a flight service station which also provides Remote Airport Advisory Service (RAAS) for the Moosonee (CYMO) and Muskoka (CYQA) airports.

== Accidents and incidents ==
- On 9 November 1969, Douglas C-47B CF-AAL of Austin Airways crashed on approach, killing two of the four people on board. The aircraft was operating a domestic flight from Winisk, Ontario.

== See also ==
- Timmins/Porcupine Lake Water Aerodrome
