= St. Anne's Indian Residential School =

Defunct Canadian residential school

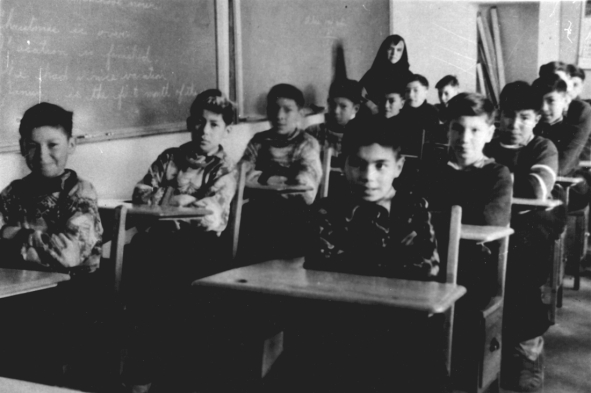
- A classroom in St. Anne's circa 1945
- Fort Albany, Ontario; Canada

Information
- Type: Residential school
- Religious affiliation: Roman Catholic Church
- Established: 1902
- Founder: Oblates of Mary Immaculate, Grey Nuns of Montreal
- Closed: 1976

St. Anne’s Indian Residential School was a Canadian Indian residential school in Fort Albany, Ontario that operated from 1902 to 1976. It took Cree students from the Fort Albany First Nation and surrounding area. Many students reported physical, psychological and sexual abuse, and 156 former students settled a lawsuit against the Government of Canada in 2004.

== History ==
The school opened in 1902 under the direction of the Oblates of Mary Immaculate and the Grey Nuns of Montreal (also known as the Sisters of Charity), and began receiving financial support from the federal government in 1906. Originally located at the Fort Albany Mission on Albany Island, Ontario, in the James Bay Treaty region, the school relocated to the north shore of the banks of the Albany River in 1932. The school burned down in 1939 and was subsequently rebuilt.

Students who attended the school were from surrounding First Nations communities, including Fort Albany, Attawapiskat First Nation, Weenusk First Nation, Constance Lake First Nation, Moose Fort and Fort Severn First Nation.

In 2015, the rectory of the school was burnt to the ground. At the time, there were plans to search the grounds for the remains of children recorded as missing from the school. The St. Anne's Indian Residential School Survivors Project was established in 2020 to plan a search for possible burial sites, spearheaded by Fort Albany in collaboration with nearby communities.

== Abuse and lawsuit ==
Many former students of St. Anne's describe experiencing physical, psychological and sexual abuse while at the school. Physical abuse came in many different forms including poor living conditions and corporal punishments for students speaking in their native languages. According to St. Anne's survivor Edmund Metatawabin, the school used an improvised electric chair "for punishment and sport" in the book Up Ghost River. The electric chair was used from the mid-1950s through the mid-1960s according to police testimony. Psychological abuse began with the act of taking the students who were small children away from their families. This abuse allegedly continued within the school. Many residential school survivors also were victims of sexual abuse in various forms. Many have come forward stating they were sexually assaulted while attending the school.

An Ontario Provincial Police (OPP) investigation conducted between 1992 and 1998 interviewed 700 victims and witnesses about physical assaults, sexual assaults, suspicious deaths and other abuses alleged to have occurred at the school between 1941 and 1972. From a total of 74 suspects, seven people were charged and five were convicted. 156 former students who were physically or sexually abused at St. Anne’s sued the federal government. A financial settlement was reached in 2004 – two years before the Indian Residential Schools Settlement Agreement (IRSSA) was signed to compensate survivors of the schools. St. Anne's residential school survivors sought to have access to the OPP discovery documents for use in substantiating claims in the IRSSA process, however the federal government refused to release the documents and in 2018 survivors lost what may have been their final appeal.

In 2014, the Ontario Supreme Court ruled that the records were to be released, but by that time, over 12,000 documents had already been noticeably redacted. The documents that had been redacted have yet to be released in full, which has raised questions about the content of the redacted text. By 2020, the Canadian government had spent CA$3.2 million ($3,231,000) in legal fees against the survivors of St. Anne's residential school.

On November 2, 2020, the Court of Appeal ruled that the case concerning whether the Canadian government was trying to hide the sexual and physical abuse that occurred at St. Anne’s Indian Residential School would stay in Ontario. The decision was made by Justices Michael Fairburn, Paul Rouleau and Bradley Miller and overturned a ruling from June 2020 made by Paul Perell of the Superior Court of Justice, who ruled that the case should be heard in British Columbia due to the IRSSA.

The lasting impacts of residential schools also includes post traumatic stress disorder and a heightened rate of disability among Indigenous peoples compared to non-Indigenous peoples. Abuse suffered in residential schools continue to impact the mental health of Indigenous communities. Indigenous peoples also experience a heightened rate of disability due to heightened “rates of injury, accident, violence, self-destructive or suicidal behaviour and illness.” These heightened statistics are a result of the negative health impacts of residential schools for the survivors and the subsequent generations in the family. Another lasting impact from St. Anne's Residential School is the re-victimization that was a result of the decade-long court battle, where survivors claims were hidden and their voices silenced.

== OPP charges and convictions ==
Francoise Seguin was a nun with the Sisters of Charity of Ottawa that worked at St. Anne's between 1958 and 1968. Seguin's name appeared among other alleged perpetrators of abuse in the 1994 OPP probe into the school, as well as a document filed in 2003 with Ontario's Supreme Court. In 2023, the OPP charged a 97-year old Seguin with three counts of gross indecency, referring to alleged abuse at St. Anne's, Bishop Belleau School in Moosonee and a Sudbury detention centre.

Ann Wesley, born in the Attawapiskat First Nation, was a Cree nun who attended St. Anne's as a child. She was convicted of three counts of common assault, three counts of administering a noxious substance, and one count of assault causing bodily harm. She received an eleven-month conditional sentence.

Jane Kakaychawan, born in Ogoki Post, Ontario, was an Ojibwe nun who attended McIntosh Indian Residential School as a child. She was convicted of three counts of assault causing bodily harm and given a six-month conditional sentence.

John Moses Rodrique was employed by Indian Affairs and pleaded guilty to five counts of indecent assault. He was sentenced to 18 months in jail.

Claude Lambert worked at St. Anne's as a child care worker. She pleaded guilty to one count of indecent assault and was sentenced to eight months in jail.

Marcel Blais was part of the kitchen staff at St. Anne's. He pleaded guilty to one count of indecent assault on a male and did not receive jail time.
