= Thunder Airlines =

Canadian airline

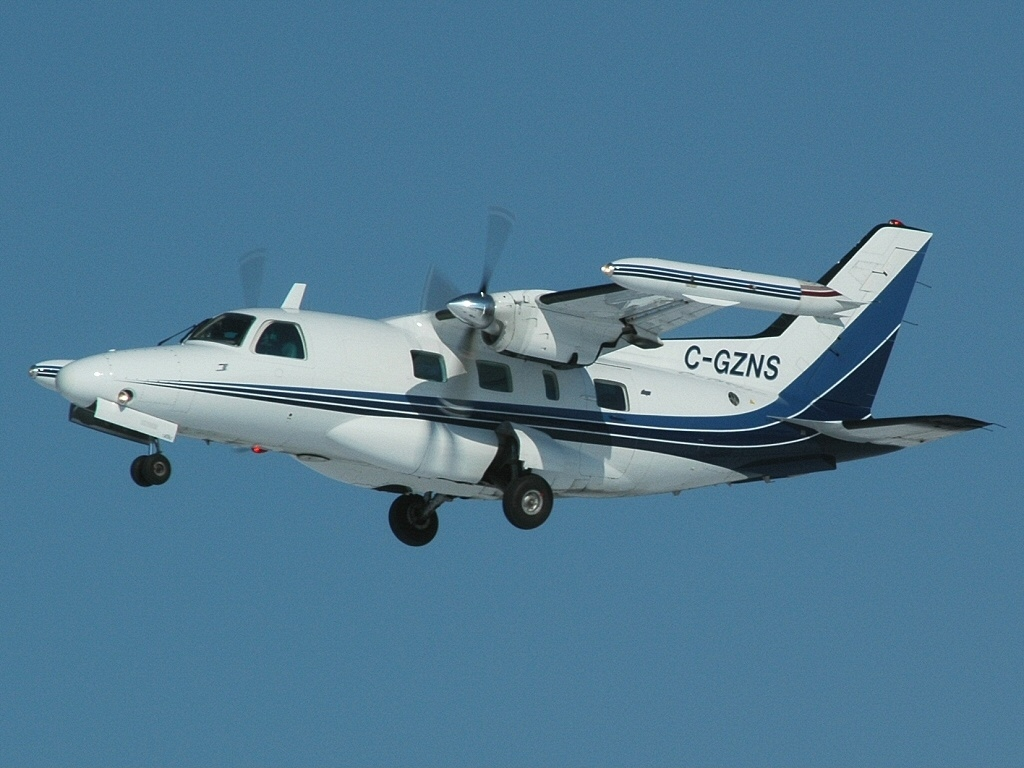
- Thunder Airlines Mitsubishi MU-2
| IATA | ICAO | Call sign |
|---|---|---|
| - | THU | AIR THUNDER |
- Founded: 1994
- AOC #: 8882
- Hubs: Thunder Bay Airport
- Focus cities: Thunder Bay, Timmins, Moosonee, Kashechewan, Fort Albany, Attawapiskat, Peawanuck
- Fleet size: 14
- Destinations: 6
- Headquarters: Thunder Bay, Ontario
- Key people: Christa Calabrese, President
- Website: www.thunderair.com

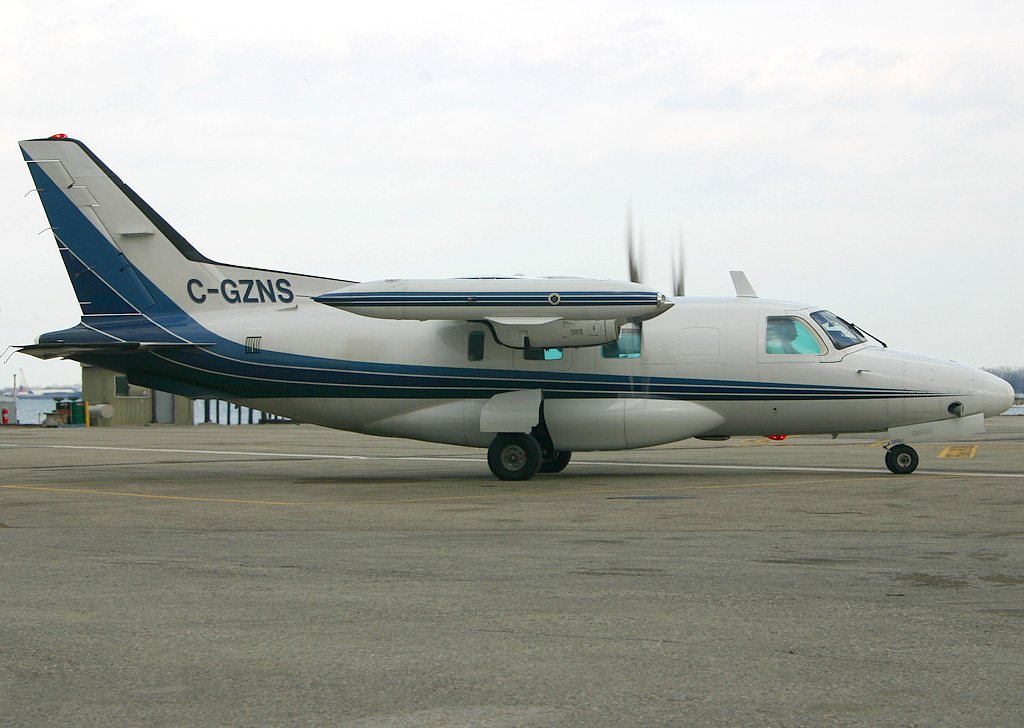
A Mitsubishi MU-2B of Thunder Airlines taxiing at the Toronto City Centre Airport

The former logo of the company.

Thunder Airlines is a Canadian scheduled flight, charter and medevac airline based in Thunder Bay, Ontario. It offers an on-demand charter service from bases in Thunder Bay and Timmins. The company was founded in 1994 and operates fourteen aircraft and flies to six destinations regularly.

== Destinations ==
Thunder Airlines operates scheduled services to the following destinations in Ontario:

- Attawapiskat First Nation (Attawapiskat Airport)
- Fort Albany First Nation (Fort Albany Airport)
- Kashechewan First Nation (Kashechewan Airport)
- Moosonee (Moosonee Airport)
- Timmins (Timmins/Victor M. Power Airport)
- Peawanuck (Peawanuck Airport)

== Fleet ==
As of August 2019 Thunder Airlines website and Transport Canada list the following aircraft:

Thunder Airlines fleet
| Aircraft | No. of aircraft | Variants | Notes |
|---|---|---|---|
| Beechcraft King Air | 7 | 100 series | Seats up to nine and cruises at 385 km/h (208 kn; 239 mph) |
| Cessna 208 Caravan | 1 | 208B Grand Caravan | Seats up to nine, cruises at 270 km/h (150 kn; 170 mph), used mainly for cargo |
| Mitsubishi MU-2 | 6 | Marquise (MU-2B-60) | Seats up to seven, cruises at 500 km/h (270 kn; 310 mph), used mainly for MEDEVAC |

The Transport Canada site lists:

- 1 - Mitsubishi MU-2L (MU-2B-36)
- 1 - Mitsubishi MU-2N (MU-2B-36A)
- 1 - Marquise (MU-2B-60) all with cancelled certificates.

== Accidents and incidents ==
- On November 27, 2023, a MEDEVAC flight flown on a Mitsubishi MU-2 crashed upon landing at Wawa Airport, destroying the plane. No injuries were reported, but the runway was closed for over 2 days.
