= Ornge =

Non-profit charitable air ambulance service

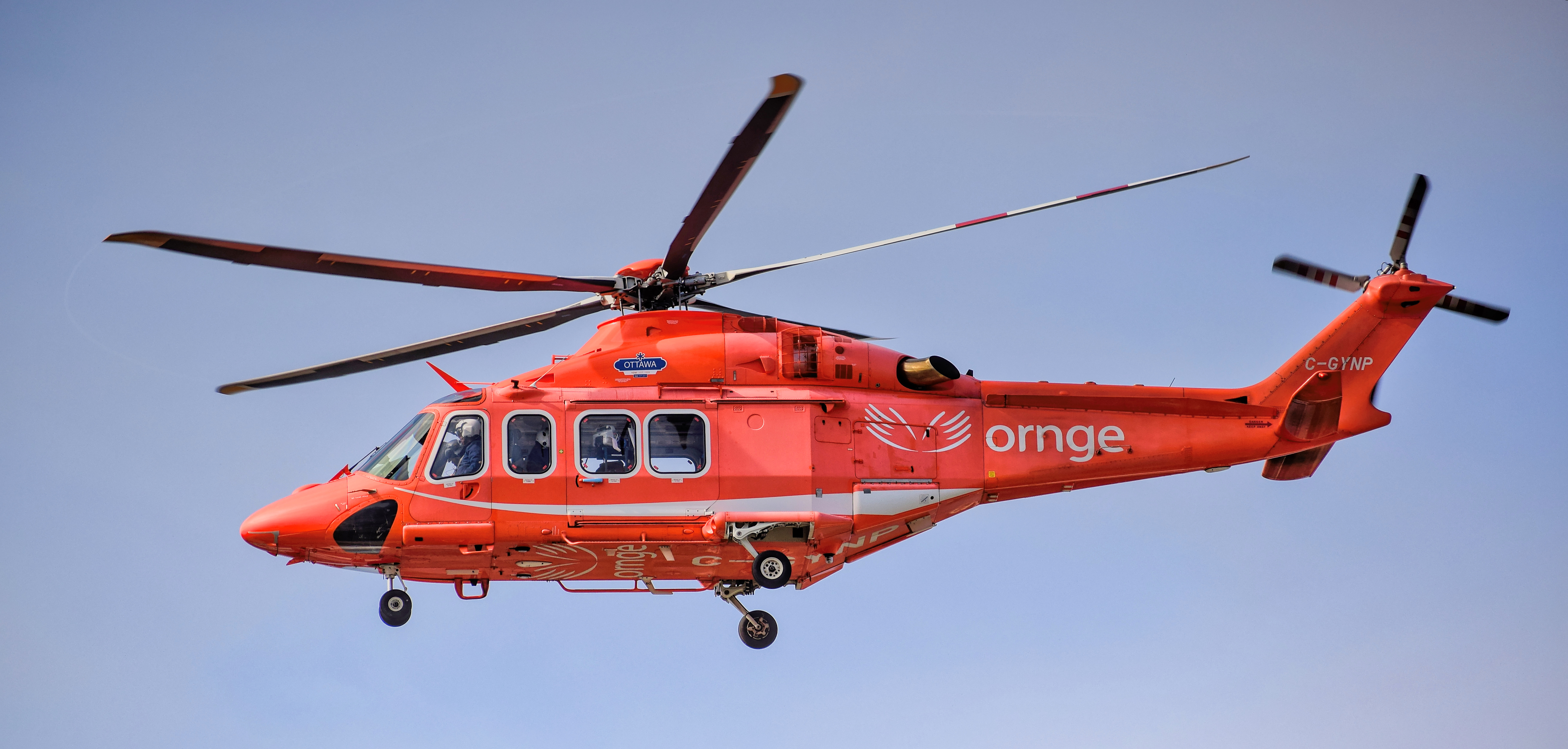
- Ornge AgustaWestland AW139 departing from the Grand River Hospital helipad
- Type: Charitable organization
- Registration no.: 864390232 RR0001
- Legal status: Not-for-profit corporation
- Headquarters: 5310 Explorer Drive; Mississauga, Ontario
- Region served: Ontario
- Services: Air ambulance Land ambulance
- President: Homer Tien
- Revenue: $178,512,783 (2015)
- Expenses: $174,527,588 (2015)
- Staff: 512 (2015)
- Website: www.ornge.ca
- Formerly called: Ontario Air Ambulance Corporation (2005–2007); Ontario Air Ambulance Service (1977–2005)

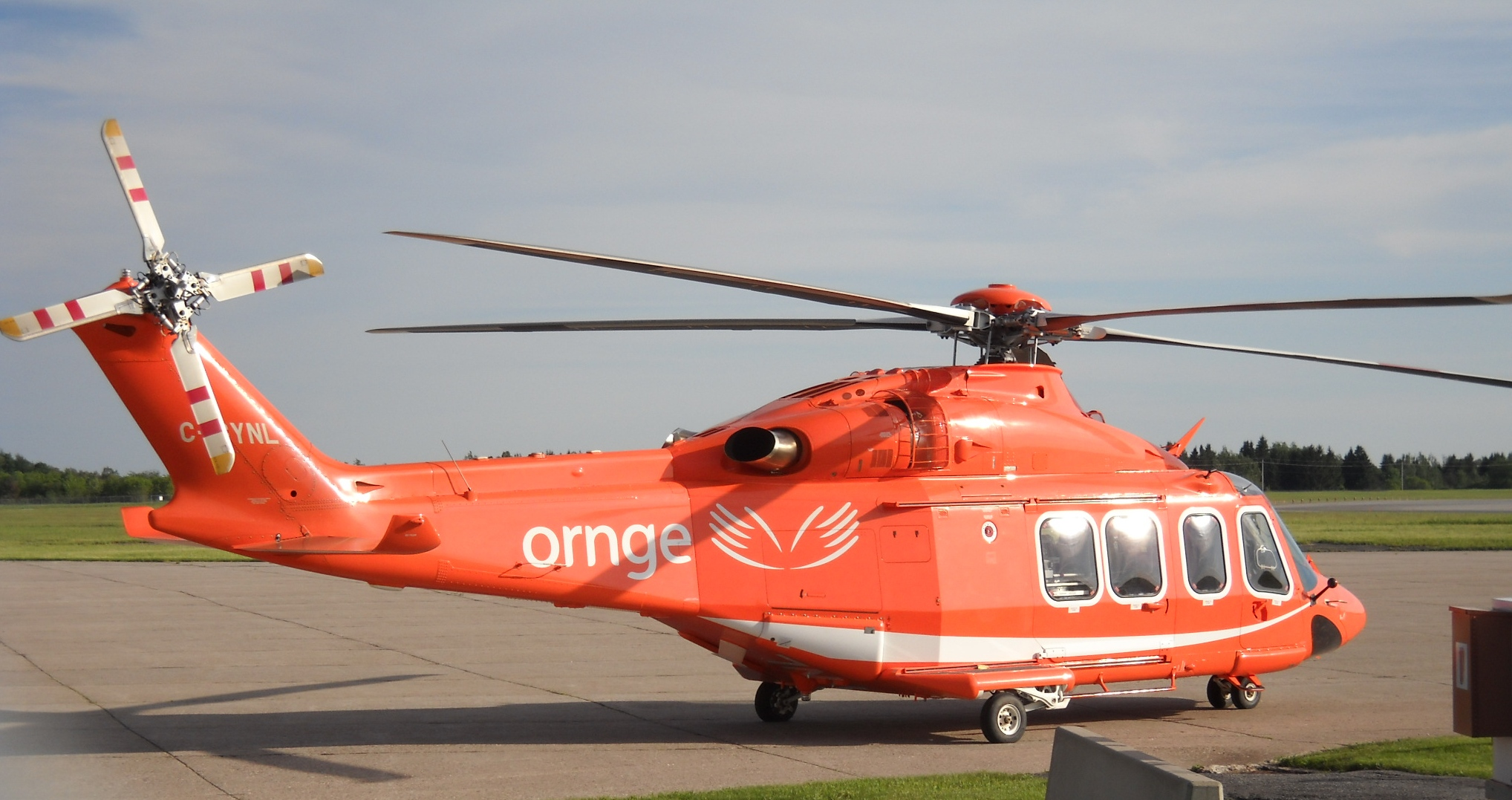
Ornge AgustaWestland AW139 at the Ottawa base, 3 June 2011

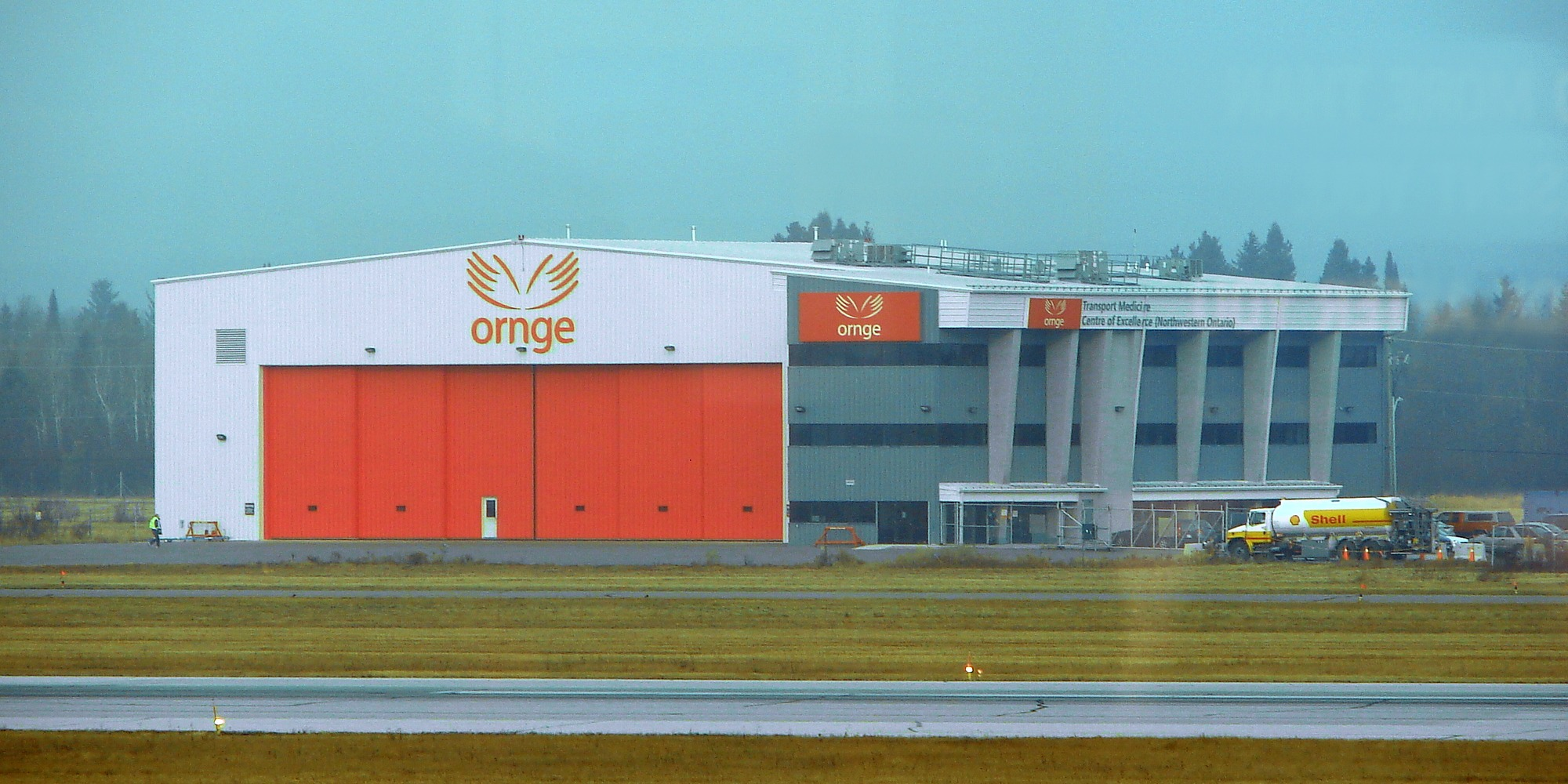
Ornge facility in Thunder Bay

Ornge (pronounced Orange), formerly Ontario Air Ambulance Corporation and Ontario Air Ambulance Service, is a Canadian not-for-profit corporation and registered charity that provides air ambulance and associated ground transportation services for the province of Ontario, under the direction of the province's Ministry of Health. The provision of ambulance services in Ontario is governed by the Ambulance Act, which states that the Minister of Health "has the duty and the power" to make sure Ontario is serviced by a "balanced and integrated system of ambulance services and communication services used in dispatching ambulances." Its headquarters are in Mississauga, Ontario, Canada.

The name Ornge is not an acronym, but is based on the orange colour of the organization's aircraft and land ambulances. According to the organization, "The 'a' was removed from the name, partly to make people stop and take a second look, and also so that it could be trademarked."

As of 2024, Ornge has the largest air ambulance and critical care land ambulance fleet in Canada, and employs more than 700 people, including paramedics, pilots, and aviation specialists. It serves more than 14 million people over one million square kilometres of land, deploying from 14 bases across Ontario as well as its Mississauga, Ontario, Canada headquarters. Ornge is responsible for approximately 20,000 patient-related transports per year. It also contracts some of its non-urgent patient transport service in Northern Ontario to private air carriers.

== History ==
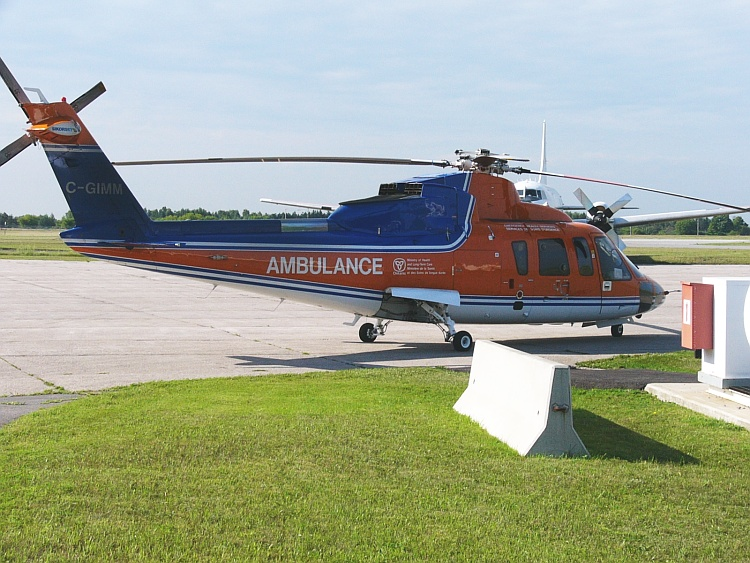
An early production Sikorsky S-76A owned by Canadian Helicopters and used in the Ontario air ambulance role in August 2007. The aircraft is in an earlier Ontario Air Ambulance paint scheme.

Prior to Ornge, the air ambulance program was established in 1977 to serve remote areas, primarily in Northern Ontario, that are inaccessible to land ambulances or that land ambulances would take too long to reach. Ontario was the first Canadian province to provide a helicopter-based air ambulance system to transport critically ill patients to hospital. Air ambulances are also used to transport medical teams and organs for transplant. A large part of the air ambulance service is involved in serving aboriginal communities, of which there are approximately 117, in 6 treaty areas of Northern Ontario.

The first air ambulance, "Bandage One" a Bell 212, was operated out of Buttonville Airport by private operator Viking Helicopters Incorporated (later to become part of Canadian Helicopters). A second Bell 212, "Bandage Two", was after one year pilot deemed successful and located in Sudbury, Ontario, followed by "Bandage Three" in Thunder Bay, "Bandage Four" in Timmins and "Bandage Five" in Sioux Lookout for a total of 5 by 1981. Fixed-wing service began in 1978, provided by Austin Airways, with a Timmins based Cessna Citation I. Eventually almost 90 private aircraft would be employed.

This arrangement lasted more than 25 years, until about 2005, as the Ministry of Health and Long-Term Care contracted with private operators to provide its air ambulance program's aircraft, pilots and paramedics. The Ministry directly operated the central air ambulance dispatch centre and was responsible for overseeing the overall effectiveness of the air ambulance program.

In 2005, the Ministry announced that it was appointing a not-for-profit corporation called the Ontario Air Ambulance Corporation to be responsible for all air ambulance operations. This was done to establish clearer lines of authority among the different parts of air ambulance operations. An arm's-length corporation was also consistent with the Ministry's objective of moving away from direct service delivery. The corporation's name was subsequently changed to Ornge. Ornge was described in 2012 as being neither a Crown corporation nor an agency directly controlled by the Government of Ontario, but rather a non-profit organisation incorporated under the federal Canada Corporations Act.

The Ministry operated an air ambulance dispatch centre in Toronto until Ornge took over and MATC (Medical Air Transport Centre) became the Ornge Communications Centre.

On 17 September 2007, Ornge Air was created. It would purchase aircraft and compete with the private-sector providers. Today, the air ambulance program has become an integral component of the larger emergency health system in communities across the province.

In 2020, Dr. Homer Tien was appointed President and CEO, replacing Dr. Andrew McCallum (2013-2020). From 2015 to 2020, Dr. Tien served as Chief Medical Officer for Ornge, during which time, Ornge became the first air ambulance service to achieve accreditation in Ontario through Accreditation Canada, a third-party healthcare accreditation body.

In 2023, the Government of Ontario announced it would fund the renewal of Ornge Air Ambulance’s fixed wing fleet with a new fleet of aircraft. During this announcement, the Ministry of Health also pledged an additional $10 million to facilitate the procurement of a larger hangar for their Sudbury base to accommodate the expanded fixed wing fleet (in addition to their existing helicopter fleet). The Ontario Ministry of Health said that this $108 million investment will allow Ornge to provide safe and consistent air ambulance services to all Ontarians, especially in rural and remote areas of the province. By 2026, Ornge air ambulance service will have upgraded its existing fleet of eight fixed wing aircraft and will add four additional aircraft in Northeastern Ontario, adding two new 24/7 Critical Care crews to provide service in the region.

== COVID-19 ==
=== Operation Remote Immunity ===
Ornge provided logistical and operational leadership for Operation Remote Immunity, a public health initiative launched on February 1, 2021, in response to the COVID-19 pandemic. This operation aimed to deliver COVID-19 vaccines to residents of remote Indigenous communities in Northern Ontario, which faced heightened vulnerability to the virus due to factors like overcrowded housing, limited healthcare access, and the remoteness of the areas.

Operation Remote Immunity was co-led by Ornge in collaboration with Ontario’s vaccine task force, Indigenous leaders, Indigenous organizations including the Nishnawbe Aski Nation and the Weeneebayko Area Health Authority, and local health units and authorities. Teams of healthcare professionals were trained before deploying to ensure that members were prepared to work respectfully and effectively within Indigenous communities. Indigenous leaders were directly involved in the planning and execution of the vaccination campaign to ensure that it aligned with community needs and values.

Operation Remote Immunity deployed over 800 missions, reaching 31 fly-in First Nations communities and the town of Moosonee. By April 2021, nearly 25,000 doses of the Moderna COVID-19 vaccine had been administered, with approximately 14,000 people receiving their first dose and over 11,000 receiving their second dose. Over 90% of eligible individuals were vaccinated as a result of Operation Remote Immunity. Ornge also provided leadership for Operation Remote Immunity 2.0 which delivered the vaccine to young people aged 12 to 17.

=== ICU Transports ===
During the COVID-19 pandemic, Ornge had a leading role in the transport and care of intensive care unit (ICU) patients across Ontario. Specifically, Ornge assisted hospitals in managing patient capacity during COVID-19 by 'decanting' patients, which refers to the process of moving critically ill patients from one hospital's ICU to another hospital with more available capacity. This was done to alleviate overcrowding in overwhelmed ICUs by redistributing patients to less burdened facilities. The practice became common during the COVID-19 pandemic, as surges in ICU admissions, especially among ventilated COVID-19 patients, led to capacity issues in certain hospitals. This practice ensured that hospitals with stretched resources could maintain the ability to care for incoming critically ill patients.

In 2020 and 2021, Ornge experienced a significant increase in demand for its services as hospitals faced capacity challenges. Patients were transported as far as 110 kilometers from Toronto to other hospitals, including in locations such as Barrie and Kingston. During a COVID-19 wave of infections between November 2020 and January 2021, Ornge transferred approximately 240 ICU patients, representing a 60% increase from the previous year. Many of these patients were COVID-19 positive or exhibited symptoms, and most were sedated and on ventilators.

== Financial scandal and police investigation ==
=== Executive compensation ===
In 2011 Ornge was involved in a controversy regarding executives' compensation, including President and CEO Chris Mazza. The Toronto Star uncovered that Mazza was receiving $1.4 million a year while remaining off the "sunshine list" of public employees earning over $100,000. That salary made him the highest publicly paid official in the province. Ontario Health Minister Deb Matthews stated that Mazza's salary was "outrageous, shocking and unacceptable". On 9 February 2013 Dr. Chris Mazza received $4.6 million in public dollars in his last two years at Ornge, including salary, bonuses, cash advances and two housing loans. In 2013, it was revealed that Mazza made $9.3 million over six years at Ornge. Mazza expensed ski trips and international junkets, often with his girlfriend; hotel room bills of $2,400 were reported.

Other executives were "highly paid", but Ornge failed to disclose their salaries. Chairman Rainer Beltzner received $232,757 in 2011. The board members received almost $2 million between 2007 and 2011. In 2011, 50 executives received a total of $11.8 million (average $238,000) which was not disclosed on the Sunshine list.

Executives were granted company-paid executive MBA educations, at a total of $600,000. Kelly Long, Mazza's girlfriend and an ORNGE vice-president, received an MBA from Western University in London.

Mazza went on an indefinite medical leave on 22 December 2011 at the height of the scandal.

=== Kickback allegations ===
After Ornge bought helicopters from AgustaWestland for $144 million, AgustaWestland then made a $4.7 million payment to Mazza-controlled ORNGE Global. A later additional payment of $2 million was promised. Allegedly, the payment was for "marketing services". It was found that this "consisted of a small binder of information pulled together by Long." Subsequent Ornge leader Ron McKerlie said the two small binders do not justify the large payment. The binders are said to be in the possession of the OPP.

Later, a former executive indicated that Ornge had paid AgustaWestland $7 million more than should have. It was this allegation that prompted the OPP investigation. Tom Rothfels indicated that Mazza insisted on paying about $600,000 extra per helicopter (roughly $7 million). Rick Potter, former COO, indicated about $10 million extra.

AgustaWestland also agreed to donate US$2.9 million to Ornge's charitable foundation.

=== Inappropriate purchases ===
Ornge paid $28 million for 11 used helicopters, believing this to be cheaper than renting. The fleet was subsequently sold for less than $8 million.

Ornge purchased 12 helicopters from AgustaWestland, although only 9 were required. Two of the units were not equipped to carry patients; these were sold in 2013. The remaining 10 were found to have a poor cabin layout which made CPR difficult. In 2015, Ornge was looking at replacing the AW139s, citing complexity and fuel consumption concerns.

Ornge purchased 10 Pilatus PC-12 airplanes, although only 6 were needed. Two of the 10 were for sale in 2015.

The auditor general noted that "an open public competitive tender was not used" and Ornge overbought.

Ornge planned a "Transport Medicine Centre of Excellence" in Hamilton. Ornge spent approximately $600,000 leasing hangar space that went unused, due to construction delays. Approximately $1.9 million was spent on hangar renovations. The move from Toronto to Hamilton was later cancelled.

Questions arose about the decision to open a base in Oshawa. Rick Potter, aviation chief (COO Ornge Air), stated the site does not have an instrument landing system, has many noise complaints and was not one he would recommend. Hangar space was purchased in 2011, then subsequently sold for a $130,000 loss when plans were cancelled in 2013.

Ornge purchased lifting devices, dubbed Ornge pickers, that were to lift patients into aircraft. The devices never worked. There were also issues with the de-icing system for the AW139s, which never worked. The company also apparently spent on orange painted tractors to move aircraft.

=== Operational issues ===
Various cases of delays in moving patients were revealed. It was found that dispatch operators were under pressure to cut costs by reducing helicopter launches. A policy existed that a helicopter would not be dispatched until a land ambulance had confirmed the need. The policy was changed in 2012 to immediate launch when the 911 centre requests it.

It was reported that the helicopter based in Thunder Bay was unable to fly about one quarter of the time due to lack of paramedics. The Star found the helicopter grounded 237 times for a total of 1300 hours over 10 months. "It's also a waste of public money. You have a helicopter and two pilots sitting there unable to do their jobs," stated a paramedic union leader.

=== Web of companies ===
Critics charged that Ornge had created a "web" of companies. The auditor general found at least 14(20 by another source) different corporate entities, among them JSmarts, Ornge Peel (later Ornge Global), Ornge Global Real Estate, Ornge Global Holdings LP, Ornge Issuer Trust, Ornge Global Air, Ornge Global Management and Orgeco. Some of these companies were for-profit. The auditor general was denied access to financial records, given some of the entities are privately held. The structure was described as a "complicated network". "In fact, much of Ornge's operation is being delivered by these other entities, which bill Ornge for those services."

Auditor General Jim McCarter described Ornge as a "mini-conglomerate" and believed the audit might not have found all the corporate offshoots.

It was found that taxpayer dollars had flowed to for-profit Ornge companies.

Some of the companies were owned by Chris Mazza, other executives, and board members.

=== Corporate offices ===
The building for Ornge's head office was bought for $15 million, using borrowed money. Ornge then created a complex deal with other Ornge companies to sell the building and lease it back to itself. An independent real-estate appraiser estimated that Ornge's rent was 40% higher than the fair-market rent. This amounted to a $2 million overpayment in five years. This allowed Ornge Global Real Estate to obtain $24 million in financing. The "extra" $9 million flowed to another company, Ornge Global Holdings LP. The OPP was to look into the missing $9 million. Auditor General Jim McCarter said this deal was one of several that did not "pass the old smell test". Ornge's 25-year lease agreement was unusually long.

The building itself was dubbed the "Crystal Palace" for its opulence and recreational facilities. Nearly $500,000 was spent on renovations. Ornge also apparently paid to renovate its previous office space, then paid $760,000 extra to break the lease early.

=== Legal fees ===
From 2005 to 2012, Ornge paid "well connected" law firm Fasken Martineau over $9 million in legal fees for 22,000 hours of work, including organizing the for-profit companies. Other law firms received a further $2 million. Much of the money was spent creating the "web" of companies.

Alf Apps, former president of the Liberal Party national organization, was a Fasken lawyer. Apps boasted of the success of the deal structure. Integrity Commissioner Lynn Morrison indicated she believed Apps had lobbied the government without registering. Apps denied the allegation in testimony before legislative committee. Apps resigned from FM in Feb 2012, moving to another firm.

Don Guy, chair of three campaigns for Dalton McGuinty, billed FM over $100,000 in legal fees.

Lynne Golding, a Fasken partner (married to Tony Clement), helped craft the 2005 performance agreement. She testified that she thought the agreement gave the government strong powers over Ornge, contradicting minister Deb Mathews. Guy Giorno, a Fasken lawyer and ex chief of staff to Mike Harris and Stephen Harper, advised Ornge on compliance and disclosure.

=== Chronology ===
Ornge Global, Ornge's for-profit division, also received $6.7 million in a contract from Anglo-Italian helicopter manufacturer AgustaWestland, which is also part of the audit by the provincial auditor general. Ron McKerlie, who was at the time Deputy Minister for the Ministry of Government Services, Associate Secretary of Cabinet and Secretary of Management Board of Cabinet for the Government of Ontario, was appointed as the Interim President and CEO.

As the scandal spread on 24 January 2012 Ornge fired 18 managers and closed the J Smarts charity program. The next day a new board of directors was named, including former provincial cabinet minister Charles Harnick. A complete forensic audit was also started. On 2 February 2012 Ornge President and CEO Chris Mazza was fired without compensation, as was the chief operating officer of ORNGE Global, Maria Renzella. ORNGE Global GP Inc. and ORNGE Global Holdings LP were placed in bankruptcy under the oversight of a trustee. The bankruptcy move does not affect the provincial air ambulance service, which is operated separately.

On 2 February 2012, the Ontario Health Minister Deb Mathews stated, "Today, the for-profit ORNGE Global GP Inc. and ORNGE Global Holdings LP went into receivership, essentially ending their existence. As a result, Dr. Chris Mazza, president and CEO, and Maria Renzella, chief operating officer, have been terminated and ORNGE has advised us that no severance has been offered. These are vitally important and necessary steps needed to restore the confidence of Ontarians in the leadership team responsible for Ontario's air ambulance service. The forensic audit continues and we look forward to their findings and the auditor general's value-for-money audit. We continue to seek and support the changes at ORNGE and continue to work with the new leadership as they strengthen Ontario's air ambulance service."

On 16 February 2012 Ornge became the subject of an Ontario Provincial Police investigation for "financial irregularities". Neither the police, Mathews nor Ornge would provide details about the nature of the investigation. The minister indicated it was as a result of the preliminary findings of the forensic auditors in examining the organization's financial records. Aside from the police investigation there are two other investigations underway. The Ministry of Health's emergency health services branch is carrying out an investigation of 13 incidents related to air ambulance operations, three of which involve the deaths of patients. Also provincial Auditor General Jim McCarter is investigating Ornge and will present his final report in March 2012.

On 17 February 2012, amidst calls for her resignation from the opposition, Ontario Health Minister, Deb Mathews announced that the government would greatly tighten control over Ornge, including new legislation and a new performance agreement to increase oversight and limit what it can do without government approval, including preventing the sale of assets, such as helicopters and the taking on of debt.

On 23 February 2012 allegations surfaced of unqualified staff running the air ambulance service and of a questionable $14,000 payout to a Brazilian law firm by an Ornge spin-off company. More information became available about the nature of the OPP investigation, including that the subject is alleged kickback payments for helicopter purchases as well as interest-free loans and cash advances from Ornge to Mazza. Filed bankruptcy documents indicate that Mazza is a creditor of one of Ornge's now-defunct for-profit companies and that he is owed $1 in the proceedings. The opposition continued calls for the minister's resignation as news of medevac operation disruptions in recent weeks surfaced.

On 21 March 2012 provincial Auditor General Jim McCarter released a report that heavily criticized the provincial government for lack of oversight of Ornge's operations. The report details that the government paid Ornge C$700 million over five years and that Ornge also borrowed an additional C$300 million for aircraft purchases. The report details how air ambulance costs increased 20% while transporting 6% fewer patients. McCarter reported how Ornge, "soon became a mini-conglomerate" with virtually no government supervision. He stated, "Of particular concern to us was the fact that certain of these companies were owned by Ornge's president, senior members of its management team and its board of directors. To the nose of this watchdog, this didn't pass the smell test." The report also details how Ornge bought more aircraft than it needed with government money with the aim of renting them out. Health Minister Deb Matthews said that the province will act on all of McCarter's recommendations.

The police investigation continues.

In February 2017, the OPP stated that the five year long kickback investigation was close to completion, but would not say whether charges will be laid.

=== Whistleblowers ===
Allegations were made that whistleblowers were harassed or fired. Lisa Kirbie, hired in March 2010 as the director of government and regulatory affairs, alleged in a lawsuit that Mazza was volatile and sexist, firing her without cause after she cooperated with the auditor and police probes. Kirbie was the partner of Liberal strategist Warren Kinsella.

Bruce Wade, a Thunder Bay helicopter pilot, was suspended with pay after testifying at a Queen's Park committee.

Opposition critics charged that the governing Liberals tried to intimidate whistleblowers during legislative committee testimony. Former paramedic Trevor Kidd was asked to disclose the names of other workers who had information about problems at Ornge. Kidd had testified that he quit Ornge in 2009 after the death of a patient. Kidd's father, the mayor of Temiskaming Shores, discussed Ornge's problems with former Liberal MPP David Ramsay in 2009.

Ornge belatedly announced whistleblower protection in 2013.

=== Motorcycles ===
Ornge commissioned two custom-built Orange County Choppers, allegedly gifts from Agusta, one of which was prominently displayed in the company's lobby. Mazza had posed at a Toronto Blue Jays game with the bike. The "chopper" became a focus of critics after the scandal was discovered. "That chopper is simply a reflection of how business was done. There are still a lot of people, let alone the chopper, in those offices who should not be there," noted PC MPP Frank Klees. The bike, valued at $50,000, was eventually auctioned for $30,000. The second bike, valued at $100,000 is thought to be owned by Agusta. The Ornge charity JSmarts also owned a $50,000 speed boat.

=== Nepotism allegations ===
Critics noted the rapid ("meteoric") rise of girlfriend Kelly Long to corporate power. A former water-ski instructor, she had apparently met Mazza while she worked as an account manager at a water-ski club. Pathway Group, a consulting firm used by Ornge, was asked by Mazza to hire Long. Pathway did so in January 2006 as a "favour". At Pathway she organized golf tournaments and did administrative work from home. Mazza was unsatisfied with the work assignments Long was given. He had her seconded to Ornge in September 2006. Pathway was paid nearly $9000 per month for this. Long was then hired by Ornge in December 2006. After that, she received a rapid set of four promotions between the various Ornge companies, rising to associate vice-president by 2012. Her salary had doubled during this time to $120000.

Long defended herself in testimony at a legislative hearing. She stated she felt had done a great job for Ornge and was qualified with a BA. She stated: "The media is insinuating I rose quickly because of my relationship ... with Dr. Mazza."

Carrie Anne Brunet was a junior Ornge executive who is the daughter of former chairman Rainer Beltzner. She assisted Long with the Agusta research. Beltzner would claim Brunet got the job via a newspaper ad.

Both Brunet and Long benefited from the MBA program. (Brunet graduating in 2012).

Hallie Beecher McClelland, the daughter of HR vice-president Rhoda Beecher, became the executive director of Ornge's foundation. Beecher defended the hiring process as "rigorous".

=== Coroner's investigation into patient deaths ===
An initial review of 10 deaths found that none had been "materially affected" by problems at Ornge. A second review explored all deaths involving Ornge between January 2006 and June 2012. By November 2012, this investigation was "taking longer than expected"

After a year long investigation, a special panel did find links between Ornge and patient deaths. Eight cases were found, although "scant" details were provided. Two cases were blamed on inadequate staffing of paramedics qualified for the mission. The interiors of the AW139 helicopters, making it difficult to perform CPR, were flagged as a serious problem. The panel made 25 recommendations for improvements.

== 2013 Ornge air ambulance Moosonee crash ==
2013 Ornge air ambulance Moosonee crash
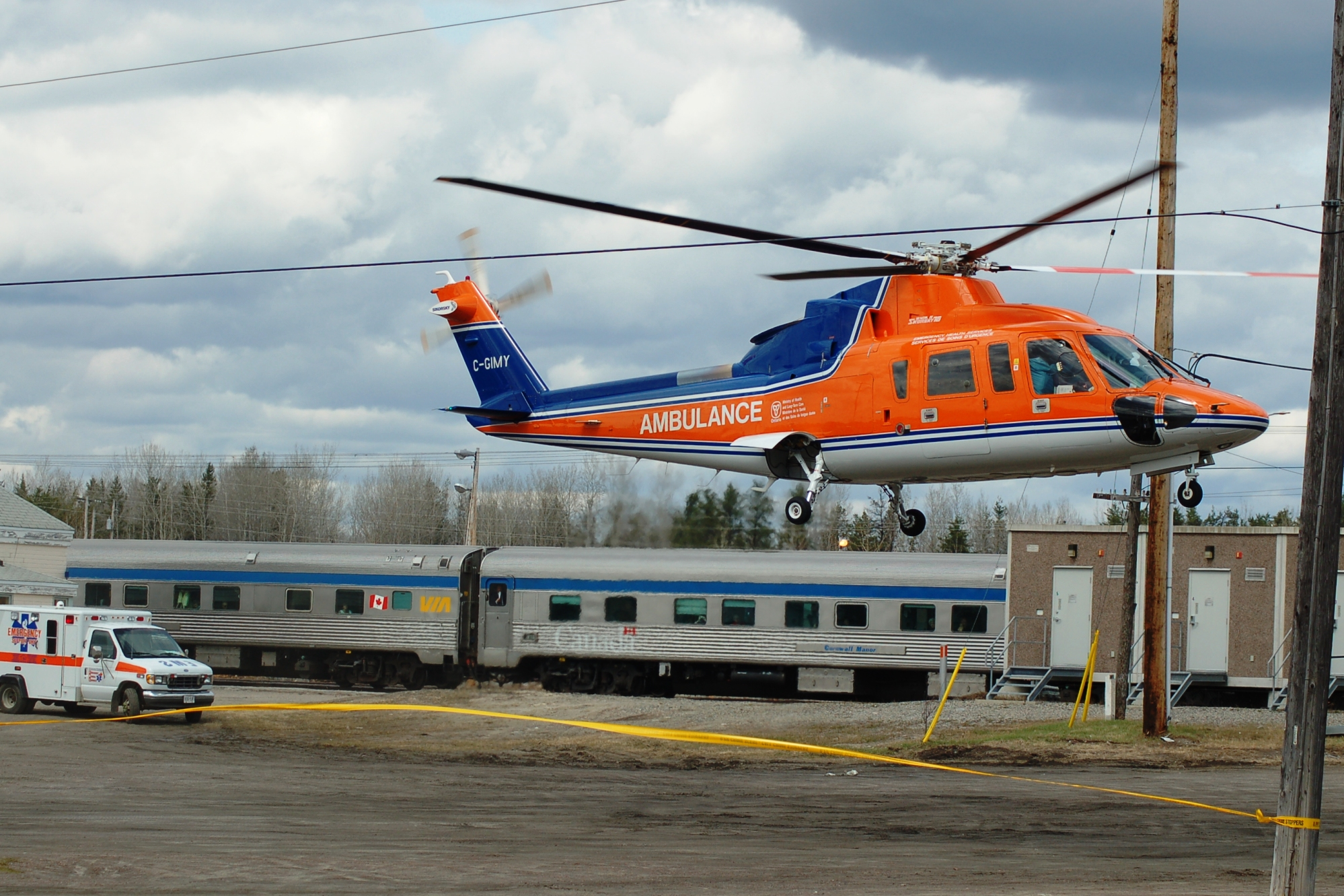
- C-GIMY, the helicopter involved in the accident, photographed May 2008

Accident
- Date: May 31, 2013
- Site: Moosonee, Canada

Aircraft
- Aircraft type: Sikorsky S-76A
- Operator: Ornge
- Registration: C-GIMY
- Flight origin: Moosonee Airport, Canada
- Occupants: 4
- Passengers: 2
- Crew: 2
- Fatalities: 4
- Survivors: 0

On May 31, 2013, a Sikorsky S-76A helicopter crashed resulting in the deaths of two Ornge pilots, Capt. Don Filliter and first officer Jacques Dupuy, and two Ornge paramedics, Dustin Dagenais and Chris Snowball. The crash occurred one kilometre from the Moosonee Airport, shortly after a night-time take-off.

=== TSB report ===
The Transportation Safety Board of Canada investigated the accident. The report noted: "The causes of this accident went well beyond the actions of this flight crew." The pilots had not received sufficient training. The company lacked standard operating procedures to deal with night operations. The company lacked resources and key personnel were inexperienced. Crew pairing was deemed "sub-optimal" for that flight. Some pilots were given inadequate time to prepare for training; the training did not meet company SOPs and was not operationally realistic. It was noted that in 2012, Ornge eliminated the pilot manager positions at each base, switching to a centralized scheduling system. Knowledge of local conditions and familiarity with crews was therefore lost.

Ornge was understaffed at the time of the accident. The Operations Manager and the Chief Pilot were new to the management of Emergency Medical Services operations. Key positions, such as Manager of Rotor Wing Flight Safety, Manager of Rotor Wing Flight Training and Standards, his assistant, and an aviation clerk (who was to track records) were vacant.

Transport Canada was aware that Ornge was struggling to meet regulations and company requirements. There were clear indications of Ornge's problems months before the accident.

TSB chair Kathy Fox said "[Ornge's] willingness to operate safely and within regulatory requirements exceeded its capacity to do so."

=== Canadian Labour Code charges ===
On 29 May 2014 Ornge was charged with 17 offences under the Canadian Labour Code. Court documents disclosed that the charges included permitting pilots to fly the S-76A helicopter "without adequate training in the operation of that specific aircraft," failure to provide the pilots with "a means to enable them to maintain visual reference while operating at night", that the aircraft captain, Donald Mark Filliter had "insufficient experience in night operations", that his pilot proficiency check in the helicopter was incomplete, plus the two pilots did not meet experience requirements to be flying as a crew. The organization was also charged with failure to ensure employee safety resulting in the death of the two pilots and also failure to ensure that the organization's supervisors and managers had sufficient knowledge of the Canada Labour Code. In October 2013, company officials had been warned by the Moosonee base safety officer that inexperienced pilots and night operations in combination was a high risk for a fatal accident.

The trial began at Brampton court in April 2017.

In court testimony, a check pilot noted he felt Captain Filliter "didn't have the necessary technical knowledge to serve as a crew captain".

In November 2017, the court found Ornge not guilty of negligence. The judge noted that while night-vision goggles and ground proximity alarms were available, they were not required under 2013 rules.

=== Civil lawsuit ===
In a 2016 lawsuit, Christopher Snowball's family is seeking $3.7 million from Ornge, Transport Canada and two unnamed Transport Canada inspectors.

=== Helipad dedication ===
In 2014, the helipad at Health Sciences North in Greater Sudbury was dedicated to the crash victims.

=== Follow on effects ===
After the accident, Ornge suspended night operations at 58 remote helipads (73 locations by another source). These locations are marked by reflective cones rather than lighting. Service was expected to resume as pilots were trained for un-lit sites or helipads had lighting upgrades. However, in early 2015, there were reports that Ornge was still unable to land at some sites, despite helipad upgrades. Ornge now has a "currency" requirement for night landings, that one of the two pilots must have landed at the helipad during the previous six months. It appears that Ornge might not have communicated this with local authorities.

== Aircraft fleet ==
The initial fleet of helicopters had a base white with yellow-black (Bandage 1) trim, followed by the orange with blue markings in the 1990s and finally the current orange with white markings. In 2020 and 2021, Ornge began to repaint their rotor aircraft in an orange and dark blue livery with a white stripe separating the colours, in a near hybrid of their first livery. One of the first aircraft to be painted was an AW-139 with the registration C-GYNL.

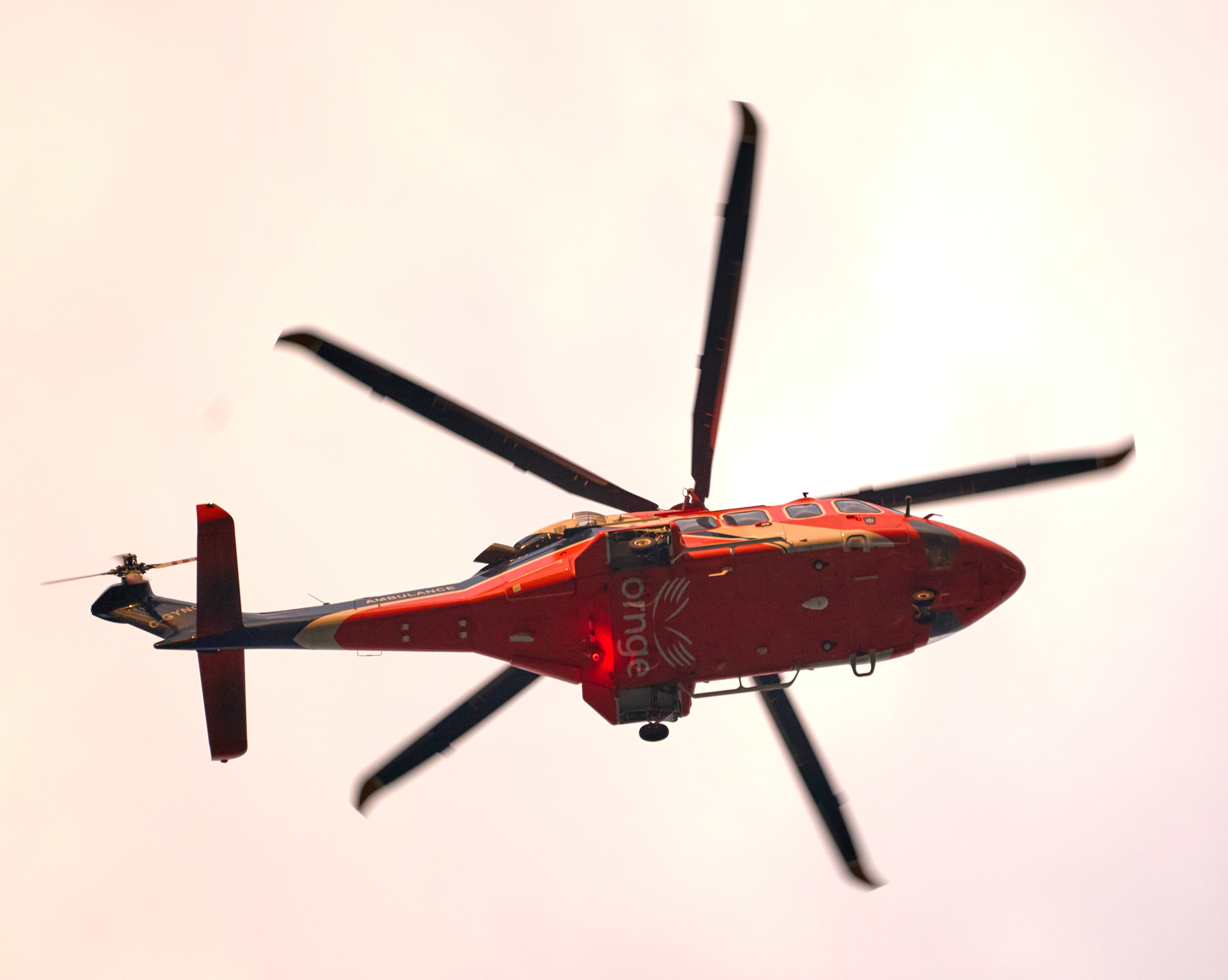
Ornge AgustaWestland AW139 helicopter, with the new livery, recently departed from the Sunnybrook Helipad.

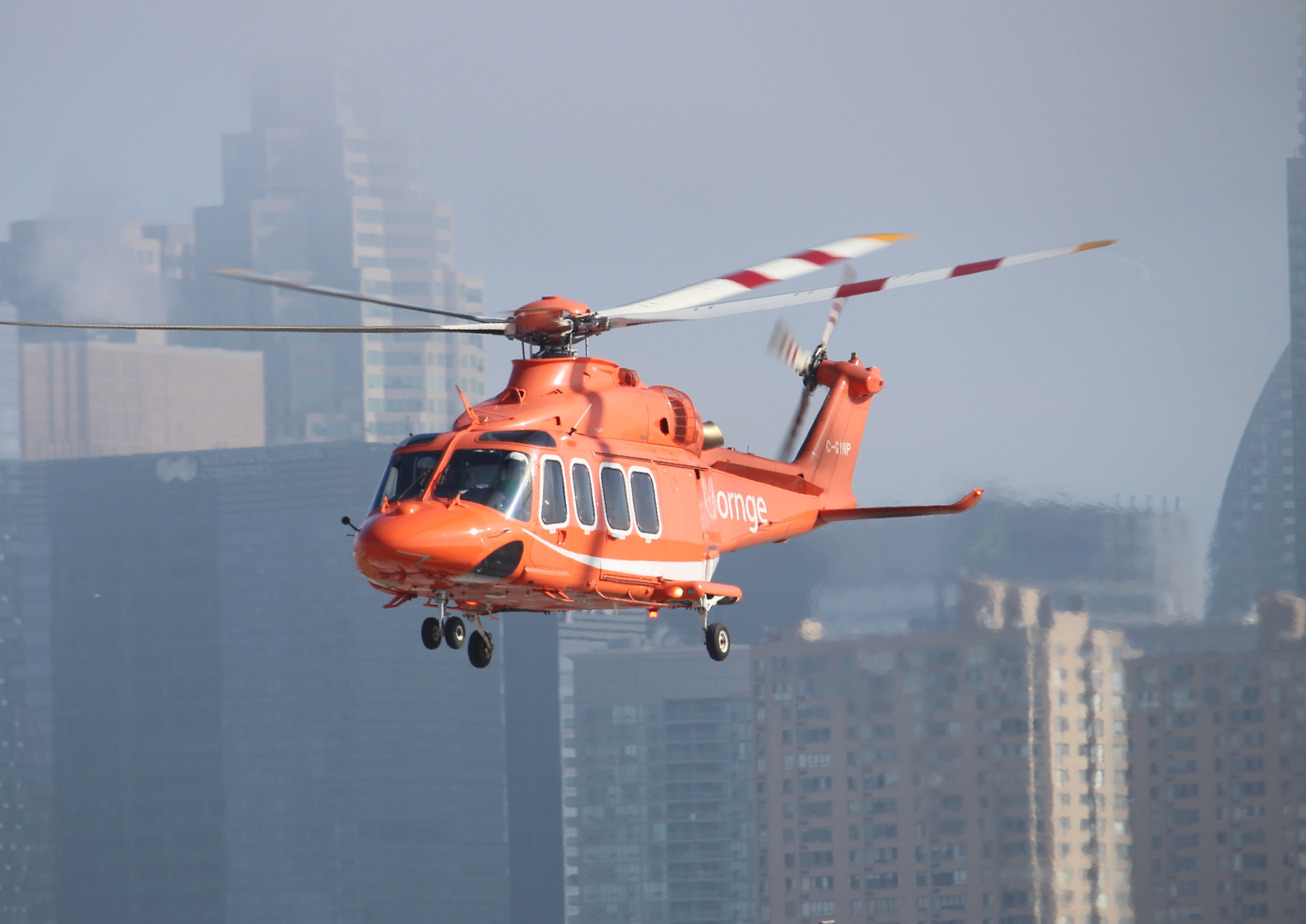
Ornge AgustaWestland AW139 helicopter landing at Billy Bishop Toronto City Airport

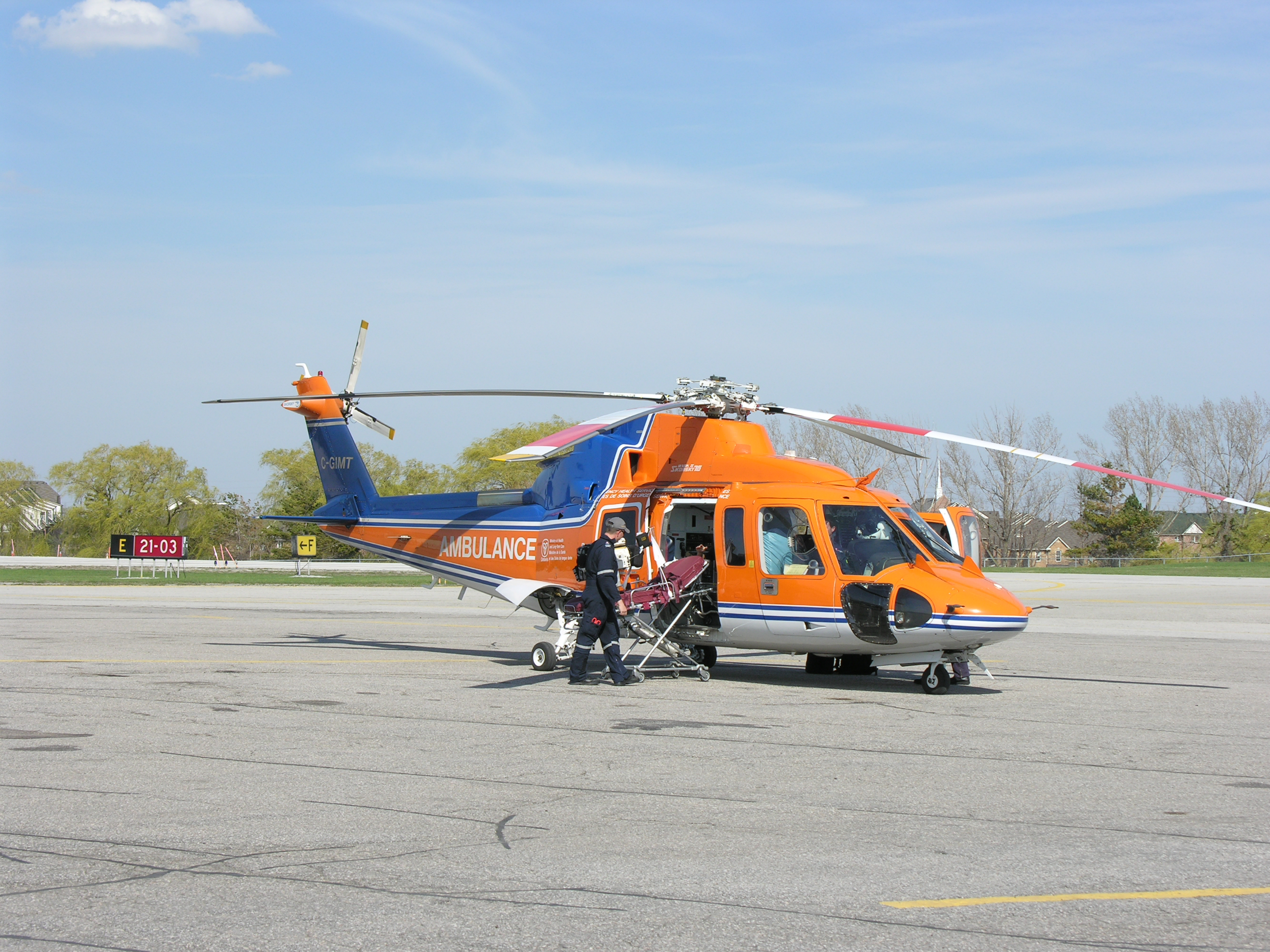
An Ornge Sikorsky S-76A (in old livery) preparing to receive a patient at Toronto/Buttonville Municipal Airport

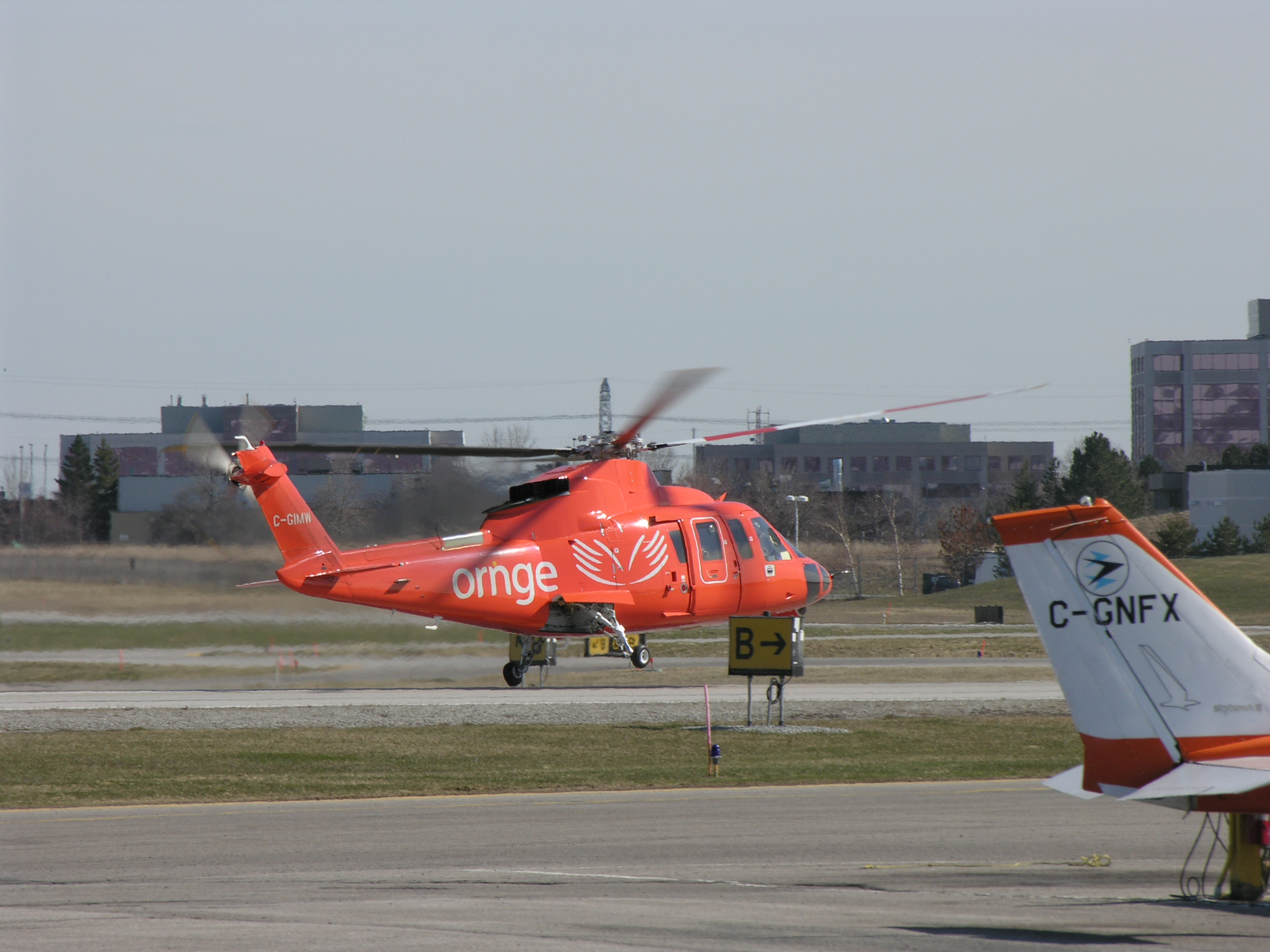
An Ornge Sikorsky S-76A lifting off at Toronto/Buttonville Municipal Airport

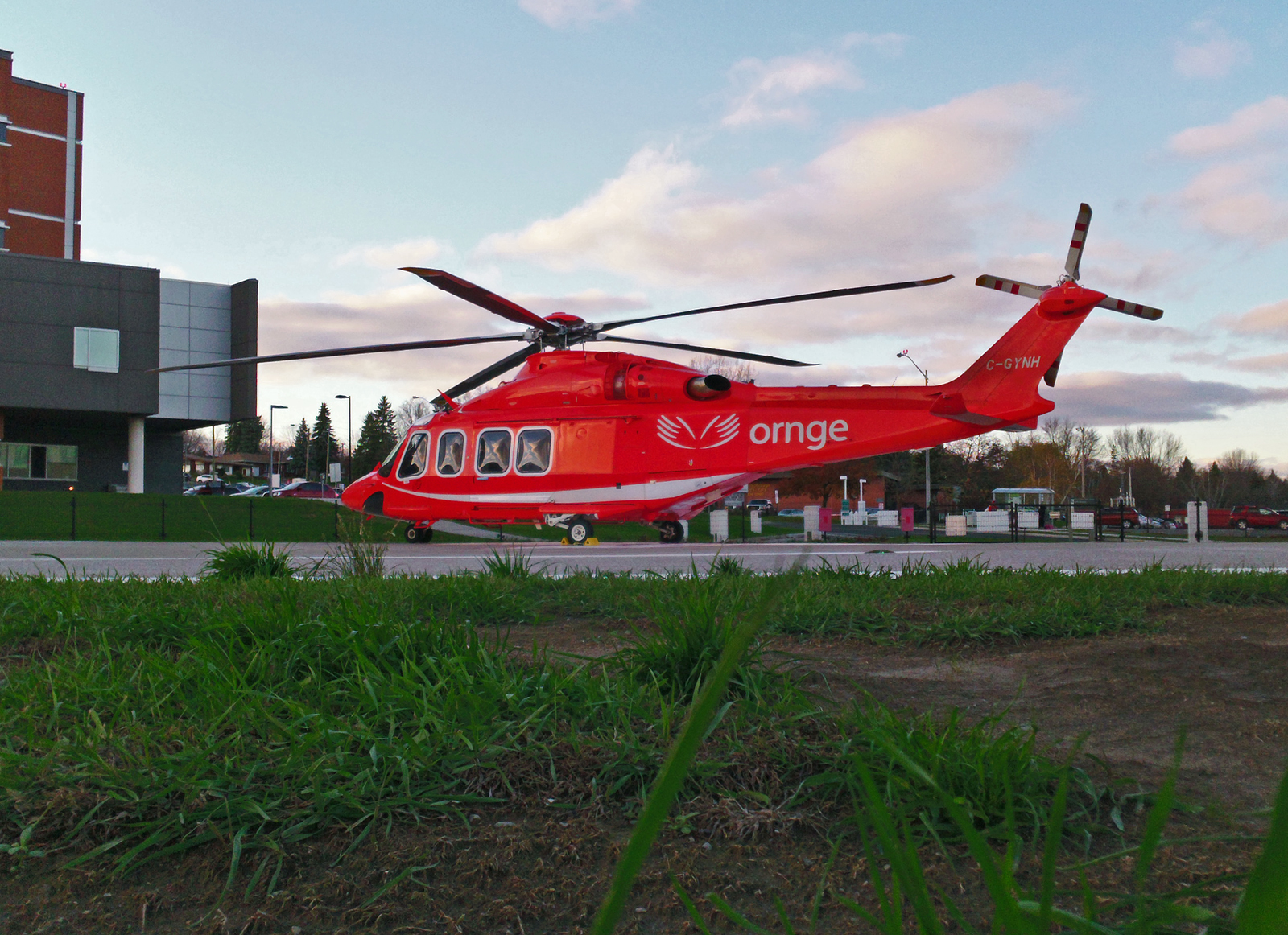
AgustaWestland AW139 at the Peterborough Regional Health Centre in Peterborough, Ontario.

On 28 August 2008 Ornge announced the purchase of ten new AgustaWestland AW139 helicopters to replace their fleet of Sikorsky S-76 helicopters, to be delivered over a period of two years beginning in late 2010. The S-76 helicopters were previously owned and operated by Canadian Helicopters, but are now owned by Ornge and operated by Canadian Helicopters. The S-76 helicopters will be serviced by Canadian Helicopters until April 2012.

=== Helicopters ===
The helicopter fleet operate as Nav Canada airline designator LF, and telephony LIFEFLIGHT.

AgustaWestland AW139 located at:

- Billy Bishop Toronto City Airport (2)
- Ottawa International Airport (1)
- Sudbury Airport (1)
- London International Airport (1)
- Kenora Airport (1)
- Thunder Bay Airport (1)
- Moosonee Airport (1)

From the first long weekend of the summer to Labour Day, one Toronto crew was relocated and based out of Muskoka Airport for the increased number of trauma calls in cottage country during this period. This practice stopped after the summer of 2010.

=== Fixed-wing aircraft ===
As of the end of 2009, Ornge has begun operating its own fleet of Pilatus PC-12NG fixed-wing aircraft from its bases in:

- Thunder Bay
- Sioux Lookout
- Timmins

As of February 2023, Ornge has eight Pilatus PC-12/47E (PC-12NG) registered with Transport Canada and operate as ICAO airline designator PUL, and telephony PULSE.

=== Land critical care ambulance ===
ORNGE operates three land transfer bases and 18 Crestline Coach Type III ambulances in Ontario

- Markham Base (Shields Court just north of Toronto and south of Buttovillle Airport) - both Critical Care and the Ted Rogers Pediatric Transport teams
- Ottawa Base (2094 Alert Rd, Ottawa International Airport)
- Peterborough Base
- Chatham-Kent Base

=== Standing agreement aircraft ===
Additional aircraft are available under the Standing Agreement (as and when required) contract with other operators:

- Thunder Airlines operating Mitsubishi MU-2 from Thunder Bay International Airport and Sudbury Airport.
- SkyCare Air Ambulance operating Fairchild Swearingen Metroliner and IAI Westwind from Sioux Lookout Airport, Thunder Bay International Airport, and Kitchener/Waterloo Airport.
- Air Bravo operating Pilatus PC-12 out of Thunder Bay International Airport, Sudbury Airport, and Lake Simcoe Regional Airport.
- Latitude Air Ambulance operating Beechcraft 1900, Learjet 35, and Gulfstream G100 from John C. Munro Hamilton International Airport.

=== Aircraft inventory ===
Aircraft	Country of Manufacture	Type	In Service	Notes
AgustaWestland AW139	Italy	multi-purpose medium-size commercial helicopter	10	owned and operated by Ornge; 2 sold off from the initial 12 purchased
Pilatus PC-12 NG	Switzerland	single engine turboprop	8	owned and operated by Ornge; used in Northern Ontario

=== February 2015 sale ===
In February 2015 reports surfaced that Ornge may look to sell its AW139 fleet due to maintenance costs and their unsuitability for ambulance work. Two PC12 are considered surplus to requirements and are for sale. "[The AW139] burns a lot of fuel. It's a big airplane. It is costly to maintain because of the complexity of the machine, more costly than say a simpler machine ... the AW139s are more suited to flying to offshore oil platforms and that few other agencies use them in an air ambulance role," according to CEO Dr. Andrew McCallum. Two of the AW139 units purchased were equipped with 12 seats and were unsuitable for ambulance use. These units were sold in 2013.

== Historical fleet ==
- Bell 212 1977-1990s - C-GONT (Bandage 1) was sold and re-numbered as XA-SVS in Mexico and written off in accident in Cozumel in 1994.
- BK-117 1988-1989 - trial only with aircraft destroyed by fire
- Beech 200
- Sikorsky S-76A 1980? - C-GIMZ donated to Centennial College Downsview Campus

== Accidents and incidents ==
- On 8 February 2008 a Sikorsky S-76 helicopter crashed while attempting to land at a remote helipad at night near Snake Lake, Ontario near Temagami, about an hour north of North Bay, Ontario. The 2 pilots and 2 paramedics aboard suffered injuries requiring hospitalization.
- On 31 May 2013 a Sikorsky S-76 helicopter crashed after departure from Moosonee, Ontario. Two pilots and two paramedics were on board. There were no survivors.
- On 22 December 2013 the rotor blades on an S-76 struck trees. Snow raised during a hover caused a white-out. No injuries occurred, but the helicopter was out of service for some time.
