= Attawapiskat =

Attawapiskat may refer to:

- Attawapiskat First Nation, a First Nation located in Kenora District in northern Ontario, Canada
  - Attawapiskat 91, the first designated reserve of the Attawapiskat First Nation
  - Attawapiskat 91A, the main populated reserve of the Attawapiskat First Nation, near the mouth of the Attawapiskat River
- Attawapiskat Formation, a geologic formation in Ontario
- Attawapiskat kimberlite field, a field of kimberlite pipes located astride the Attawapiskat River in the Hudson Bay Lowlands, in Northern Ontario
- Attawapiskat Lake, a lake in Kenora District, Ontario, Canada
- Attawapiskat River, a river in Kenora District in northwestern Ontario, Canada, that flows east from Attawapiskat Lake to James Bay
- Attawapiskat Airport, an airport adjacent to the Attawapiskat First Nation in Ontario, Canada
