= Zumar Lake =

Lake in Ontario, Canada

- Location within Ontario Location within Canada
- Location: Kenora District, Ontario
- Coordinates: 52°20′30″N 87°12′15″W
- Primary outflows: Ekwan River
- Basin countries: Canada
- Max. length: 3.7 km (2.3 mi)
- Max. width: 1.5 km (0.93 mi)
- Surface elevation: 239 m (784 ft)

Zumar Lake is a lake in Kenora District, Ontario, Canada, and the source of the Ekwan River, which flows into James Bay. It is about 3.7 kilometres (2.3 mi) long and 1.5 kilometres (0.9 mi) wide, and lies at an elevation of 239 metres (784 ft). The lake is just 8 kilometres (5 mi) northeast of part of the North Channel outlet from Attawapiskat Lake, the source of the Attawapiskat River, which also flows into James Bay.

== See also ==
- List of lakes in Ontario
