= Otoskwin–Attawapiskat River Provincial Park =

Provincial park in Ontario, Canada

- IUCN category II (national park)
- Location within Ontario
- Location: Kenora District, Ontario, Canada
- Coordinates: 52°10′17″N 87°35′02″W
- Length: 420 km (260 mi)
- Area: 82,529.00 ha (318.6463 sq mi)
- Designation: Waterway
- Established: 1989
- Named for: Otoskwin and Attawapiskat Rivers
- Governing body: Ontario Parks
- Website: www.ontarioparks.com/park/otoskwinattawapiskatriver

Otoskwin–Attawapiskat River Provincial Park is a provincial park in northern Ontario, Canada. As a waterway park, it protects the banks and waters of the Otoskwin and Attawapiskat Rivers, in Kenora District. It provides backcountry camping and extensive whitewater canoeing opportunities.

The park includes a 200-metre-wide (660 ft) strip of land on both shores of the lakes and rivers from the crossing of the Nord Road (formerly Highway 808) at the Otoskwin River to the mouth of the Muketei River on the Attawapiskat River. In the future, the park may be extended downstream to James Bay. There are more than 30 archaeological and historical sites, from ancient indigenous societies dating back to 3000 BC to fur-trading sites of the early 1800s.

Otoskwin–Attawapiskat River Provincial Park is a non-operating park. No services are provided, and the only facilities are 20 backcountry campsites. There are, however, two commercial fly-in lodges on Ozhiski Lake. Permitted activities include boating, canoeing, camping, fishing, and hunting, as well as snowmobiling in the winter. Due to its remoteness, visitors must be experienced in wilderness travel and skilled in handling whitewater.

At the crossing of the Nord Road at the Otoskwin River, the Otoskwin–Attawapiskat River Provincial Park abuts the Pipestone River Provincial Park that continues upstream along the Otoskwin River.

== History ==
The park is within the traditional territories of the Attawapiskat, Eabametoong, Marten Falls, Mishkeegogamang, and Neskantaga First Nations. Both the Otoskwin and Attawapiskat Rivers were once part of a major fur-trade route.

Portions of the Otoskwin and Attawapiskat Rivers were designated a wild river reserve in 1975. It was enlarged and formalized as a provincial park on May 27, 1989. In May 1996, the park lost about 40 hectares (99 acres) on Attawapiskat Lake that were transferred to the Neskantaga First Nation Reserve.
