= Attawapiskat Formation =

Geologic formation in Ontario, Canada

- Stratigraphic range: Silurian
- Type: Geological formation

Location
- Region: Ontario, Manitoba, Nunavut
- Country: Canada

The Attawapiskat Formation is a geologic formation in Ontario, Manitoba and Nunavut. It preserves fossils dating back to the Silurian period.

== Location ==
The Attawapiskat Formation encompasses a large portion of the Hudson Bay Basin. The formation remains visible from northern Ontario. A small portion of the formation does extend onto Nunavut territory.

== Composition ==
It is widely believed that the formation originally deposited on a shallow rimmed shelf, followed by the development of barrier reefs into an nonlinear and uncoordinated "belt" around the Hudson Basin. Within the Hudson Bay Lowlands, the formation consists of dolomite and limestone rich in both coral and sponge. The formation is a haven for lithotopes, or media for sediments to deposit, with various types including:

- Mottled to Nodular Skeletal Wackestone
- Stromatoporoid-Coral Framestone
- Pelodial Intraclastic Bindstone
- Graded Oolitic Grainstone

The formation's depth reaches 62 meters at its deepest.

== Fossil content ==
Color key: Taxon / Reclassified taxon / Taxon falsely reported as present / Dubious taxon or junior synonym / Ichnotaxon / Ootaxon / Morphotaxon	Notes; Uncertain or tentative taxa are in small text; ~~crossed out~~ taxa are discredited.

Brachiopods
Genus	Species	Presence	Material	Notes	Images
Eocoelia	E. akimiskii	Inter-reef beds of the formation, on Akimiski Island.	Over 300 specimens.		
Erilevigatella	E. euthylomata				
Gypidula	G. akimiskiformis				
Meristina	M. expansa	Ekwan River.		Now deemed a junior synonym of Pentameroides septentrionalis.	
Pentameroides	P. septentrionalis	Ekwan River and Attawapiskat River.			
Protanastrophia	P. repanda				
Reticularia	R. septentrionalis	Ekwan River.		Now deemed a junior synonym of Pentameroides septentrionalis.	
Sapelnikovia	S. (=Reveroides) norfordi	Attawapiskat River.		Now deemed a junior synonym of Pentameroides septentrionalis.	

Trilobites
Genus	Species	Presence	Material	Notes	Images
Acidaspis	A. sp.	Ekwan River at portage at Strong Rapids.			
Chiozoon	C. cf. cowiei	Ekwan River at portage at Strong Rapids.			
Dicranopeltis	D. sp.	Ekwan River at portage at Strong Rapids.			
Ekwanoscutellum	E. ekwanensis	Limestone Island, Severn River.	"Nested stacks of mostly inverted (concave-up) large sclerites, the majority of which are pygidia".	A scutelluine.	
Meroperix	M. aquilonarius	Ekwan River at portage at Strong Rapids.		A scutelluine.	
Opoa	O. sp.	Ekwan River at portage at Strong Rapids.			
Perryus	P. severnensis	Limestone Island, Severn River.	Several cranidia, pygidia and disarticulated exoskeletons.	An encrinurid.	
Stenopareia	S. sp.	Ekwan River at portage at Strong Rapids.		An illaenid.	

== See also ==
- List of fossiliferous stratigraphic units in Ontario
