= After the Last River =

- Directed by: Victoria Lean
- Written by: Victoria Lean
- Produced by: Jade Blair; Victoria Lean
- Starring: Theresa Spence
- Cinematography: Kirk Holmes
- Edited by: Terra Jean Long
- Release date: May 3, 2015 (DOXA)
- Running time: 86 minutes
- Country: Canada
- Language: English

After the Last River is a Canadian documentary film, directed by Victoria Lean and released in 2015. The film centres on the humanitarian crisis facing the Attawapiskat First Nation in the early 2010s, culminating in chief Theresa Spence's widely publicized hunger strike.

The film had its theatrical premiere at the DOXA Documentary Film Festival in May 2015, and had selected other theatrical screenings before airing on the Documentary Channel in 2016.

The film won the Nigel Moore Award for best film in the youth program at DOXA, and the award for Best Canadian Feature at the 2016 Planet in Focus festival. It received a Vancouver Film Critics Circle nomination for Best Canadian Documentary at the Vancouver Film Critics Circle Awards 2016, and a nomination for the Donald Brittain Award at the 5th Canadian Screen Awards in 2017.
