= Lawashi Channel =

- Location of the mouth of the Lawashi Channel in Ontario

Location
- Country: Canada
- Province: Ontario
- Region: Northwestern Ontario
- District: Kenora

Physical characteristics
- Source: Attawapiskat River
  - coordinates: 52°56′32″N 83°10′10″W
  - elevation: 30 m (98 ft)
- Mouth: Lawashi River
  - coordinates: 52°50′09″N 82°14′02″W
  - elevation: 1 m (3 ft 3 in)
- Length: 75 km (47 mi)

The Lawashi Channel is a river in Kenora District in northwestern Ontario, Canada.

== Course ==
The river is in the Hudson Bay Lowlands and is part of the James Bay drainage basin. The Lawashi Channel is an outlet from the Attawapiskat River and travels 75 kilometres (47 mi) to the Lawashi River, at a point 8.5 kilometres (5.3 mi) upstream of that river's mouth at James Bay. The mouth of the Lawashi River is approximately 11 kilometres (7 mi) southeast of the mouth of the Attawapiskat.

== See also ==
- List of rivers of Ontario

== Sources ==
- "Lawashi Channel". Geographical Names Data Base. Natural Resources Canada.
- "Toporama - Topographic Maps". Atlas of Canada. Natural Resources Canada. Archived from the original on 2010-02-10.
