= Poplar River (Atikameg River tributary) =

- Location of the river mouth in Ontario

Location
- Country: Canada
- Province: Ontario
- Region: Northwestern Ontario
- District: Kenora

Physical characteristics
- Source: Unnamed lake
  - coordinates: 51°44′42″N 84°50′45″W
  - elevation: 174 m (571 ft)
- Mouth: Atikameg River
  - coordinates: 51°48′59″N 83°43′04″W
  - elevation: 69 m (226 ft)

Basin features
- River system: James Bay drainage basin

The Poplar River is a river in northeastern Kenora District in northwestern Ontario, Canada. It is in the James Bay drainage basin and is a left tributary of the Atikameg River.

The Poplar River begins at an unnamed lake and flows northeast, then east to its mouth at the Atikameg River. The Atikameg River flows via the Kapiskau River to James Bay.

== Sources ==
- Map 17 (PDF) (Map). 1 : 1,600,000. Official road map of Ontario. Ministry of Transportation of Ontario. 2014.
