= Otadaonanis River =

- Location of the river mouth in Ontario

Location
- Country: Canada
- Province: Ontario
- Region: Northwestern Ontario
- District: Kenora

Physical characteristics
- Source
  - coordinates: 51°47′37″N 83°18′28″W
  - elevation: 73 m (240 ft)
- Mouth: Kapiskau River
  - coordinates: 52°45′50″N 82°04′35″W
  - elevation: 6 m (20 ft)

Basin features
- River system: James Bay drainage basin

The Otadaonanis River is a river in northeastern Kenora District in northwestern Ontario, Canada. It is in the James Bay drainage basin and is a right tributary of the Kapiskau River.

The Otadaonanis River begins on gravel and flows north-northeast to its mouth at the Kapiskau River, 7.5 kilometres (4.7 mi) upstream of the latter river's mouth at James Bay.

== Sources ==
- "Otadaonanis River" at Atlas of Canada. Accessed 2016-04-24.
- Map 18 (PDF) (Map). 1 : 1,600,000. Official road map of Ontario. Ministry of Transportation of Ontario. 2014.
