= Noluskatsi River =

- Location of the river mouth in Ontario

Location
- Country: Canada
- Province: Ontario
- Region: Northwestern Ontario
- District: Kenora

Physical characteristics
- Source: Unnamed lake
  - coordinates: 51°56′55″N 83°40′00″W
  - elevation: 74 m (243 ft)
- Mouth: Kapiskau River
  - coordinates: 52°06′01″N 83°31′23″W
  - elevation: 64 m (210 ft)

Basin features
- River system: James Bay drainage basin

The Noluskatsi River is a river in northeastern Kenora District in northwestern Ontario, Canada. It is in the James Bay drainage basin and is a right tributary of the Kapiskau River.

The Noluskatsi River begins at an unnamed lake and flows east and then north to its mouth at the Kapiskau River, which flows to James Bay.

== Sources ==
- "Noluskatsi River" at Atlas of Canada. Accessed 2016-04-24.
- Map 18 (PDF) (Map). 1 : 1,600,000. Official road map of Ontario. Ministry of Transportation of Ontario. 2014.
