= Otoskwin River =

River in Northwestern Ontario

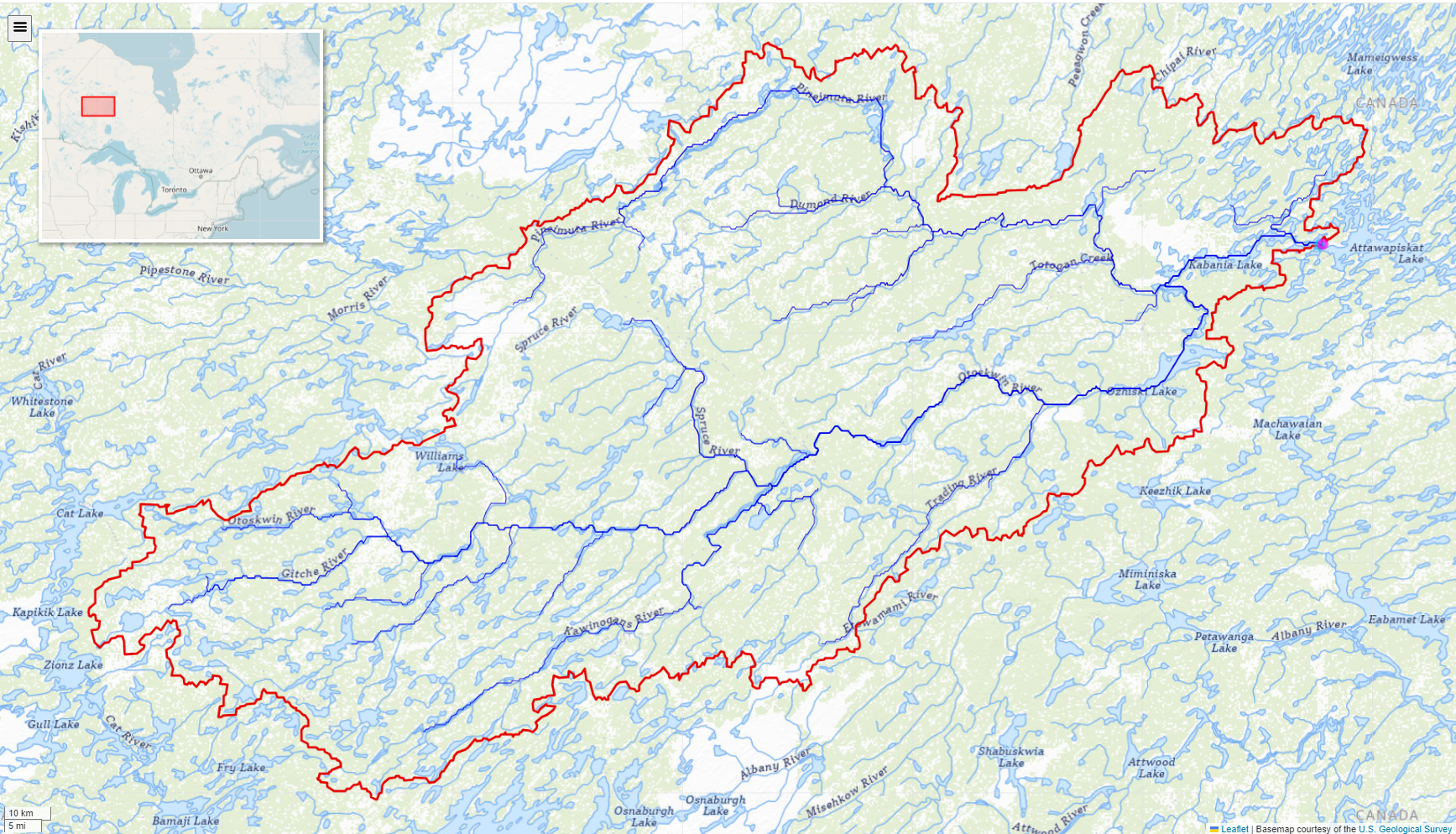
- Otoskwin River basin map

- Location within Ontario

Location
- Country: Canada
- Province: Ontario
- District: Kenora

Physical characteristics
- Mouth: Attawapiskat Lake
  - coordinates: 52°13′36″N 88°08′03″W
  - elevation: 242 m (794 ft)

Basin features
- Progression: Otoskwin→ Attawapiskat→ James Bay

The Otoskwin River is a river in Northwestern Ontario, Canada. This river, once part of a major fur-trade route to James Bay, is a significant tributary of the Attawapiskat River via Attawapiskat Lake.

The indigenous name "Otoskwin" means "elbow".

A contiguous section of the Otoskwin River from Otoskwin Lake to its mouth at Attawapiskat Lake is protected within the Pipestone River Provincial Park and Otoskwin-Attawapiskat River Provincial Park.

== Geography ==
The source of the Otoskwin River is on the Canadian Shield east of Cat Lake at the height-of-land between the watershed basins of the Attawapiskat and Albany Rivers. It flows in a predominant easterly direction, frequently widening into lakes which are separated by short stretches of stream with many rapids and falls. It flows through a region of low granite hills, mixed with considerable areas of muskeg.

After Badesdawa Lake, the river flows in a northeasterly direction to Ozhiski Lake, through land that is overlain by heavy deposits of glacial drift, often between 15 and 18 metres (50 and 60 ft) thick, while forming ridges rising from 21 to 30 metres (70 to 100 ft) above the general level in some places, with areas of muskeg and low sand-covered flats between them. The dominant forest trees are black spruce, tamarack, and occasional stands of white spruce, as well as balsam and aspen poplar, with Banksian pine and white birch on some of the ridges.

At Ozhiski Lake, the Otoskwin River continues north for 24 kilometres (15 mi) through many strong rapids with a high average flow rate. The Pineimuta River enters the Otoskwin from the north and almost doubles its volume. Turning east again for 32 kilometres (20 mi), the river enters the western end of Kabania Lake and then 3.2 kilometres (2 mi) east of Kabania Lake, the river drains into Attawapiskat Lake.

=== Tributaries ===
Significant tributaries and lakes of the Otoskwin River are (in upstream order):

- Kabania Lake
  - Pineimuta River (L)
- Ozhiski Lake
- Trading River (R)
- Jervis Bay River (R)
- Badesdawa Lake
  - Badesdawa River (R)
  - Kawinogans River (R)
- Spruce River (L)
- Bow Lake
  - Bow River (R)
- Dobie River (R)
- Otoskwin Lake
  - Williams River (L)
- Meen River
- Gitche River
