= Attawapiskat housing crisis =

Attawapiskat First Nation has a long-standing housing crisis, due to lack of adequate housing supply leading to overcrowding and health problems. The housing crisis is itself seen as the cause of other crises in the First Nation. In 2011, Chief Theresa Spence declared a state of emergency, which received widespread media attention. Since then, another state of emergency was declared in 2013 and the crisis has been the subject of several documentaries.

== Background ==
During his 2004 mission in Canada, Rodolfo Stavenhagen, UNESCO Special Rapporteur, observed first-hand the substandard conditions of on-reserve housing which included deteriorated units, lack of heating and insulation, leakage of pipes and toxic mould.

In November 2007, UNHCHR Special Rapporteur, Miloon Kothari, noted that overcrowded and inadequate housing conditions, as well as difficulties to access basic services, including water and sanitation, are major problems for Aboriginal peoples. He called for changes in federal and provincial government, legislation, policies and budgetary allocation for Aboriginal people.

On July 11, 2009 a massive sewage flood dumped waste into eight buildings that housed 90 people. De Beers, which operated the Victor Diamond Mine nearby at the time, donated and retrofitted two construction accommodation trailers intended as a short-term stop-gap measure, until the homes could be remedied or replaced. As of November, they were still housing 90 people who shared four stoves and six washrooms. On October 14, Chief Theresa Hall raised concerns about the federal government's lack of response to the housing crisis in Attawapiskat caused by the sewage back-up. The government subsequently claimed they had committed $700,000 to repair homes.

On January 14, 2012, Attawapiskat First Nation Housing Manager Monique Sutherland signed an affidavit with numerous items of evidence dating back to 2002 that attested the long-standing nature of the crisis. Evidence included official signed requests from social services, the local hospital, and physicians detailing a case-by-case urgent need for housing, particularly for the ill and elderly, citing problems with mould and mildew, over-crowding, and a lack of heat and running water. The affidavit included the description of one residence 300 square feet in size, housing three people, which was more like a bush camp.

== 2011 state of emergency ==
As of 2011, housing in the community consisted of 300 houses, five tents and 17 sheds. The trailers that had been donated by De Beers cost CA$100,000 per year to maintain.

On October 28, 2011, the First Nation's leadership declared a state of emergency in response to dropping temperatures, and the resulting health and safety concerns due to inadequate housing. Many residents were still living in tents, trailers and temporary shelters, and many residences and public buildings lacked running water and electricity. In one case, children, the elderly, and the ill were sleeping in rooms just a few feet away from the sewage spill from years prior that had not been adequately cleaned. In a 2011 statement, James Anaya, the UN Special Rapporteur on Indigenous Peoples, said that many residents in the community "live in unheated shacks or trailers that lack running water." Anaya noted that "aboriginal communities face higher rates of poverty, and poorer health, education and employment outcomes than non-aboriginals in Canada."

The housing crisis received widespread media attention following the declaration of a state of emergency.

Aboriginal Affairs Minister John Duncan claimed that officials in his department were unaware of Attawapiskat's housing problems until October 28, 2011, despite having visited the community many times that year.

In November, a spokesperson for the Department of Aboriginal Affairs stated that the reserve had received a commitment of $500,000 to renovate five vacant housing units, and that it had already received "a significant boost from Canada's Economic Action Plan and funding dedicated to a new subdivision, of which 44 houses have been completed".

In December 2011, the Canadian Red Cross mobilized to help meet immediate needs in the community.

=== Third-party management ===
In December 2011, the federal government placed the First Nation under third-party management, claiming financial mismanagement on the part of Attawapiskat's leadership was the cause of the crisis. Prime Minister Stephen Harper stated that Attawapiskat had received $90 million in transfer payments since the federal Conservative Party was elected in 2006, which the government asserted was enough to handle the crisis with proper management. However, analysis found that amount was an aggregate figure, including all federal funding for Attawapiskat over 5 years, which includes education, health care, social services, housing and other necessities, including the infrastructure and human resources required to deliver those services. According to the Huffington Post in 2011, it was estimated that $84 million was needed for housing alone in Attawapiskat.

Chief Theresa Spence called Attawapiskat being placed under third-party management "a slap in the face," and asserted that the funds the First Nation had received had been accounted for in alignment with "the reserve's co-management system that INAC put in place 12 years ago." The day after he arrived, Jacques Marion, the manager appointed by the federal government, was kicked out of the community. The third-party management ended in April 2012.

=== Federal government response ===
In December, twenty-two pre-fabricated homes were sent to Moosonee, intended to be sent onto Attawapiskat via the winter road. They arrived between February and April 2012.

On December 30, 2012, the Department of Aboriginal Affairs and Northern Development stated that $131 million will have been spent on Attawapiskat from 2006 to the end of fiscal year 2012–13, which included 60 houses that had been renovated or newly constructed and the new elementary school, then under construction. The Attawapiskat band received a total estimated revenue of $34 million in 2011: $17.6 million from the federal government, $4.4 million from the provincial government, and income derived from non-governmental sources.

=== Audit investigation ===
In response to the housing crisis, the federal government hired Deloitte to conduct a limited audit of the First Nation, which Attawapiskat agreed to voluntarily. The final report, titled "Audit of the AANDC and Attawapiskat First Nation (AFN) Management Control Framework" by Deloitte and Touche LLP was completed on September 28, 2012. The audit's investigation covered the period between April 1, 2005, and November 30, 2011. The area under scrutiny by the audit was the roughly $8.3M for "housing-related activities through the Capital Facilities and Maintenance (CFM) program, which included $6.85M for housing maintenance; $1M for immediate housing needs; and, $450K for housing renovations under Canada's Economic Action Plan."

The total amount of all AANDC funding to Attawapiskat First Nation which includes health, education, infrastructure, housing and administration, and more was approximately $104M over the timespan considered.

It was revealed in the audit that Canada Mortgage and Housing Corporation (CMHC) only conducted one physical condition review of Attawapiskat First Nation housing units during the period from April 1, 2005, to November 2011. The April 2009 review was conducted on a very small sample in a single 27-unit housing project built in 1990 and 1994. These units had "poor indoor air quality, high water table and overcrowding." CMHC had not shared this report with AANDC.

Recommendations from the audit included changes regarding loan eligibility, improvements in reporting, and book-keeping, for example, the suggestion that CMHC Physical Condition Reviews must be shared with AANDC. It was noted that there existed a chronic problem with collection of rent in arrears which was impeding loan payments to CMHC and the challenges of evicting tenants in an impoverished, remote northern community already plagued by overcrowding. The auditors found "an average of 81 per cent of files did not have adequate supporting documents and over 60 per cent had no documentation of the reason for payment." Additionally, the letter delivered to Chief Theresa Spence stated the audit revealed "no evidence of due diligence on the part of Attawapiskat of funding provided by Aboriginal Affairs and Northern Development Canada for housing projects and Health Canada for health-related projects."

According to Green Party MP Elizabeth May, the audit showed "an unacceptable level of expenditures for which proper documentation was not provided."

One positive outcome of the audit was the observation that AANDC, CMHC, and Attawapiskat First Nation "worked in partnership at the regional level to determine allocations of housing funds for the Attawapiskat First Nation."

A CBC radio report noted that insensitive timing of the announcement to CBC and the online publication of the audit just before a controversial, highly publicized and much anticipated meeting between Prime Minister Stephen Harper and First Nations leadership. CBC correspondent Terry Milewski reported that the auditors did "not allege fraud" but raised "questions about bookkeeping" on the part of the federal government and the band.

== 2013 state of emergency ==
As of February 2013, the network of trailers donated by De Beers were in disrepair. Monique Sutherland explained that the materials needed to renovate the trailers still had to be shipped up the ice road in February, but the work had begun. According to Sutherland, nothing in a housing plan written in 2010 had come to fruition, and pressure caused by lack of housing was growing along with the community's population.

As of 2013, according to Aboriginal Affairs and Northern Development, "only 46 of Attawapiskat's 316 housing units are considered adequate, while another 146 need major work and 122 a replacement."

In November 2013, a fire damaged a portion of the East End Trailers in Attawapiskat, displacing 80 community members. Another state of emergency was declared. Thirty people had to be evacuated to Kapuskasing for several weeks while repairs were undertaken.

== Legacy ==
In August 2012, a judicial review by the Federal Court found that the federal government's imposition of third-party management on the First Nation was "unreasonable in all circumstances." The judicial review blamed the bureaucracy, rather than politicians, for the problem in this case.

As of 2016, homes in Attawapiskat were mainly pre-fabricated wooden structures as well as some newer trailer units which arrived after the 2011 floods.

As of 2023, the housing crisis has not been meaningfully resolved. Chief Sylvia Koostachin-Metatawabin claimed that the federal government's response had been slow, and that the ongoing housing crisis was contributing to other crises, including homelessness, a mental health crisis, and opioid addiction. She suggested that a solution to the crisis could include increasing the First Nation's land base.

== In popular culture ==
The housing crisis is the subject of a 2012 documentary by First Nations filmmaker Alanis Obomsawin, The People of the Kattawapiskak River, and the 2015 documentary After the Last River by Victoria Lean. Obomsawin was present in the community in 2011, working on another film for the National Film Board of Canada, when the housing issue came to national attention.
