= North Wabassie River =

- Location of the river mouth in Ontario

Location
- Country: Canada
- Province: Ontario
- Region: Northwestern Ontario
- District: Kenora

Physical characteristics
- Source
  - coordinates: 51°43′10″N 83°30′50″W
  - elevation: 75 m (246 ft)
- Mouth: Atikameg River
  - coordinates: 52°21′40″N 82°52′13″W
  - elevation: 35 m (115 ft)

Basin features
- River system: James Bay drainage basin

The North Wabassie River is a river in northeastern Kenora District in northwestern Ontario, Canada. It is in the James Bay drainage basin and is a right tributary of the Atikameg River.

The North Wabassie River begins in muskeg and flows north to its mouth at the Atikameg River. The Atikameg River flows via the Kapiskau River to James Bay.

== Sources ==
- Map 18 (PDF) (Map). 1 : 1,600,000. Official road map of Ontario. Ministry of Transportation of Ontario. 2014.
