= Missisa River =

- Location of the river mouth in Ontario

Location
- Country: Canada
- Province: Ontario
- Region: Northwestern Ontario
- District: Kenora

Physical characteristics
- Source: Missisa Lake
  - coordinates: 52°15′21″N 85°04′37″W
  - elevation: 170 m (560 ft)
- Mouth: Attawapiskat River
  - coordinates: 53°01′37″N 84°54′02″W
  - elevation: 99 m (325 ft)

Basin features
- River system: James Bay drainage basin

The Missisa River is a river in northeastern Kenora District in northwestern Ontario, Canada. It is in the James Bay drainage basin and is a right tributary of the Attawapiskat River.

The Missisa River begins at Missisa Lake and flows north to its mouth at the Attawapiskat River, which flows to James Bay.

== Sources ==
- "Missisa River" at Atlas of Canada. Accessed 2016-05-03.
- Map 18 (PDF) (Map). 1 : 1,600,000. Official road map of Ontario. Ministry of Transportation of Ontario. 2014.
