= Streatfeild River =

- Location of the mouth of the Streatfeild River in Ontario

Location
- Country: Canada
- Province: Ontario
- Region: Northwestern Ontario
- District: Kenora

Physical characteristics
- Source: Streatfeild Lake
  - coordinates: 52°08′35″N 85°52′25″W
  - elevation: 181 m (594 ft)
- Mouth: Attawapiskat River
  - coordinates: 52°39′9″N 85°56′18″W
  - elevation: 148 m (486 ft)
- Length: 65 km (40 mi)

Basin features
- River system: James Bay drainage basin

The Streatfeild River is a river in Kenora District in Northwestern Ontario, Canada. It is a right tributary of the Attawapiskat River and its source is Streatfeild Lake, adjacent to the headwaters of the neighbouring Kapiskau River. The river lies in the Hudson Bay Lowlands and is part of the James Bay drainage basin.

== See also ==
- List of rivers of Ontario

== Sources ==
- Map 17 (PDF) (Map). 1 : 1,600,000. Official road map of Ontario. Ministry of Transportation of Ontario. 2012-01-01.
- "Toporama - Topographic Map Sheet 43C". Atlas of Canada. Natural Resources Canada.
