= Attawapiskat First Nation =

First Nation in Kenora District, Ontario, Canada

Coordinates: 52.9243°N 82.4300°W

Attawapiskat
- Band No. 143
- âtawâpiskâtw ᐋᑕᐙᐱᔅᑳᒼ
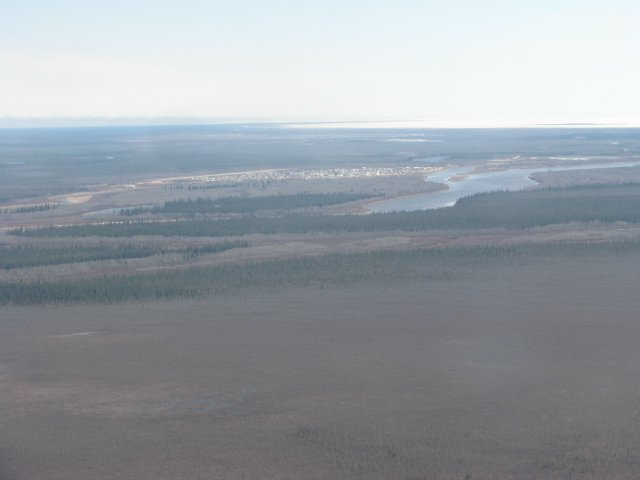
- Attawapiskat from the air in 2011
- People: Swampy Cree
- Treaty: 9
- Province: Ontario

Land
- Main reserve: Attawapiskat 91A
- Reserve: Attawapiskat 91
- Land area: 272.759 km^{2} (105.313 sq mi)

Population (November 2024)
- On reserve: 2010
- On other land: 115
- Off reserve: 1659
- Total population: 3784

Government
- Chief: Judy Sylvia Koostachin-Metatawabin
- Council size: 11
- Council: Deputy Chief Jack Linklater Jr.; Michael Stephen Hookimawillillene; Alexander James Kataquapit; Maggie Koostachin; Tesla Felicia Nakogee; Kara Rose Shisheesh; Jennie Rose Anna Sutherland; Robert Leonard Sutherland Mercier; Anthony Sheldon Kennedy Wesley; Ignace Xavier Wesley; Remi Gerald Wheesk

Tribal Council
- Mushkegowuk Council

Attawapiskat, (Note: /ˌætəˈwɑːpɪskæt/; Swampy Cree: ᐋᑕᐙᐱᔅᑳᒼ, romanized: âtawâpiskâtw) or Attawapiskat First Nation, is an isolated Cree First Nation located in Kenora District in northern Ontario, Canada, at the mouth of the Attawapiskat River near the west coast of James Bay. The First Nation controls the reserves at Attawapiskat 91 and Attawapiskat 91A, established upon the community's signing of Treaty 9 in 1930. The traditional territory of Attawapiskat extends beyond its current location up the James Bay coast to Hudson Bay and hundreds of kilometres inland along river tributaries.

The people of Attawapiskat maintain some knowledge of their ancestral Swampy Cree language and some still participate in subsistence living, hunting in the land around the reserves. However, Attawapiskat has access to modern amenities including telecommunications services and a hospital, as well as an elementary and high school. The community is connected to other towns along the shore of James Bay by the seasonal ice road constructed each December, linking it to Kashechewan, Fort Albany, and Moosonee. The now-closed Victor Diamond Mine is located close to the community.

Attawapiskat has received national media attention for several crises, including a crisis of inadequate and insufficient housing, a lack of clean drinking water, and a youth suicide crisis.

== Etymology ==
The name Attawapiskat is an anglicisation of the Swampy Cree phrase ê-tawâpiskâk (ᐁ ᑕᐙᐱᔅᑳᒃ), which means "it is open and rocky," as a description of the Attawapiskat River valley.

Another explanation by a community member gives the meaning of "Kattawapiskak Seepee" as "river between the rocks."

== History ==
The people of Attawapiskat are Mushkegowuk, also known as Swampy Cree or Hudson Bay Lowland Cree. Local oral history and documentation in the archives of the Hudson's Bay Company attests that ancestors of the present-day inhabitants of Attawapiskat had occupied an area extending from the Kapiskau River in the south, to Cape Henrietta Maria (the point where the coasts of Hudson's Bay and James Bay meet) in the north, and from Akimiski Island in the east to Mississa Lake in the west. Their traditional territory also extends to the modern-day Otoskwin–Attawapiskat River Provincial Park further west. Across this vast range, family units came together to form small bands, which have been identified by anthropologists according to the river basins they tended to occupy. According to John J. Honigmann, these included the Sutton River (which he calls "Namee'ko River") people and the Winisk Indians inland of Cape Henrietta Maria, and then from north to south the Lakitusaki River (aka "Lake"), Opinnigau, Attawapiskat, Lawashi, and Kapiskau bands. Honigmann identified these loosely defined bands as "Attawapiskat Indians" in his 1956 ethnographic study of Attawapiskat. Prior to an intensification of the coastal population in the fur trade era, Honigmann theorizes that the Attawapiskat people lived more inland, due to their reliance on the toboggan rather than the sled for transportation.^{:16}

The site of the present settlement at the mouth of the Attawapiskat River (the reserve known officially as Attawapiskat 91A) has for centuries been a gathering place for the Mushkegowuk. Attawapiskat was originally a seasonal camp that the Cree visited only in the spring and summer to take advantage of the bountiful fishing on a major river of James Bay. Historically, in the wintertime, families moved to more dispersed sites along the coast, inland or on Akimiski Island, where they trapped, hunted, and gathered roots, fruit and nuts. This way of life has persisted at least as recently as the 1950s, with family groups dispersing across the territory beginning in the autumn.

=== Fur trade era ===
By 1693, a permanent trading post controlled by the British Hudson's Bay Company (HBC) had been established at Fort Albany, marking the beginning of prolonged contact between the people of the area and Europeans, part of the European colonization of the Americas. This contact introduced the commercial fur trapping economy to the area. However, the influence of Europeans in Fort Albany likely did not extend to north of the Attawapiskat River until the early nineteenth century.^{:14}

After brief contact with some Jesuit missionaries during the period of French control of Fort Albany (1686-1693), the region did not see any attempts at christianization until 1848, when the Missionary Oblates of Mary Immaculate began making regular visits to Fort Albany, followed in 1852 by an Anglican minister from Moosonee. In 1853, the French-speaking Catholic Oblates travelled to the Kapiskau River, and began regularly visiting Attawapiskat soon after. The missionaries brought Cree syllabics to the community, which led to high literacy rates in Cree as of the 1940s.^{:14} In 1893, the Oblates built a Catholic church in Attawapiskat, and a residence for their missionaries in 1912. They established St. Anne's Indian Residential School in 1902 in Fort Albany, which children from Attawapiskat attended. An Anglican church was built on Akimiski Island between 1919 and 1922 before being abandoned and another built at the far west end of Attawapiskat by 1928, which was itself eventually abandoned due to lack of attendance.^{:14}

In 1894, HBC established a post in the area, "probably around the estuary of the Ekwan River," according to Honigmann.^{:14} Revillon Frères, a French competitor to HBC, built their own store at Attawapiskat in 1902. The competition between these two trading companies included extravagant incentives for trappers, possibly leading to overhunting of the region's fur bearing animals. The Revillon Frères store was eventually absorbed by HBC in 1936.^{:14}

According to Honigmann, in 1914-15, over half a dozen men from Attawapiskat joined the army and wound up cutting timber for sawmills in England and Scotland during World War I.^{:17} In 1917, 24 young men from the community were signed up by a recruiter for the Canadian Expeditionary Force, without anyone in the community knowing entirely what they had agreed to when the recruiter arrived in town.

Around 1922, in November, "an epidemic of an unknown respiratory disease" broke out, which killed many people in Attawapiskat, due in part to weather conditions and the lack of radio communication and ability to call for medical assistance.^{:18}

1928 was a year particularly noted for food scarcity in Attawapiskat, with the countryside largely depleted. One resident interviewed later by Honigmann reported that help was only provided by the Indian Agent if a man was so ill he couldn't stand; the Indian Agent would call the people of Attawapiskat "lazy" if they asked for food.^{:17}

=== Treaty No. 9 ===
On August 1, 1930, Attawapiskat was part of the adhesion to Treaty 9 with the governments of Canada and Ontario. Although Treaty 9 was originally signed in the years 1905 and 1906, those signings only included the communities south of the Albany River, which was then the northern limit of Ontario before it was extended north in 1912. At the time of the initial signing of the treaty, the people of Attawapiskat were included in the Albany band for the purposes of administration. They were separated into their own band in 1929 when the treaty commissioners travelled to deliver their annuity payments. At the time of the 1930 adhesion signing, the commissioners reported that there were 583 "Attawapiskat Indians," led by chief Xavier Chookomoolin and councillors Jacob Chookomoolin, Jacob Gull, and John Nakogee, who met the Treaty Commissioners at the trading post at the mouth of the Albany River. Signing the treaty established the Nation's band government under the Indian Act, and a reserve inland on the Ekwan River, a parallel river north of the Attawapiskat River that drains into James Bay, totalling 104.4 square miles (27,039.48 hectares). According to the treaty commissioner, this site was agreed upon because coastal hunting had been poor in recent years, and that the location would be central for the band's wide-ranging members. As of anthropologist John J. Honigmann's visit in 1948, the site remained unsurveyed, and he suspected the community to "relinquish" it "in favour of a more accessible location."

In response to the scarcity of fur-bearing animals in the early twentieth century, the Hudson's Bay Company established beaver preserves on Attawapiskat territory, namely one north of Kapiskau River and one on Akimiski Island.

=== 1930s to present ===
Map of Attawapiskat territory with approximate extent of traplines used by people trading at Attawapiskat and Lake River c. 1948.

While nobody from Attawapiskat was recruited to join the army at the outbreak of World War II, according to Honigmann "about a dozen" young people left to work in southern Ontario during the war, several of whom stayed near Acton and Guelph until at least 1948.^{:17}

In 1943, a measles epidemic broke out in the community, taking the lives of at least 41 children and young people. Two temporary hospitals were established to assist with the outbreak.^{:18}

According to anthropologist John J. Honigmann writing in the late 1950s, after establishing their own infrastructure near the trading post, members of the mission seem to have taken charge of some of the planning of the modern-day settlement. A loudspeaker located in the church provided announcements to the community. From 1927 to 1960, the mission operated a sawmill. The mission also operated a day school as of 1948 in Attawapiskat proper, with students between the ages of six and fourteen.^{:38} Mission members were engaged in deciding where houses would be built, draining paths, and instructing workers. This management was criticized by the Indigenous people employed in this work at the time.

Honigmann observed that Attawapiskat in the late 1950s was a "community in which the chiefs and councillors possess practically no power and display little effective leadership," being part of a political system that was imposed on the community and had nothing to do with how the people were used to organizing themselves. The individual chiefs and councillors were frequently bypassed by the Indian Agent as being ineffective, since they had been thrust into administrative roles for which they were largely not prepared.^{:47-48}

The presence of the existing trading post at the mouth of the Attawapiskat River led to that location being a hub for the community. though people continued to live on the land stretching between Lawashi River and Cape Henrietta Maria at least into the 1950s. The reserve at that site, which contains 235.8 hectares, is Attawapiskat Indian Reserve 91A. Since the 1950s, the town has developed from a settlement of temporary dwellings, such as tents and teepees, to a community with permanent buildings. These were constructed in the late 1960s and early 1970s. The majority of the First Nation members moved to the community as late as the mid-1960s.

The Northern Store took over the operations of the HBC store in the 1980s.

In June and July 2025, to protest the proposed development of the mineral-rich Ring of Fire region and the passage of the One Canadian Economy Act, community members set up camps and planted flags along the river where bridge crossings had been suggested. The protest responds to a lack of government consultation with the First Nations of the region. It is also a way for the families participating to "reassert" their presence on the First Nation's traditional land.

== Geography ==
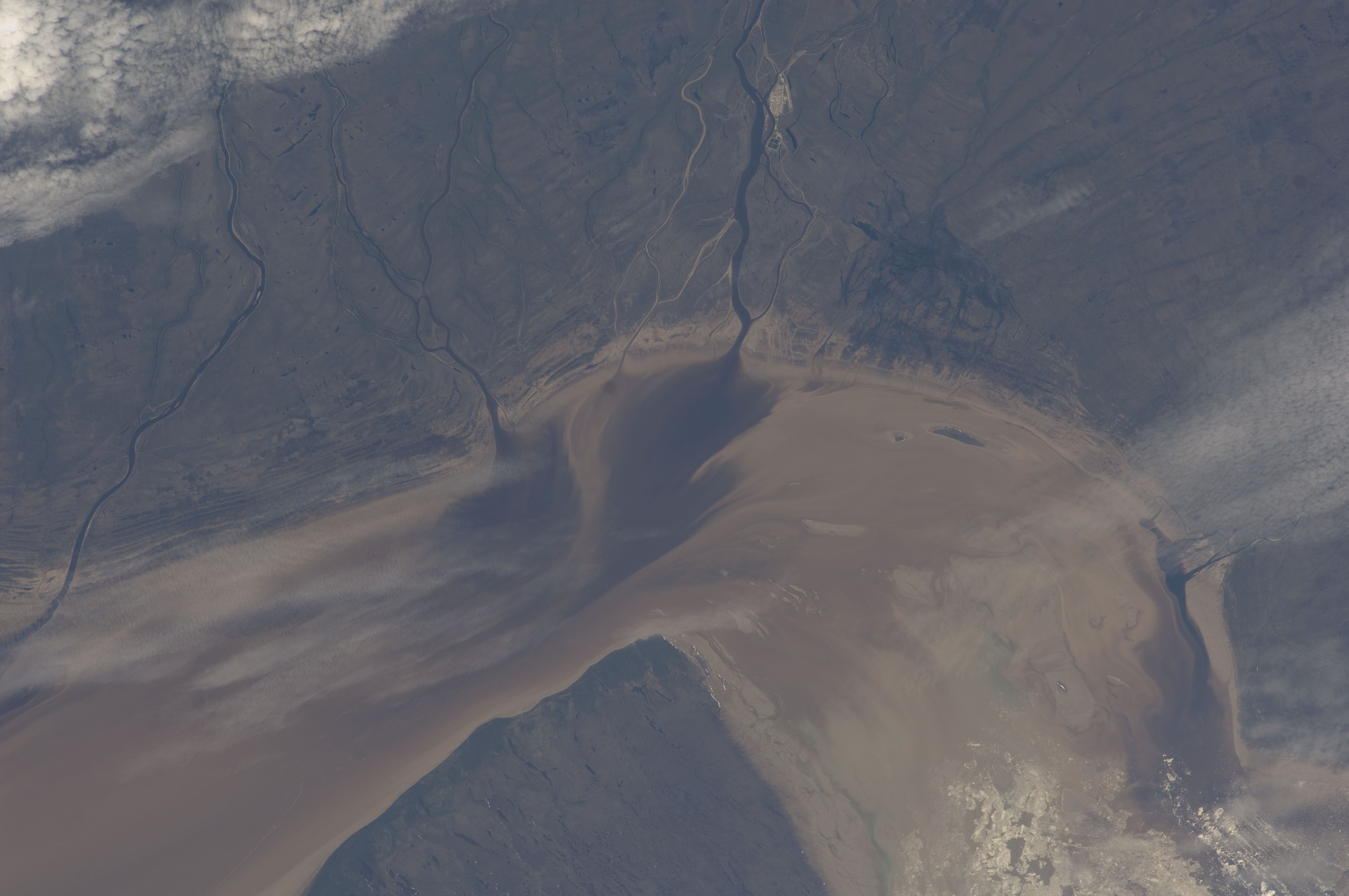
Attawapiskat 91A (top) seen from the International Space Station in 2009. The western point of Akimiski Island is at the bottom of the photo.

The main town of Attawapiskat covers 9.331 square kilometres (2,306 acres) of land and is located on the left bank of the Attawapiskat River, 5 kilometres (3.1 mi) inland from the James Bay coastline, on the reserve officially known as Attawapiskat 91A. It is located in the Kenora District within Northwestern Ontario. Timmins, the nearest urban centre, is located approximately 500 kilometres (310 mi) south. The town of Moosonee is 160 kilometres (99 mi) south of Attawapiskat.

The town is the social and commercial hub of a much larger area, where Attawapiskat people often hunt and occasionally live. These hunting grounds consist of about 15,000 square miles (39,000 km^{2}) of Hudson Bay Lowlands, a vast wetland located between the Canadian Shield and James Bay and Hudson Bay.

The vegetation is typically subarctic, with a mostly coniferous forest (stunted black spruce and tamarack) in the muskeg. Wildlife includes geese, ducks, caribou, moose, beaver, bear, wolves, wolverine, marten, rabbit, muskrat, otter, and other species.

According to a 1999 report by the Wakenagun Community Development Corporation, the land around Attawapiskat had 0.8 metres (2 feet 7 inches) of fertile soil, underlain by clay and silt.

It is normal for the Attawapiskat River to rise 1 to 2 metres during the spring thaw and break-up. As of 1999, the community had occasionally had to deal with recurring partial and complete flooding.

=== Geology ===
The name Attawapiskat refers to rocks around the Attawpiskat River. These are unique clusters of high limestone islands carved out by the river less than 100 kilometres (62 mi) from its mouth.

The Attawapiskat kimberlite field is a field of kimberlite pipes in the Canadian Shield located astride the Attawapiskat River on Attawapiskat First Nation land. It is thought to have formed about 180 million years ago in the Jurassic period, when the North American Plate moved westward over a centre of upwelling magma called the New England hotspot, also referred to as the Great Meteor hotspot.

The area is composed of 18 kimberlite pipes, 16 of which are diamondiferous. The De Beers open pit Victor Mine was developed on top of the Victor pipe. Mines from Victor Main and Victor Southwest have appeared close enough to the surface to be used in an open-pit mine. The Victor Kimberlite is a composition of pyroclastic crater facies and hypabyssal facies, and is considered to have a highly variable diamond grade.

=== Climate ===
In his report on the community in the late 1940s, John J. Honigmann provided some insight into the nature of the climate at the time. He described hot summer days followed by cool nights and long, cold winters, typical of northern North America. Near constant severe winds in the winter increased rates of frostbite. He reported that the coldest temperature he recorded was −25 °F on March 7, 1948 at 9:00 PM.^{:12}

As of Honigmann's report in the late 1940s, the rivers usually froze around mid-November, but did not become solid enough for planes to land until late December. The rivers typically began to thaw around mid-March and broke up around mid-May, being fully clear of ice by the end of the month.^{:12}

In May 2008 hundreds of people were evacuated from the community after a state of emergency was declared. The threat stemmed from the possibility of ice jams in the Attawapiskat River and subsequent flooding. Flooding conditions the following year also caused evacuations.

On May 1, 2013, officials announced the closure of all schools in the community because of flooding.

=== Reserves ===
Attawapiskat First Nation reserves

The community's main reserve is Attawapiskat 91A, located on the bank of the Attawapiskat River near the west coast of James Bay. Most of the population lives on that site, with others living up and down the James Bay coast. The First Nation also controls Attawapiskat 91, a larger site located further inland on the Ekwan River.

== Demographics ==
The people of Attawapiskat are part of the Swampy Cree, also called Nehinaw or Mushkegowuk. An individual of the Swampy Cree is referred to in their language as "inninew" (a person, part of the Cree people). They are a division of the wider Cree Nation whose territory extends from northern Saskatchewan, through northern Manitoba along the Saskatchewan River, down the coast of Hudson's Bay and inland areas of Northern Ontario, through to the James Bay coast.

=== Population ===
As of the 2021 Canadian census, Attawapiskat 91A had a population of 1,586. As of May 2025, the First Nation had a registered population of 3,793, of whom 2,007 reportedly lived on their Nation's own reserve, 88 on other reserves, and 26 on their Nation's own crown land, the remaining 1,672 living elsewhere.

==== Population history ====
The commissioners responsible for the Treaty 9 adhesion signing on August 1, 1930 reported a population of 583.

According to anthropologist John J. Honigmann, Attawapiskat's resident population in July 1947 was 468, despite a band population on the official census of 645. He explained the discrepancy by noting that a number of Attawapiskat band members are hospitalized or resident elsewhere, and that the "Attawapiskat band" was a legal coining of the Department of Indian Affairs, without much bearing on how the people of the region actually organized themselves.^{:19}

In his anthropological report of 1948, Honigmann noted that two groups could be distinguished within the population of the federally-defined Attawapiskat band, namely those people who traded at Lakitusaki River (which he calls "Lake River") and those who traded at the Attawapiskat trading post or winter outpost up the Attawapiskat River. According to Honigmann, this division manifested in relatively few marriages between families that trapped in areas far away from each other, as well as the fact that no previous elected chiefs had come from the Lakitusaki River people; rather, the one of the three elected councillors from that community usually oversaw their affairs. He also noted minor divisions between mainlanders and people from Akimiski Island, as well as from far inland people and those from the coast.^{:45-47}

Honigmann observed that the population had decreased to only 300 by 1955, and he attributed that decline to migration towards communities further south like Fort Albany and Moosonee.

=== Language ===
The traditional language of the people of Attawapiskat is the Swampy Cree language, an "n-dialect" along the Cree language continuum. 575, or approximately 37.4% of respondents to the 2021 Canadian census reported Cree as their mother tongue. No other non-official languages were reported as a mother tongue, but 400 (24.5%) respondents reported either English or French and a non-official language as their mother tongue. 615 (39.5%) reported English as their mother tongue.

Almost all of the 1,586 respondents in the 2021 Canadian census reported knowing English, with 10 individuals reporting knowledge of French too, and only 5 reporting knowledge of neither of the official languages of Canada.

As of 1958, anthropologist John J. Honigmann reported that "only one or two men command English" (out of a population between 300 and 400). According to a 1998 thesis by Norbert W. Witt, about 98% of the population of Attawapiskat at that time spoke Swampy Cree. As of 2003, many elders understood very little English; they spoke Cree and other Aboriginal languages.

=== Religion ===
In 1893, a Catholic chapel was erected in the community by missionaries from the Oblates of Mary Immaculate. Possibly due to the Catholic instruction many in the community received at St. Anne's Indian Residential School, as of the 1950s, most of the community attended Sunday Mass, and the Anglican congregation was limited to one family. The modern-day St. Ignatius Catholic Church was built in 1935, maintains the local cemetery, and remained the only church in the community until the construction of two Pentecostal places of worship. St. Ignatius is located within the Roman Catholic Archdiocese of Keewatin–Le Pas. A second large burial grounds, St. Mary Cemetery, is located in the west end of town.

== Economy ==
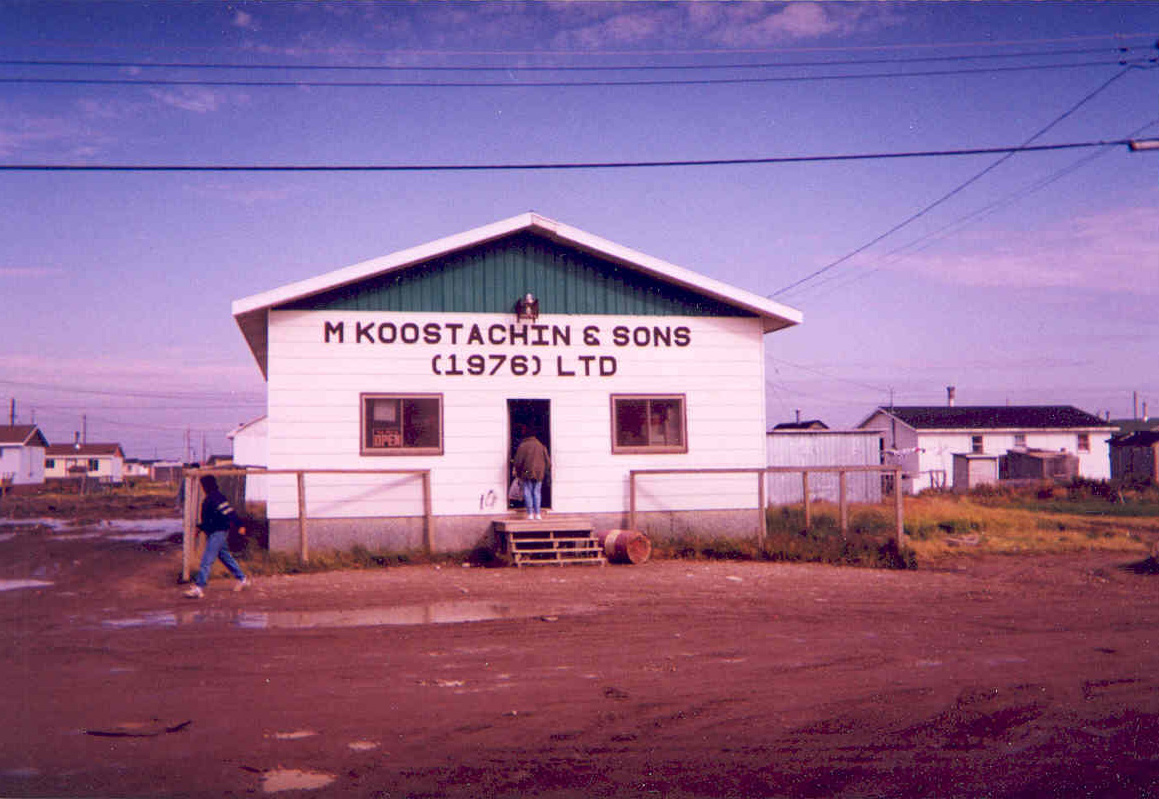
M. Koostachin & Sons (1976), a locally owned store

Tourism and subsistence are among the primary means that the people of the Hudson Bay Lowlands make their living, due to a lack of timber and minerals. Historically, livelihoods were gained through traditional hunting and trapping, including of fur-bearing animals which could be traded through the Hudson's Bay Company.

There are only a handful of businesses in town.

=== Subsistence ===
In 1990 Dr. Fikret Berkes, Distinguished Professor and Canada Research Chair at the University of Manitoba, and a team of academics interviewed 925 aboriginal hunters from eight communities of the Mushkegowuk region, including Attawapiskat. Their results published in 1995 showed "that geographically extensive land use for hunting and fishing persists in the Mushkegowuk region, some 250,000 square kilometres (97,000 sq mi)." However, they found that hunting patterns had changed over the past few decades, now most hunters undertook "numerous short trips of a few days' duration instead of the traditional long trips" which had been observed by anthropologist John J. Honigmann in the 1950s. Berkes' team found that, despite the fact that the First Nations under consideration only controlled 900 square kilometres (350 sq mi) (0.36% of the region) as Indian reserve land, "they continued to use large parts of their traditional territory."

In her Masters thesis (1998), Jacqueline Hookimaw-Witt, a Muskego-Cree, interviewed elders from Attawapiskat who described in great detail ways in which they continued to harvest, fish and hunt for food, clothing, crafts and subsistence to complement store-bought items. Hookimaw-Witt was the first Muskego-Cree to earn a doctorate.

=== Welfare ===
As of 1958, a significant amount of the community's income came from government welfare, provided to "the old, women whose husbands are away in hospitals, and to young adults working on houses for themselves and, therefore, unable to hunt for meat in the summer," according to anthropologist John J. Honigmann. Honigmann attributed the dependence on government aid in part to the scarcity of fur-bearing animals in the area, as well as the inadequate role community members felt the government played in upholding Treaty 9, by which they asserted that "the federal Government promised to care for the Indians."

=== Victor Diamond Mine ===
De Beers Canada officially opened the Victor Diamond Mine, Ontario's first ever diamond mine on July 26, 2008. As of August 2009, De Beers had spent approximately $1 billion on construction of the mine. It was an open-pit mine mining two kimberlite pipes, located 90 kilometres (56 mi) west of the settlement of Attawapiskat on the nation's traditional land. The mine had been expected to produce 600,000 carats (120 kg) of diamonds a year.

The Canadian Business Ethics Research Network summarises the establishment of a framework between the First Nation and the mining company thus:

"Traditional harvesters from Attawapiskat First Nation regularly hunt caribou, goose, and fish along the Attawapiskat River, while tending trap lines throughout the region. Like many other northern Cree communities, these traditional activities are more than subsistence, comprising an important part of local culture and identity. Therefore, the community leadership was very concerned with the proposed development of the Victor mine, and, at De Beers' invitation, sought to ensure that any environmental impacts of the mine would be effectively mitigated."

An Impact-Benefit Agreement (IBA) was signed with community leaders in 2005 with Danny Metatawabin acting as coordinator for the IBA between De Beers and Attawapiskat. The IBA set out how the community would benefit with respect to employment and business opportunities, training and education, sound environmental management and financial compensation for loss of the use of the land while it is being mined. The IBA did not address topics such as housing and infrastructure in the community.

In 2009, community members protested the agreement through demonstrations and roadblocks, claiming that the community's share of the "bounty from the mine isn't getting back to the community." In August 2009 community members travelled to Toronto to confront De Beers Canada about the growing prosperity of the company and the growing poverty in the community. De Beers had negotiated a lease area. Although it was acknowledged that the mine was on Attawapiskat traditional land, the royalties from the Victor Mine were flowing to the Province of Ontario, not Attawapiskat First Nation. As of 2013, the mine had 500 full-time employees, with 100 from the First Nation. De Beers also employed members of Attawapiskat First Nation in winter road construction and as sub-contractors. According to Global News in 2013, "a federal review of the relationship between De Beers' Victor mine and Attawapiskat showed that government support for training and capacity did not start soon enough to deal with the huge lack of skills in the First Nation." In 2013, Attawapiskat community members blockaded the road to the mine, and the company and First Nation entered into mediation to resolve the dispute.

As of 2013, the mine generated "about $400 million in annual revenue for the company." The Attawapiskat Trust, established January 1, 2007, received payments made by De Beers Canada and Attawapiskat Limited Partnership as part of the IBA. As of January 2011, the company had transferred about $10.5 million to the trust fund. The beneficiary of the trust includes "all members of Attawapiskat on a collective and undivided basis."

The mine closed in 2019.

=== Cost of living ===
As of 2011, it cost CA$250,000 to build a house in Attawapiskat. The cost of renovating one condemned house was $50,000–100,000. At the height of the national attention on the housing crisis in the early 2010s, the majority of community members had updated their heating needs, while many households still used dry firewood. Firewood in Attawapiskat cost $150 and $200 a cord, and a cord could heat a winter-bound tent for only a week, or at most 10 days.

== Arts and culture ==
Many community members have maintained traditional social structures and philosophies in a deeper fashion than in other, less isolated First Nations communities. Some elders lead a traditional life on the land, moving into the community only during Christmas season. Some families, despite having their home base in the community, use the land extensively as their economic and social basis. The vast majority of community members are involved in the annual goose hunts in fall and spring. Most of the members of Attawapiskat First Nation are aware of their traditions.

Traditional harvesters from Attawapiskat First Nation continue to regularly hunt caribou, goose, and fish along the Attawapiskat River, while tending trap lines throughout the region. Their activities go beyond subsistence hunting and fishing, as these comprise an important part of local culture and identity.

As of 1998, the First Nation ran an annual celebration called Cree Cultural Day, a two-day event in June with "cultural teachings and displays."

The roots rock band Midnight Shine was founded in 2011 and is led by a member of the Attawapiskat First Nation, Adrian Sutherland. The rest of the band are also from Western James Bay First Nations.

== Sports ==
Maytawaywin Authority provides recreational services at Reg Louttit Sportsplex, a community centre and sportsplex, including an ice rink, community hall, gym, and fields for football, soccer, and baseball.

== Government and politics ==
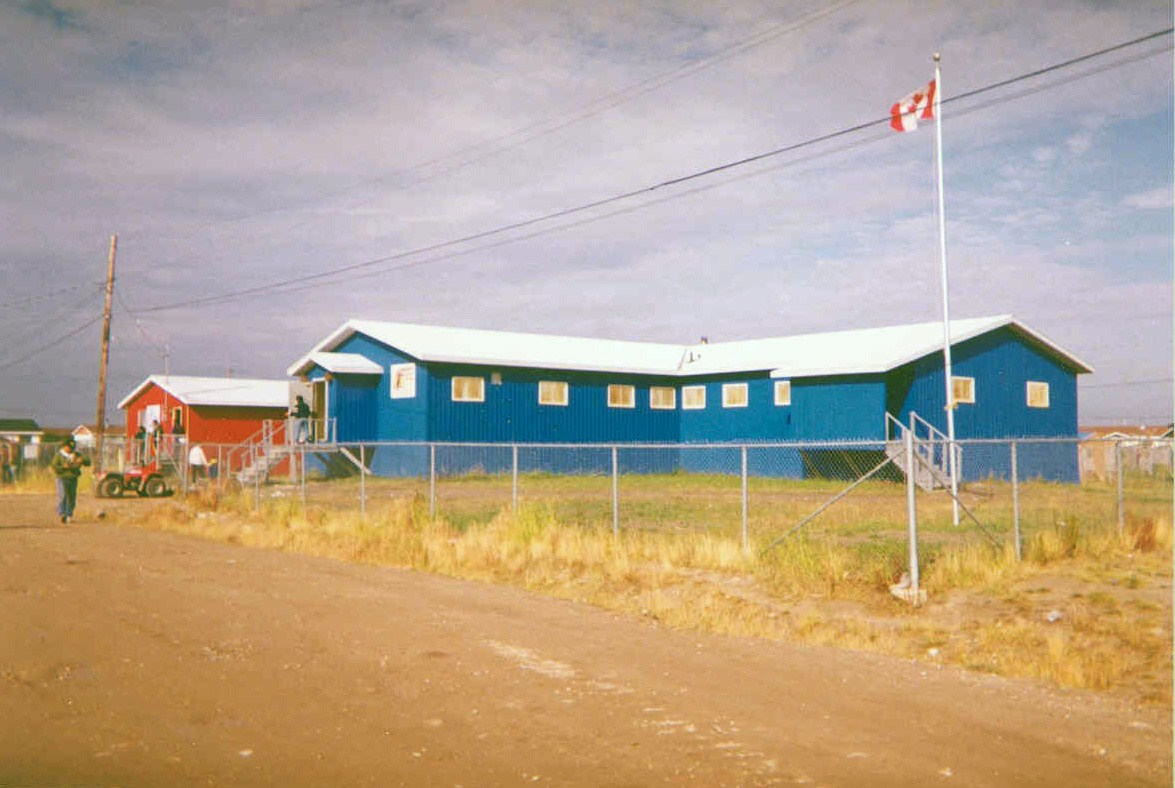
Attawapiskat First Nation Office, 1990s

The First Nation's government follows the template set forth in the Indian Act. Local leadership is an elected government of a chief, a deputy chief and twelve councillors who serve three-year terms. As of 2025, the current chief is Judy Sylvia Koostachin-Metatawabin.

Attawapiskat First Nation is part of the regional Mushkegowuk Council, an Aboriginal political group representing the Omushkego Cree. The community is also represented by the Nishnawbe Aski Nation (NAN), which represents 51 First Nations across Northern Ontario. NAN is the representative political body for the First Nations that are part of Treaty 9. The Assembly of First Nations (AFN) is the national representative organization of the hundreds of First Nation communities in Canada.

The reserve is within the federal riding of Kapuskasing—Timmins—Mushkegowuk, and the provincial riding of Mushkegowuk—James Bay.

=== Government history ===
The band government is elected following a custom election code, rather than using the electoral process laid out in the Indian Act.

The August 2025 election was the first band council election to allow all off-reserve members to vote. Off-reserve voting had been a matter of contention since at east the early 2010s. Members of the First Nation living off-reserve for a variety of reasons attempted to postpone the 2013 election until the council put in place a system to allow members living off-reserve to vote, citing the exorbitant cost of travel and the Supreme Court of Canada's 1999 decision in Corbiere v Canada (Minister of Indian and Northern Affairs), which ruled that the provision of the Indian Act restricting voting to on-reserve members was unconstitutional.

An updated custom election code had been drafted in 2010, but it was not ratified by chief Theresa Hall and the band council due to low turnout: only 74 of 2,166 eligible voters cast a ballot regarding the custom election code. A majority of those 74 voted in favour of it. This election code would have allowed off-reserve members of the Nation within a 600 km radius to vote in community elections, and would have replaced the earlier unwritten "traditional election code."

The band council was under Third Party Intervention for part of 2011–2012. While the federal government had preemptively removed the third-party manager, a Federal Court decision later deemed the Third Party Management arrangement 'unreasonable'.

=== Law ===
The band council sets by-laws for the community. The Attawapiskat Courthouse is administered by the Ontario Court of Justice occasionally, with hearings taking place in the Reg Louttit Sportsplex.

==== Police ====
Attawapiskat is policed by the Nishnawbe-Aski Police Service, an Aboriginal-based service that replaced the Ontario Provincial Police (OPP) in the early 1990s in most remote northern communities in Ontario. The community is served by the Attawapiskat detachment in the Northeast Region.

==== Attawapiskat Justice Pilot Project ====
From 1990 to 1993, the Attawapiskat Justice Pilot Project was initiated, which formed a three-member Cree-language Elders' Court to hear cases diverted from the provincial court. This project was done in an effort to increase community involvement with the court process and bolster the strength of Indigenous law in the community, and to respond to the council's concern about the number of community members being sentenced to jails outside the community. A report prepared in 1992 found mixed levels of community satisfaction with the implementation of the project, but enthusiasm to continue and improve it.

=== Military ===
Attawapiskat Canadian Ranger Patrol is a Canadian Ranger unit attached to the 3rd Canadian Ranger patrol group (based at CFB Borden) and was formed in 1994.

== Infrastructure ==
=== Transportation ===
==== Air ====
Travel to Attawapiskat is accessible through Attawapiskat Airport year-round. The airport was opened in 1974, but air service in the community began in 1957. The airport is equipped with a gravel runway that was constructed in the 1970s.

Around 2007, Thunder Airlines supplanted Air Creebec as supplier of postal services and for shipping goods. Heavier goods are shipped into the community via a seasonal barge from Moosonee.

==== Rail ====
The closest train station is in Moosonee, where the Ontario Northland Railway runs south to Cochrane, with bus connections further south to Toronto and Southern Ontario.

==== Road ====
Roads in town are not paved and are either dirt or gravel. Beyond the winter roads, none of the gravel roads connect beyond Attawapiskat. Roads are generally unnamed. Airport Road, River Road, Meenish Road, 1A Street and 2nd Street are the few named streets. Most places in town use post office boxes for identification.

Winter roads constructed every year link Attawapiskat First Nation with Kashechewan, Fort Albany, and Moosonee to the south. The first roads were built by the province in 1956. Winter roads are temporary routes of transportation that are constructed mostly in January, February, March and even April throughout remote parts of Northern Ontario. The James Bay Winter Road is operated or managed by Kimesskanemenow Corporation. The Ontario Ministry of Transportation has an office and representative in Attawapiskat.

When the winter road is in good condition, the trip can take five hours between Attawapiskat and Kashechewan. During the period when the winter road is open, certain community band members offer taxi services, shuttling between the communities. James Bay Winter Road is available in the winter months barring bad weather such as blizzards and heavy snowfalls, at which point access will be closed until the road is inspected and snow is plowed away.

Feasibility studies have been undertaken on the construction of a permanent all-season road between the coastal communities. Such a project, if undertaken, would entail a "coastal road" connecting the four communities (Attawapiskat, Kashechewan, Fort Albany, Moosonee) with each other, as well as a road to link the coastal road to the provincial highway system at Fraserdale, Kapuskasing or Hearst.

=== Utilities ===
==== Electricity ====
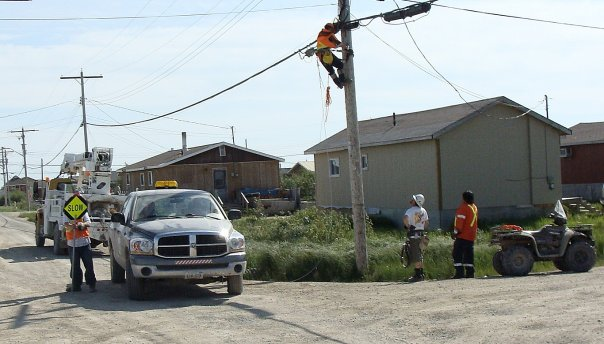
Fiber optics were installed in July 2009, providing high-speed Internet service and improved cable service to Attawapiskat

Five Nations Energy Inc was incorporated in 1997 and connected the community to the Hydro One electrical grid via the Moosonee Substation. FNEI remains the lead transmitter of the region. Prior to 2000, power was supplied by diesel generators located in Fort Albany.

==== Water ====
Prior to the 1970s, clean potable water from the Attawapiskat River and Monument Channel was obtained using buckets and pails. There was no running water.

When in 1976, Aboriginal Affairs and Northern Development Canada recommended that the community water supply should come not from the river but from a slough just northeast of the town, community members using traditional ecological knowledge were aware that the water intake site proposed was too high in organic material. They were right and no filtration system since then has proven adequate to control the quantities of organics without over-compensation with chemicals. Two consecutive treatment plants have failed, causing health problems.

In March 2012 there was a Health Canada advisory warning residents to "minimize their exposure to household tap water." Most residents therefore drank bottled water.

=== Healthcare ===
Basic health services are provided by nursing staff at the 15-bed Attawapiskat Hospital of the Weeneebayko Area Health Authority (WAHA), a provincial hospital which provides sixteen beds for pediatric, medical/surgical and chronic care. The hospital was founded in 1969, replacing St. Mary's Hospital, which had been established by the Catholic Church in 1951. Like other remote communities on the James Bay coast, there is no doctor located permanently in the community. A physician from Weeneebayko General Hospital in Moose Factory visits Attawapiskat and other communities along the coast on a regular basis each month. Patients with serious injuries, or those requiring surgery, must be transported to a larger centre for treatment. These emergency patients are transported by air ambulance airplane or helicopter to medical centres in Moose Factory, Timmins, Sudbury or Kingston, depending on their condition.

Attawapiskat Health Clinic provides additional outpatient health care services to the community and is located across the street from the hospital.

As with other places in town, the hospital has occasionally been evacuated due to the river flooding in the springtime, notably in spring of 2013.

A healing lodge is located 40 km (25 mi) away to the northwest of Attawapiskat. It is named after Jules Mattinas, who died at the age of 13 after sniffing gasoline. The lodge was opened in 1995. As of the 2011 housing crisis, the lodge had been in disrepair "for years," and the federal government's response to the crisis included funding to repair the building. A complete multi-year renovation of the building was completed in 2026 however the building is not yet in service. The building's entrance is shaped as a teepee.

Traditional midwifery practices have officially taken place in Attawapiskat since the Neepeeshowan Midwives began operation in December 2012, under the permission of WAHA. In 2015, their practice stopped due to WAHA's concerns about the lack of access to an operating room or blood products in the facilities in Attawapiskat. However, their practice resumed in March 2017 for low-risk births.

==== 2016 suicide crisis ====
According to reporting by CTV and CBC, more than one hundred people had attempted suicide in the community between September 2015 and April 2016, and one person died. Many young people attempted suicide during this time, which MP Charlie Angus called a "rolling nightmare." This crisis gained national attention when a state of emergency was declared after eleven people attempted suicide on April 9, 2016. A document signed by Chief Bruce Shisheesh and eight councillors indicated that there were twenty-eight suicide attempts during March 2016.

According to Chief Shisheesh, reasons for the many suicide attempts included overcrowding, bullying at school, the legacy of residential schools, and physical, sexual and drug abuse. Health Canada provided $340,860 for mental health and wellness programs and $9,750 for the National Aboriginal Youth Suicide Prevention Strategy, which the reserve claimed was inadequate. They said they were overwhelmed. Local hospitals, which were already in poor condition, struggled to treat the people attempting suicide, in addition to already ill patients. This led to the local jail being used as a temporary waiting location.

=== Emergency services ===
As of 2008, Attawapiskat Fire Rescue consisted of a fire department of nine.

Pre-hospital medical care is provided by Weeneebayko Area Health Authority Paramedic Services, a service run by Weeneebayko Area Health Authority funded by the Ministry of Health. The community is served by one EMS base with two ambulances for the entire community. There are eight primary care paramedics stationed at this base which operates 24/7/365.

=== Telecommunications ===
Telecommunications, including local television cable service is provided by Attawapiskat Development Corporation. Cable television first arrived in the community in the 1990s.

In March 2010, the Western James Bay Telecom Network announced it was launching a fibre-optic cable to connect Attawapiskat to high-speed internet, which would replace unreliable dial-up and satellite internet the community had used in the decades prior.

Telecommunications in the community is received from a tower located next to the hospital.

=== Housing crisis ===
Attawapiskat First Nation has a long-standing housing crisis, due to lack of adequate housing supply leading to overcrowding and health problems. The housing crisis is itself seen as the cause of other crises in the First Nation. In 2011, Chief Theresa Spence declared a state of emergency, which received widespread media attention. Since then, another state of emergency was declared in 2013 and the crisis has been the subject of several documentaries.

== Education ==
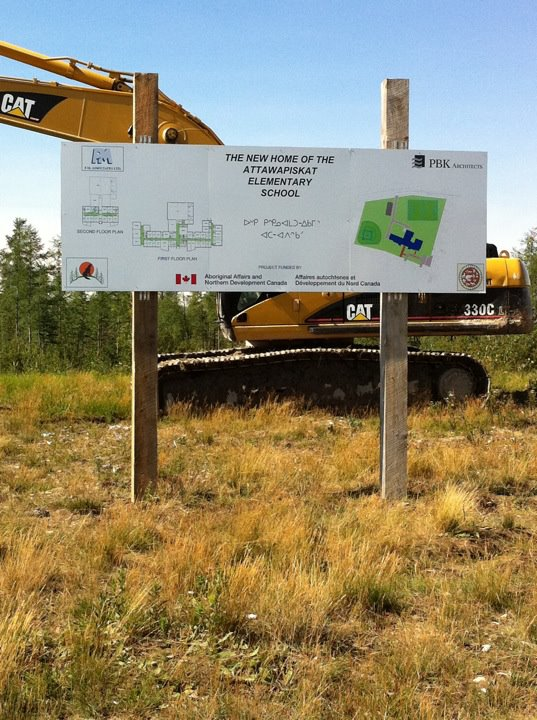
Kattawapiskak Elementary School's construction site in 2011 before construction began.

Secondary school students attend Vezina Secondary School, which was established in the early 1990s with additions built in following years. The secondary school was founded by John B. Nakogee in 1991 and it was named after Father Rodigue Vezina, a local Catholic priest who had served the community since 1975. Before the high school was opened in 1991, high school students had to go to Timmins, North Bay, or Ottawa for their studies.

On September 8, 2014, the new Kattawapiskak Elementary School was officially opened. This new construction followed the closure of the former elementary school in 2000 due to site contamination.

The lack of adequate school infrastructure in Attawapiskat was subject to much media attention in the 2000s and 2010s.

=== History ===
Beginning in 1902 when it opened, children from Attawapiskat attended St. Anne's Indian Residential School in Fort Albany.

The first school in Attawapiskat was built by missionaries. It initially operated as a summer school that was only open in July and August so that it would not interfere with traditional life. Attawapiskat School, designed in 1951 by Lennox Grafton, one of Canada's first female architects, opened in 1953.

Beginning in 1976, primary school students attended J.R. Nakogee School. It was closed on May 11, 2000, because of site contamination and possible health problems attributed to a massive diesel leak that had occurred in 1979. 30,000 gallons of diesel leaked from underground pipes, the largest such leak in Northern Ontario at the time. Classes subsequently took place in portables. Money that had been allocated for the renovation of the 25-year-old frame school was used to pay for construction of eight double and three single portable classrooms. The facilities were basic, with none of the supplementary resources available to schools in other parts of the province. A new school was promised by the Minister of Indian and Northern Affairs in the summer of 2000, but no action was taken for several years. On April 1, 2008, newly appointed Education Minister Chuck Strahl informed the Attawapiskat First Nation Education Authority that Ottawa would not finance the new school after all.

The Education Authority's Chairman summed up the community's plight by saying: "We just want what any other parent would want for their children – a safe school." Construction on a new elementary school began on June 22, 2012. Assembly of First Nations National Chief Shawn Atleo congratulated the community that day. It opened two years later.

Beginning in 2007, local teenager Shannen Koostachin launched "Education Is a Human Right", an activist campaign to publicize the lack of educational opportunities for First Nations youth. Koostachin was killed in a car accident near New Liskeard, where she was attending high school, in 2010. The campaign was subsequently renamed Shannen's Dream in her memory, and continues to operate. The campaign was the subject of Abenaki filmmaker Alanis Obomsawin's award-winning 2013 documentary film Hi-Ho Mistahey!

== Media ==
=== Radio ===
- FM 89.9 – CKMT, Wawatay Radio Network (relays CKWT-FM, Sioux Lookout)
- FM 101.5 – CBCA, CBC Radio One (relays CBCS-FM, Sudbury)
- FM 107.1 – CJBA-FM, First Nations Community Radio

=== Television ===
The community has up to 48 TV channels with local shows.

== Notable people ==
- Asivak Koostachin, actor
- Jules Koostachin, filmmaker
- Shannen Koostachin (1996–2010), youth activist
- Theresa Spence, chief (2010–2015)
