= Pipestone River Provincial Park =

Provincial park in Ontario, Canada

- IUCN category II (national park)
- Location within Ontario
- Location: Kenora District, Ontario, Canada
- Coordinates: 52°17′19″N 90°31′03″W
- Area: 97,375.00 ha (375.9670 sq mi)
- Designation: Waterway
- Established: 1989
- Named for: Pipestone River
- Governing body: Ontario Parks
- Website: www.ontarioparks.com/park/pipestoneriver

The Pipestone River Provincial Park is a provincial park in northern Ontario, Canada, roughly 200 kilometres (120 mi) north of Sioux Lookout. It is a non-contiguous linear waterway park that consists of 3 segments, protecting 316-kilometre-long (196 mi) portions of the Pipestone, Morris, Williams, and Otoskwin Rivers. The segments are separated by an unprotected portion of the Pipestone River at Kingfisher 2A reserve, and between Kecheokagan Lake and the Nord Road (formerly Highway 808). It was established on January 3, 1989, and provides backcountry whitewater canoeing and camping opportunities.

In addition to the 200-metre-wide (660 ft) waterway sections, the park also consists of a large tract of land between the Nord Road and Forester Lake, southeast of the Pipestone River and north of the Pineimuta River, that contains an extensive dune system east of the Agutua Moraine. The dunes, up to 15 metres (49 ft) in height, are nearly all parabolic in shape, oriented by the west wind. They are mostly static due to the vegetation. These dune fields and moraine, as well as the wide variety of bedrock elements, four major landscape types, and glacial and lacustrine landforms, are some of the notable features of the park.

The park includes the height-of-land between the Morris River and Williams Rivers. From Otoonabee Lake, water flows north and west via the Morris River to the Pipestone River. From Williams Lake, water flows east via the Williams River to the Otoskwin River.

Also in the park is Big Beaver House, a Hudson's Bay Company fur trading post and outpost that operated from 1911 to 1965. The post was established at Big Beaver Lake (now known as Misamikwash Lake) by William King Oman as an outpost in 1911 and became a full trading post in 1945. In 1948, a store and warehouse were built. It closed in 1965 and moved its business to Wunnummin Lake.

It is a non-operating park, meaning that there are no facilities or services. Visitors require extensive wilderness and whitewater skills.

At the crossing of the Nord Road at the Otoskwin River, the Pipestone River Provincial Park abuts the Otoskwin-Attawapiskat River Provincial Park that continues downstream along the Otoskwin and Attawapiskat Rivers.
