= Muketei River =

- Location of the river mouth in Ontario

Location
- Country: Canada
- Province: Ontario
- Region: Northwestern Ontario
- District: Kenora

Physical characteristics
- Source: Kitchie Lake
  - coordinates: 52°13′23″N 86°51′11″W
  - elevation: 214 m (702 ft)
- Mouth: Attawapiskat River
  - coordinates: 53°08′11″N 85°16′55″W
  - elevation: 102 m (335 ft)

Basin features
- River system: James Bay drainage basin

The Muketei River is a river in northeastern Kenora District in northwestern Ontario, Canada. It is in the James Bay drainage basin and is a left tributary of the Attawapiskat River.

The Muketei River begins at an unnamed lake and flows northeast then east to its mouth at the Attawapiskat River, which flows to James Bay.

== Sources ==
- "Muketei River" at Atlas of Canada. Accessed 2016-05-03.
- Map 18 (PDF) (Map). 1 : 1,600,000. Official road map of Ontario. Ministry of Transportation of Ontario. 2014.
