= Streatfeild Lake =

Lake in Ontario, Canada

- Location within Ontario
- Location: Kenora District, Ontario
- Coordinates: 52°08′37″N 85°54′19″W
- Primary outflows: Streatfeild River
- Basin countries: Canada
- Max. length: 6.9 kilometres (4.3 mi)
- Max. width: 3.7 kilometres (2.3 mi)
- Surface area: 20 square kilometres (8 sq mi)
- Shore length^{1}: 20 kilometres (12 mi)
- Surface elevation: 181 metres (594 ft)
- ^{1} Shore length is not a well-defined measure.

Streatfeild Lake is a lake in Kenora District, Ontario, Canada. It is the source of the Streatfeild River. The river lies in the Hudson Bay Lowlands.

== See also ==
- List of lakes in Ontario
