= James White (geographer) =

Canadian geographer (1863–1928)

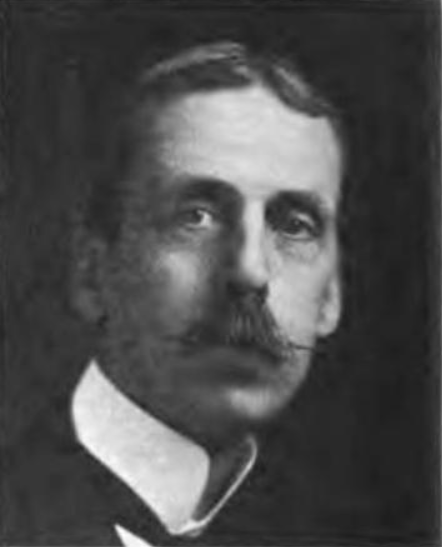
- Born: February 3, 1863; Ingersoll, Canada West
- Died: February 26, 1928 (aged 65); Ottawa
- Resting place: Beechwood Cemetery
- Occupation: Geographer
- Known for: Atlas of Canada

James White (February 3, 1863 – February 26, 1928) was a Canadian geographer. White studied geology at the Royal Military College of Canada in Kingston, Ontario. In 1883, he became the Geographer and Chief Draftsman for the Geological Survey of Canada. White and a team of 20 cartographers produced the first edition of the Atlas of Canada in 1906.

== Early life ==
James White was born in Ingersoll, Canada West, on 3 February 1863. He attended Atkins Private School, Ingersoll Collegiate Institute and went on to graduate from the Royal Military College in June 1883.

== Geographical work ==
In January 1884, White was employed as a topographer on a geological survey of Canada. Later that year and over the course of 1885 he surveyed the Rocky Mountains region, after which he continued his work in the gold district of Madoc, Ontario (1886), the phosphate district of Ottawa (1887–1890) and then the Kingston and Pembroke districts of Ontario (1891–1893).

After spending 1894 as the geological survey's geographer and chief draughtsman, White was appointed chief geographer of the department of the interior in 1899. He served on the Alaska boundary commission in 1903 and undertook an investigation into trans-Atlantic passenger steamships in 1906.

== Canadian sovereignty ==
White was interested in the concept of Canadian sovereignty, particularly as it affected claims to the Alaska boundary region. In 1904 he proposed that the Geographic Board of Canada counteract American naming of territory by referring to the area as Ellesmere Land.

== Commission of conservation ==
James White was appointed secretary of the Commission of Conservation in 1909. Canada was supplying countries such as Australia and America with wood, but by 1920, many Commonwealth countries were becoming concerned over a shortage in supply of wood and associated paper products. In his position with the Commission of Conservation, White emphasized that the Canadian forest resources were limited but also noted that the commission had no administrative powers and was not aligned with any particular political ideology.

White pointed out that Canada had "55 years' supply...at 1918 rates of consumption, and the rate...is increasing" and added that recent fires had destroyed twenty times as many trees as had been cut down for timber. He advocated a system of conservation designed to protect business as well as the environment, saying:

The only proper way to conserve any resource is to develop it to the point of highest productivity and with the maximum of efficiency, and to use every means to maintain its productivity. To withhold any natural resource from use under proper conditions...is waste in the grossest form.

He died in Ottawa on February 26, 1928.

== Awards and memberships ==
- Fellow of the Royal Geographical Society
- Member of the National Geographic Society
- Member of the Canadian Society of Civil Engineers
- Member of the Champlain Society
- Member of the American Academy of Political and Social Science

== Published works ==
- The topographical work of the Geological Survey of Canada (1897)
- Atlas of Canada (1906)
- Place-names in the Thousand Islands, St. Lawrence River (1910)
- Boundary disputes and treaties (1914)
- Dictionary of altitudes in the Dominion of Canada (1916)
- Place-names in the Rocky Mountains between the 49th parallel and the Athabaska River (1916)
- Fuels of western Canada and their efficient utilization (1918)
- Conservation in 1918 (1919)
- Power in Alberta; water, coal and natural gas (1919)

White is buried at Beechwood Cemetery, in Ottawa, Ontario, Canada.
