= Atikameg River =

- Location of the river mouth in Ontario

Location
- Country: Canada
- Province: Ontario
- Region: Northwestern Ontario
- District: Kenora

Physical characteristics
- Source: Unnamed lake
  - coordinates: 51°25′06″N 84°49′12″W
  - elevation: 163 m (535 ft)
- Mouth: Kapiskau River
  - coordinates: 52°29′50″N 82°45′14″W
  - elevation: 16 m (52 ft)

Basin features
- River system: James Bay drainage basin
- Tributaries
  - left: Poplar River
  - right: North Wabassie River, Little Swan River, Sagesigan River

The Atikameg River is a river in northeastern Kenora District in northwestern Ontario, Canada. It is in the James Bay drainage basin and is a right tributary of the Kapiskau River.

The Atikameg River begins at an unnamed lake and flows east, then northeast to its mouth at the Kapiskau River. The Kapiskau River flows to James Bay.

== Tributaries ==
- North Wabassie River (right)
- Little Swan River (right)
- Sagesigan River (right)
- Poplar River (left)

== Sources ==
- Map 17 (PDF) (Map). 1 : 1,600,000. Official road map of Ontario. Ministry of Transportation of Ontario. 2014.
