= Little Swan River (Ontario) =

- Location of the river mouth in Ontario

Location
- Country: Canada
- Province: Ontario
- Region: Northwestern Ontario
- District: Kenora

Physical characteristics
- Source: Unnamed swamp
  - coordinates: 51°47′51″N 83°33′39″W
  - elevation: 71 m (233 ft)
- Mouth: Atikameg River
  - coordinates: 52°02′03″N 83°15′22″W
  - elevation: 60 m (200 ft)

Basin features
- River system: James Bay drainage basin

The Little Swan River is a river in northeastern Kenora District in northwestern Ontario, Canada. It is in the James Bay drainage basin and is a right tributary of the Atikameg River.

The Atikameg River begins at an unnamed swamp and flows north to its mouth at the Atikameg River. The Atikameg River flows to James Bay.

== Sources ==
- Map 17 (PDF) (Map). 1 : 1,600,000. Official road map of Ontario. Ministry of Transportation of Ontario. 2014.
