= Beaver River (Kapiskau River tributary) =

- Location of the mouth of the Beaver River in Ontario

Location
- Country: Canada
- Province: Ontario
- Region: Central Ontario
- District: Kenora

Physical characteristics
- Source: Unnamed lake
  - coordinates: 52°32′14″N 83°03′52″W
  - elevation: 44 m (144 ft)
- Mouth: Kapiskau River
  - coordinates: 52°38′41″N 82°24′14″W
  - elevation: 4 m (13 ft)

Basin features
- River system: James Bay drainage basin

The Beaver River is a river in the far northeast of Kenora District in Northwestern Ontario, Canada. It is part of the James Bay drainage basin, and is a left tributary of the Kapiskau River.

== Course ==
The river begins at an unnamed lake and first heads north, then southeast. It then turns northeast, and reaches its mouth at the Kapiskau River, which flows to James Bay.

== Sources ==
- Map 17 (PDF) (Map). 1 : 1,600,000. Official road map of Ontario. Ministry of Transportation of Ontario. 2012-01-01.
