= Lennox Grafton =

Canadian architect

- Born: Daphne Lennox Grafton; 3 December 1919; Brooks, Alberta, Canada
- Died: 24 March 2017 (aged 97); Lacombe, Alberta, Canada
- Education: University of Toronto
- Known for: Architecture

Lennox Grafton (3 December 1919 – 24 March 2017) was a Canadian architect and one of the first women to be trained as architects in Canada. She completed her undergraduate education in University of Alberta between 1938 and 1941 and graduated from the architectural program in University of Toronto in 1950. Grafton's early works during the same decade focused on schools, churches, and commercial building. These works were complete while she worked in several of Toronto architectural firms. In 1960, she started her own architectural practice in Arnprior, Ontario. Work in the office included McNab Township offices, church hall, school in March Township and residential work. She closed the office in 1963 due to the lack of available funding to scale the business to acquire larger projects, and started teaching secondary school home economics.

Grafton joined Public Works Canada in 1967 and in the following decade was responsible for designing residential schools for the Canadian government most notably for Attawapiskat and Kashechewan in Northern Ontario. As a design and project architect, her work can be found in many communities throughout Ontario. Grafton indicated that the work with the government was "particularly interesting and demanding, and it required a lot of flexibility, energy and imagination". She was pivotal in the overall design the Attawapiskat school and overcoming the technical challenges of constructing the building posed by the location's soil structure, weather and temperature.

== Activism ==
During the 1980s and 1990s, Grafton actively participated in "For the Record", a project organized by the Ontario Women Graduates and funded by the Ontario Heritage Foundation, which sought to document women architects graduating from the University of Toronto architectural program between the 1920s and 1960s. She was on the editorial board of For Record from 1990 – 2006.
