= Theresa Spence =

Chief of the Attawapiskat First Nation

Chief Theresa Spence

Chief of the Attawapiskat First Nation
- In office August 27, 2010 – August 2015
- Preceded by: Theresa Hall

Deputy Chief of the Attawapiskat First Nation
- In office July 2007 – September 2010

Personal details
- Born: 1963 (age 62–63) Kenora District, Ontario, Canada

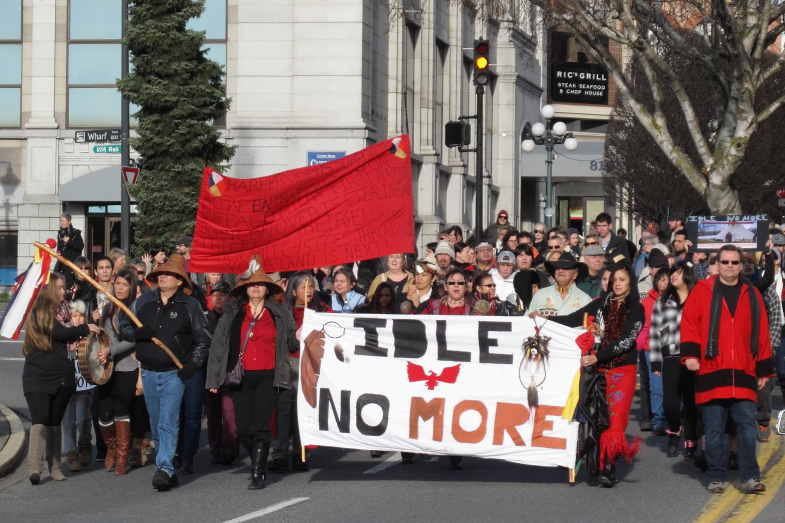
Idle No More protesters marching along Government Street on December 21, 2012.

Theresa Spence (born 1963) is a former chief of the Attawapiskat First Nation in Canada. She was a prominent figure in the Attawapiskat housing and infrastructure crisis, Idle No More, and other First Nations issues. Prior to serving as chief, she was the deputy chief of Attawapiskat.

== Attawapiskat housing and infrastructure crisis ==
As chief of Attawapiskat, Spence oversaw a $31.2 million annual operating budget. According to the most recent census, Attawapiskat has 1,549 people living on reserve.

The Attawapiskat reserve has been the subject of several state of emergency announcements by Spence in recent years, due to the reserve's poor housing conditions. The announcements have received national media coverage. On October 28, 2011, Spence called a state of emergency for the third time in three years. On December 30, 2012, a spokesperson for the Minister of Aboriginal Affairs stated that by the end of 2012–13, the federal government will have spent $131 million on the Attawapiskat reserve since 2006, including the construction of 60 new and renovated houses and a new school.

Controversy has grown around the question of how the money received from the federal government is spent or allocated by the reserve's own government. Financial records have never been made public to reserve residents or to the media; some residents of the reserve refused to discuss the matter with media, saying that they feared repercussions. The De Beers company, which owns a diamond mine nearby and employs around 60 residents of the reserve full-time, has donated trailers for housing to the reserve in the past. The Attawapiskat reserve's government receives a payment from De Beers, but Spence has declined to say how much or how it is spent.

Grand Chief Stan Louttit has criticized media coverage of the Attawapiskat reserve finances for misconstruing the true cost of living in remote locations such as Attawapiskat, which is significantly higher than more populated areas in southern regions of Canada. The Attawapiskat band council agreed to a comprehensive audit, the results of which are pending review by the Aboriginal Affairs Department and Health Canada. Attawapiskat had been placed under third party management by the federal government following the state of emergency declared by Spence in 2011. However, this arrangement was overturned by a court ruling.

A 2012 financial audit commissioned by the Government of Canada for the years found a lack of documentation to account for millions of dollars spent by the Attawapiskat Band Council between 2005 and 2011. When the audit was released to the public, Spence responded by accusing Canada of acting in bad faith. Other First Nations leaders, however, were critical of Spence's fiscal mismanagement as indefensible and undermining reserves that followed proper bookkeeping. The audit primarily covered the years prior to Spence becoming Chief.

Spence's combined salary and travel expenses amount to more than $71,000.

== Idle No More and hunger strike ==
On 11 December 2012 Spence declared a hunger strike. Her hunger strike consisted of a liquid diet of lemon water, medicinal teas, and fish broth— a historical survival diet for Indigenous communities facing poverty and food shortages from land loss and colonial policies, according to Anishinaabe scholar Leanne Betasamosake Simpson.

Various estimates of Spence's daily caloric intake were published, ranging from 50 to 400. According to the 1991 Declaration on Hunger Strikers (Declaration of Malta), hunger strikes and total fasts include the consumption of liquids and this is reflected in an article in the Journal of the American Medical Association on the treatment of hunger strikers.

Her protest was intended to focus public attention on First Nations issues, support the Idle No More indigenous rights movement, and highlight concerns about Bill C-45. Further, she stated her action "won't end until Prime Minister Stephen Harper and Gov. Gen. David Johnston agree to sit down and talk about Canada's treaty relationship with First Nations leadership." From a tipi on Victoria Island, near Parliament Hill in Ottawa, she issued a call for First Nation traditional women healers and other women, including Laureen Harper, the wife of the Prime Minister, to come and join her "to pray for Canada." Her protest attracted worldwide attention to the Idle No More movement and she became a unifying symbol to some Idle No More supporters. Attawapiskat also fully backed Spence.

A bank account for accepting direct donations was set up for Spence, which Spence's spokespersons indicated would be under the sole financial control of Spence's spouse, Clayton Kennedy, rather than the Attawapiskat band council. A columnist with Canadian news weekly magazine Maclean's questioned the propriety of the arrangement, as well as questioning who was authorized to speak publicly on behalf of Spence.

Minister of Aboriginal Affairs and Northern Development John Duncan sent a letter to Spence on December 25, 2012, expressing concern for her health and urging her to end her protest. Spence subsequently called for a day of protests in support of her cause to take place on December 30, 2012, bringing peaceful demonstrations in Toronto, Calgary, Vancouver, and other locations, while a VIA train was detained by demonstrators near Belleville, Ontario. Spence was visited by 21 senators and members of parliament representing opposition parties. Former Prime Minister Paul Martin met with Spence on January 5, 2013, calling her "an inspiration". Amnesty International issued a statement in her support and urged the Prime Minister to meet with Spence.

Shawn Atleo, national chief of the Assembly of First Nations, had met with Spence repeatedly and had tried to convince her to end her hunger strike, without success. On January 1, 2013, Atleo invited the Prime Minister to a January 24 meeting with First Nations leaders, but this date was rejected by Spence who said her health condition required a meeting within 72 hours. Spence's spokesperson stated that the hunger strike would not stop and could continue after January 11.

On January 4, 2013, the Office of the Prime Minister announced that a meeting would take place on January 11, 2013, between Harper and Duncan and a delegation of First Nation leaders, coordinated by the Assembly of First Nations, to follow up on issues discussed during the Crown-First Nations gathering that took place on January 24, 2012. A spokesperson for Spence initially stated that she would attend the meeting, but Spence later clarified her position and rejected the invitation, as Governor General David Johnston had declined to attend, while Ontario Premier Dalton McGuinty was unavailable.

Chief Spence ended her 6-week hunger strike on January 24, 2013. A Declaration of Commitment was prepared over the preceding couple of days, which committed federal opposition parties and the AFN to address the critical issues that affected the relationship between First Nations people and the Canadian Government, based on Nation-to-Nation treaties going back to the 18th century. At the meeting with the chiefs that occurred on January 11, 2013, Prime Minister Harper had already agreed to top-level talks to modernize and implement the ancient treaties that were always intended to bring peace and prosperity to First Nations.

Her hunger strike was covered in part by the 2015 documentary film After the Last River.

== Personal life ==
Spence has five daughters. Her common-law husband is Clayton Kennedy. Kennedy was previously hired by the band council to co-manage spending and monitor accounting procedures.

== Career ==
Spence has held numerous positions within the Attawapiskat government and its various organisations. She was elected Chief on August 27, 2010, but, prior to that, held positions as deputy chief, councillor, a member of the local development corporation, and manager of local daycare.
