= Ekwan River =

- Location of the mouth of the Ekwan River in Ontario.

Location
- Country: Canada
- Province: Ontario
- Region: Northwestern Ontario
- District: Kenora

Physical characteristics
- Source: Zumar Lake
  - coordinates: 52°20′31″N 87°12′13″W
  - elevation: 239 m (784 ft)
- Mouth: James Bay
  - coordinates: 53°12′00″N 82°14′59″W
  - elevation: 0 m (0 ft)
- Length: 500 km (310 mi)

Basin features
- River system: James Bay drainage basin
- Tributaries
  - left: Little Ekwan River, North Washagami River
  - right: Crooked River, Matateto River

The Ekwan River is a river in Kenora District in northwestern Ontario, Canada. It appears as Equam on Bellin map of 1744. Ekwan River is of Cree origin, meaning "the river far up the coast". It travels about 500 kilometres (311 mi) from its source at Zumar Lake on the Canadian Shield, through the Hudson Bay Lowlands, northeast and then east, to its mouth on James Bay.

== Course ==
The Ekwan drainage basin lies between and is enveloped by the larger ones of neighbouring rivers, the Winisk River on the north and the Attawapiskat River on the south. The source of the river is Zumar Lake at an elevation of 239 metres (784 ft), just 8 kilometres (5 mi) northeast of part of the North Channel outlet from Attawapiskat Lake, the source of the Attawapiskat River. It travels northeast over a series of rapids and falls, taking in various small tributaries, to a confluence point at 53°10′43″N 86°13′30″W at an elevation of 134 metres (440 ft), where an unnamed tributary, which begins at a point 52°55′58″N 86°14′06″W within 2 kilometres (1.2 mi) of the Attawapiskat River, joins from the right.

The river continues northeast to take in the North Washagami River from the left at an elevation of 81 metres (266 ft) then on to its point furthest north at 53°50′17″N 84°47′15″W, before turning southeast for 50 kilometres (31 mi). Then, within 5 kilometres (3 mi), three named tributaries join: the Matateto River from the right; the Crooked River from the right; and the Little Ekwan River from the left. They join at an elevation of about 70 metres (230 ft). The Ekwan River continues east southeast for 160 kilometres (99 mi), passing over the Flint Rapids at 53°29′41″N 83°39′32″W at an elevation of 63 metres (207 ft), before reaching its mouth at sea level at the Akimiski Strait on James Bay, across from the western tip of Akimiski Island, about 25 kilometres (16 mi) north of the mouth of the Attawapiskat River.

Discharge measurements taken for 28 years to 1995 below the confluence point of the North Washagami River at a point near 53.80°N 84.92°W showed a high mean monthly discharge of 328.321 cubic metres (11,594.547 cu ft) per second in May and a low of 6.179 cubic metres (218.209 cu ft) per second in March.

== Economy ==
Mining exploration has taken place on the upper reaches of the river.

== Tributaries ==
- Little Ekwan River (left)
- Crooked River (right)
- Matateto River (right)
- North Washagami River (left)

== See also ==
- List of rivers of Ontario
