= Ozhiski Lake =

Lake in Ontario, Canada

- Location within Ontario
- Location: Kenora District, Ontario
- Coordinates: 51°58′50″N 88°31′08″W
- Primary inflows: Otoskwin River
- Primary outflows: Otoskwin River
- Basin countries: Canada
- Max. length: 35 km (22 mi)
- Max. width: 3.2 km (2 mi)
- Surface elevation: 272 m (892 ft)

Ozhiski Lake is a lake in northern Kenora District, Ontario, Canada.

This name is probably from Ojibwa ajishki, meaning "mud, dirt, mire" (Baraga 1880), azhashki "mud" (Nichols and Nyholm 1979).

Ozhiski Lake is about 35 kilometres (22 mi) long and about 3.2 kilometres (2 mi) at its widest point. This lake lies across the 52nd parallel north, and occupies an east-west orientation with a broad arm leading off to the northeast.

== See also ==
- List of lakes in Ontario
