= Missisa Lake =

Lake in Ontario, Canada

- Location in Ontario
- Location: Kenora District, Ontario
- Coordinates: 52°19′08″N 85°11′35″W
- Primary outflows: Missisa River
- Basin countries: Canada
- Max. length: 22 km (14 mi)
- Max. width: 13 km (8.1 mi)
- Surface elevation: 170 m (560 ft)

Missisa Lake is a lake in northeastern Kenora District in northwestern Ontario, Canada. It is in the James Bay drainage basin and is the source of the Missisa River, which begins at the southeast of the lake.

== See also ==
- List of lakes in Ontario
