= Kapiskau River =

- Location of the mouth of the Kapiskau River in Ontario

Location
- Country: Canada
- Province: Ontario
- Region: Central Ontario
- District: Kenora

Physical characteristics
- Source: Unnamed lake
  - coordinates: 52°03′18″N 85°39′29″W
  - elevation: 194 m (636 ft)
- Mouth: James Bay
  - coordinates: 52°46′10″N 81°58′13″W
  - elevation: 0 m (0 ft)

Basin features
- River system: Hudson Bay drainage basin
- Tributaries
  - left: Beaver River
  - right: Otadaonanis River, Atikameg River, Noluskatsi River

The Kapiskau River is a river in the far northeast of Kenora District in Northwestern Ontario, Canada. It is a tributary of James Bay.

== Course ==
The river begins at an unnamed lake, about 50 kilometres (31 mi) northeast of Ogoki Post (Marten Falls First Nation) and adjacent to the Streatfeild River drainage basin, and first heads north, then east, then southeast to Kapiskau Lake. It continues southeast and then east before turning north to take in the right tributary Noluskatsi River. The river heads northeast, and takes in the right tributary Atikameg River and left tributary Beaver River. It continues northeast, takes in the right tributary Otadaonanis River just before the river mouth, then reaches its mouth at James Bay.

== Watershed ==
The Kapiskau River and the Lawashi River are the two river systems (the former the southerly and the latter the northerly) that lie in between the larger Attawapiskat River to the north and the Albany River to the south.

== Natural history ==
The mouth of the Kapiskau River is part of the "Albany River Estuary and Assoc. Coastline" (CA368) Important Bird Area.

== Geology ==
Portions of the headwaters of the Kapiskau River and its tributaries lie within the southeastern edge of the Northern Ontario Ring of Fire.

== Economy ==
The James Bay Winter Road that connects Moosonee and Attawapiskat crosses the Kapiskau River.

== Tributaries ==
- Otadaonanis River (right)
- Beaver River (left)
- Pekwako River (left)
- Atikameg River (right)
- Noluskatsi River (right)

== Sources ==
- Map 17 (PDF) (Map). 1 : 1,600,000. Official road map of Ontario. Ministry of Transportation of Ontario. 2012-01-01.
