= Attawapiskat kimberlite field =

Volcanic field in Ontario, Canada

The Attawapiskat kimberlite field is a field of kimberlite pipes located astride the Attawapiskat River in the Hudson Bay Lowlands, in Northern Ontario, Canada. It is thought to have formed about 180 million years ago in the Jurassic period when the North American Plate moved westward over a centre of upwelling magma called the New England hotspot, also referred to as the Great Meteor hotspot.

Since June 26, 2008, the De Beers open pit Victor Diamond Mine has been in operation mining two pipes in the field at 52°49′14″N 83°53′00″W, about 90 kilometres (56 mi) west of the community of Attawapiskat. The mine was expected to produce 600,000 carats (120 kg) of diamonds a year.

== See also ==
- Volcanism of Canada
- Volcanism of Eastern Canada
- List of volcanoes in Canada
- List of volcanic fields
