= Lawashi River =

- Location of the mouth of the Lawashi River in Ontario

Location
- Country: Canada
- Ontario: Ontario
- Region: Northwestern Ontario
- District: Kenora
- Part: Kenora, Unorganized

Physical characteristics
- Source: Unnamed lake
  - coordinates: 52°13′33″N 84°30′54″W
  - elevation: 147 m (482 ft)
- Mouth: James Bay
  - coordinates: 52°52′58″N 82°10′26″W
  - elevation: 0 m (0 ft)

Basin features
- River system: James Bay drainage basin
- Tributaries
  - left: Lawashi Channel

The Lawashi River is a river in Unorganized Kenora District in Northwestern Ontario, Canada. The river is a tributary of James Bay.

== Course ==
The river begins at an unnamed lake and heads east then northeast. It takes in the left tributary Lawashi Channel arriving from the Attawapiskat River 8.5 kilometres (5.3 mi) upstream from the river mouth, and reaches its mouth at James Bay, approximately 11 kilometres (7 mi) southeast of the mouth of the Attawapiskat River.

== Tributaries ==
- Lawashi Channel

== See also ==
- List of rivers of Ontario
