= Victor Diamond Mine =

Canadian diamond mine in Ontario

Victor Mine
- Location in Ontario
- Location: 90 km (56 mi) west of Attawapiskat, Ontario, Canada; 52°49′01″N 083°54′23″W
- Products: Diamonds
- Discovered: 1995
- Opened: 2008
- Closed: 2019
- Company: De Beers
- Website: www.debeersgroup.com/canada/en/operations/mining/victor-mine.html

The Victor Mine was the first Canadian diamond mine located in Ontario, and De Beers' second diamond mine in Canada (after the Snap Lake Diamond Mine). It is located in the Northern Ontario Ring of Fire, in the James Bay Lowlands 90 kilometres (56 mi) west of Attawapiskat in the remote northern part of the province. In June 2005, the Attawapiskat First Nation voted in favour (85.5%) of ratifying the Impact Benefit Agreement (IBA). Construction of the mine began in February 2006 which created 3200 positions; mining and operations will create around 400 permanent positions. The Victor Mine is an open-pit mine, with a processing plant, workshops, and an airstrip located on site. By 2013–2014 royalties collected from De Beers Victor Mine amounted to $226. At that time De Beers was continuing to pay off its "$1 billion investment to build the mine and from now until it closes, the company expects to pay tens of millions of dollars in royalties." The mine completed mining and processing in 2019 and has moved to a shut-down phase including demolition of infrastructure and rehabilitation of the site.

== History ==
De Beers started looking for Kimberlite Pipes within Canada in the 1960s. "The Victor Mine was developed within a cluster of 16 kimberlite pipes that were discovered in the James Bay Lowlands near Attawapiskat in 1987." In 1995 the pipes of the James Bay Lowland area were re-examined and interest was renewed in the Victor Mine Project. The cost feasibility of mining Victor diamonds was done in 2002. In 2005, the Project gained approval after an environmental assessment by the Federal and Provincial government and soon after construction began. In 2007, the Moose Cree First Nations peoples signed in favour of the Victor mine and the first successful productions of diamonds began. June 20, 2008, Victor Mine entered the production phase. De Beers celebrated its opening July 26 and reached an agreement with the Government of Ontario to allow up to 10% of the mine's production to be available to the cutting and polishing industry in Ontario. In October 2009, the Victor Mine was voted “Mine of the year” by readers of the international trade publication called Mining Magazine.

== Geology ==
The area is composed of 18 kimberlite pipes of the Attawapiskat kimberlite field, 16 of which are diamondiferous; the Victor Mine sits on top of the Victor pipe and mines from Victor Main and Victor Southwest which have appeared close enough to the surface to be used in an open-pit mine. The Victor Kimberlite is a composition of pyroclastic crater facies and hypabyssal facies, and is considered to have a highly variable diamond grade.

== Mining ==
It is an open-pit mine; the equipment there is 100 tonne trucks, large front-end loaders, bulldozers and other necessary support equipment used in the mining operation. The annual production rate is 2.7 million tonnes a year, which comes to about 600,000 carats a year in diamond grade.

== Operations ==
There is year-round access via air travel and only seasonal access over land depending on whether the weather permits travel. On the property are warehouses for storage, a processing plant, workshops, offices, fuel storage facilities, pit-dewatering machinery and an airstrip (the Victor Mine Aerodrome) for travel needs. The site also has recreational and dorm buildings for the permanent staff. The life of the mine is expected to be twelve years and the total project life is seventeen years and each year the processing plan is designed to treat 2.5 million tonnes of kimberlite per year (roughly 7100 tonnes a day).

The pits exploited by the mine are seen, as is the small "village" to the bottom.

Tom Ormsby, director of external and corporate affairs for De Beers Canada claims that the great colour (whiteness), natural shapes, clearness and quality of the Victor diamonds ranks them with the highest stones in the world.

"Victor is forecasted to have a 17-year cradle-to-grave life. That includes construction, an estimated 12 years of operation and then winding down to closure and rehabilitation of the site."

== Performance ==
The mine had produced at a high level of performance leading to "[f]urther exploration of the site" with the "hope that De Beers will uncover another source of diamonds within close proximity of the existing operation." 826,000 carats were mined at Victor Mine in 2010 and "$93 million was spent on goods and services and $49 million (53 per cent) was supplied by Aboriginal businesses."

"No corporate, federal, provincial taxes or government royalties other than personal income taxes were paid in 2010 as the company was in a loss position for tax purposes." However, De Beers Canada "injected approximately $474,900,000 into the Canadian economy in 2010" through both mines, Snap Lake and Victor Mines.

In 2011, De Beers paid total wages and benefits of about $55.5 million to Victor employees. According to the Ontario Mining Association, in 2011 "$101 million was spent on goods and services" by De Beers "with about $57 million, or 57%, being provided by Aboriginal businesses."

== Exploration ==
Tom Ormsby, claimed that "The high quality of the Victor diamonds and the vastness of the Canadian shield points to great potential for another diamond mine being developed in northeastern Ontario." The "Canadian Shield has great potential to host diamonds" and potential in Canada "appears to be at least twice as good as what southern Africa has held for potential for diamonds."

"There are approximately eight years remaining on the forecast life of mine for Victor. In efforts to keep things going and extend this time frame, advanced exploration is currently underway at Victor on 15 previously identified diamond-bearing kimberlite pipes."

== Environmental and human concerns ==
So far, De Beers Canada employees and its contract partners have safely worked more than four million hours without a Lost Time Injury. Other human concerns are the mine's impact on the First Nations people and the company's pledge to help promote community growth will affect certain communities more than others.

Concerns were brought up regarding the mine's impact on the surrounding area. Since it is an open pit mine it would disturb the natural environment. The impact area is 5,000 hectares of land. The first concern was raised in 2005, when environmental groups called on the Ontario government to perform its own environmental impact assessment aside from the Federal one as it was believed the Federal assessment did not fully assess the situation, including long term harm on the wildlife, wilderness and the water systems found there. However, the Project did receive an ISO 14001 certification.

The environmental assessment process was later criticized for its restricted scope, namely for focusing primarily on the Attawapiskat First Nation, and largely excluding other potentially affected First Nations.

== Attawapiskat First Nation ==
The mine is on the traditional land of the Attawapiskat First Nation. An Impact-Benefit Agreement (IBA) was signed with community leaders in 2005 with Danny Metatawabin, acting as coordinator for the Impact-Benefit Agreement (IBA) between De Beers and Attawapiskat. Community members later protested the agreement through demonstrations and roadblocks claiming that the community's share of the "bounty from the mine isn't getting back to the community." De Beers has negotiated a lease area. Although it is acknowledged that the mine is on Attawapiskat traditional land, the royalties from Victor Mine flow to the Government of Ontario, not Attawapiskat First Nation. As of 2015, De Beers was paying up to $2 million per year to Attawapiskat. That payment is split between a trust fund controlled by the chief and council and the rest, which is used for community development and to pay Attawapiskat members who manage the band’s impact benefit agreement with De Beers, says Attawapiskat member Charlie Hookimaw.

The trust fund now totals $13 million. In 2014, the community received about $1 million; $480,000 went to business relations and $545,868 was spent on community development, Hookimaw says. They have 500 full-time employees with 100 from Attawapiskat First Nation. De Beers also employs Attawapiskat First Nation in winter road construction. The "mine employs 100 people from Attawapiskat at any one time. It generates about $400 million in annual revenue for the company." Sub-contractors from Attawapiskat First Nation also work for the mine.

"A federal review of the relationship between De Beers' Victor mine and Attawapiskat showed that government support for training and capacity did not start soon enough to deal with the huge lack of skills in the First Nation."

"Training is carried out on a year-round basis at the Victor Mine site as well as at the De Beers Canada Training Facility in Attawapiskat."

== See also ==
- De Beers
- List of diamond mines
- Lake Timiskaming kimberlite field
- Northern Ontario
