= Attawapiskat Lake =

Lake in Ontario, Canada

- Location within Ontario
- Location: Kenora District, Ontario
- Coordinates: 52°14′36″N 87°53′51″W
- Primary inflows: Otoskwin River, Marten-Drinking River, Pineimuta River
- Primary outflows: Attawapiskat River, North Channel
- Basin countries: Canada
- Surface area: 281 square kilometres (108 sq mi)
- Shore length^{1}: 596 kilometres (370 mi)
- ^{1} Shore length is not a well-defined measure.

Attawapiskat Lake (/ˌætəˈwɑːpɪskæt/) is a lake in Kenora District, Ontario, Canada. The primary inflows are the Otoskwin River, the Marten-Drinking River and the Pineimuta River. The two outflows are the Attawapiskat River and the North Channel, which itself flows into the Attawapiskat River.

The First Nations community of Neskantaga (also known as Lansdowne House) is located on the west side of the lake.

The name of the lake comes from a region through which the Attawapiskat River flows less than 100 kilometres (62 mi) from its mouth, where it has carved out several clusters of high limestone islands, nicknamed by canoeists the "Birthday Cakes". The formations are unique to the region, the Swampy Cree (Omushkegowuk) word for which, tawâpiskâ (as "kâh-tawâpiskâk" in its Conjunct form and as "êh-tawâpiskât" in its Participle form), gives name to the river and hence the lake.

Most of its shores and some of its islands are protected in the Otoskwin–Attawapiskat River Provincial Park.

== Geography ==
Attawapiskat Lake is the largest body of water along the Attawapiskat River. This lake is about 48 kilometres (30 mi) long by about 16 kilometres (10 mi) wide at its widest, with its axis oriented almost east and west, but it is deeply indented with long bays extending in all directions. Its surface is broken by many islands.

Attawapiskat Lake has two outlets, one at its eastern end and the other at the extremity of a bay extending to the northeast. The streams from these outlets run in a generally easterly direction for about 48 kilometres (30 mi) before merging.

== History ==
Attawapiskat Lake was historically part of the Attawapiskat and Otoskwin Rivers trade route, used by indigenous Anishnawbe and European fur traders.

In 1814, the first Hudson's Bay Company post was founded on the lake by George Budge. The post, located on a long peninsula in the middle of the lake, was originally a wintering outpost, called Attawapiskat or Attawapuskit (Lake) Post. Although the HBC's district manager's house and a watch house were built on the site, the post was abandoned in 1817. It was reestablished in 1820, but abandoned again a year later.

To draw business away from independent traders on Eabamet Lake, the HBC reopened the Attawapiskat Post as an outpost of Fort Hope in 1890, renamed to Lansdowne House in 1927 when it became a full trading post. In 1959, the HBC post became part of its Northern Stores Department. HBC divested this department in 1987 to The North West Company.

In the early 1990s, the First Nation that lived at Lansdowne House was relocated to the new community of Neskantaga, built on the shores of Attawapiskat Lake's southwestern end.

== See also ==
- List of lakes of Ontario
