= Attawapiskat River =

Attawapiskat River Kâh-tawâpiskâk
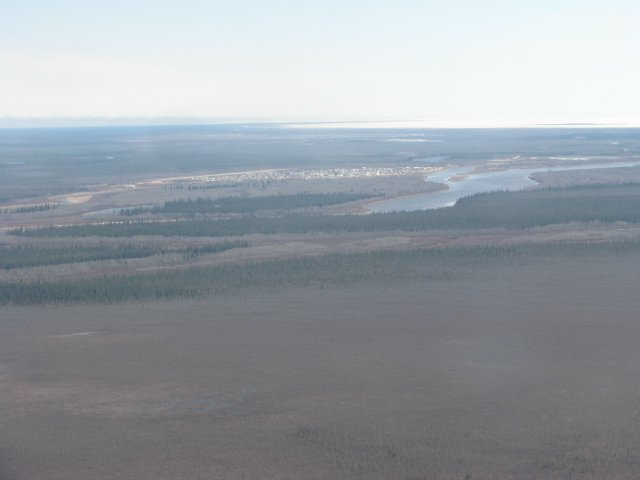

- Location of the mouth of the Attawapiskat River in Ontario.
- Etymology: From the Swampy Cree (Omushkegowuk) tawâpiskâ (Gap Between the Rocks)
- Native name: Êh-tawâpiskât sîpiy (Swampy Cree)

Location
- Country: Canada
- Province: Ontario
- Region: Northwestern Ontario
- District: Kenora

Physical characteristics
- Source: Attawapiskat Lake
  - coordinates: 52°09′32″N 87°35′45″W
  - elevation: 241 m (791 ft)
- Mouth: Akimiski Strait, James Bay
  - coordinates: 52°58′00″N 82°15′40″W
  - elevation: 0 m (0 ft)
- Length: 748 km (465 mi)
- Basin size: 50,500 km^{2} (19,500 sq mi)
- Discharge
  - average: 626 m^{3}/s (22,100 cu ft/s)

Basin features
- River system: James Bay drainage basin
- Tributaries
  - left: North Channel, Muketei River
  - right: Missisa River, Streatfeild River

The Attawapiskat River (/ˌætəˈwɑːpɪskæt/) is a river in Kenora District in northwestern Ontario, Canada, that flows east from Attawapiskat Lake to James Bay. It is the third largest river entirely in Ontario.

The Otoskwin–Attawapiskat River Provincial Park includes parts of the river from Attawapiskat Lake to a point just upstream of the confluence with the Muketei River.

== Geography ==
The Attawapiskat River travels a distance of 748 kilometres (465 mi) from the head of Bow Lake, and has a drainage area of 50,500 square kilometres (19,498 sq mi). It is the third largest river entirely in Ontario.

The source of the river is Attawapiskat Lake at an elevation of 241 metres (791 ft). The main rivers flowing into the lake that are thus part of the Attawapiskat River drainage basin are the Marten-Drinking River, the Otoskwin River and the Pineimuta River.

There are two outflows from the Attawapiskat Lake into the Attawapiskat River: a southern and a northern channel. The southern channel is named by the Atlas of Canada as the Attawapiskat River, and is the source location listed in the Infobox at right. The northern channel is named by the Atlas of Canada as the North Channel, and is the more easily navigated route for canoeing. The North Channel outflow from Attawapiskat Lake is at 52°11′35″N 87°28′35″W and consists of two short streams that lead into Windsor Lake. The elevation of the river drops significantly along these two outflow channels, descending from the higher ground of the Canadian Shield to the flatter and more boggy Hudson Bay Lowlands. After a series of rapids, the North Channel rejoins the Attawapiskat River (the southern channel) at 52°06′04″N 87°06′07″W at an elevation of 210 metres (689 ft).

The river continues east, and makes a bend to the north at Pym Island at 52°12′20″N 86°19′28″W at an elevation of 174 metres (571 ft). The Streatfeild River joins from the right at an elevation of 148 metres (486 ft), and the outlet river from McFaulds Lake, centre of the Northern Ontario Ring of Fire geological area, joins from the left 17 kilometres (11 mi) further downstream at 52°48′10″N 85°54′45″W at an elevation of 139 metres (456 ft). Further downstream, the river then heads east once again. The Muketei River joins the Attawapiskat from the left at 53°08′36″N 85°17′38″W at an elevation of 105 metres (344 ft), and the Missisa River joins from the right 28 kilometres (17 mi) further downstream at 53°01′36″N 84°54′02″W at an elevation of 98 metres (322 ft).

At 52°56′32″N 83°10′10″W at an elevation of 30 metres (98 ft) the Lawashi Channel begins and takes part of the Attawapiskat's flow into the Lawashi River at a point 8.5 kilometres (5.3 mi) upstream of that river's mouth at James Bay. The mouth of the Lawashi River is approximately 11 kilometres (7 mi) southeast of the mouth of the Attawapiskat. After the Lawashi Channel branching, the main river continues east, past the community of Attawapiskat 10 kilometres (6 mi) upstream from the mouth, and exits into the James Bay at the Akimiski Strait, across from Akimiski Island.

=== Tributaries ===
- Missisa River (right)
- Muketei River (left)
- Streatfeild River (right)
- North Channel (left)
- Attawapiskat Lake (source)
  - Otoskwin River
  - Marten-Drinking River
  - Pineimuta River

== History ==
The Attawapiskat River has been a central route for travel, hunting, and trade for the Mushkegowuk since time immemorial.

In 1886, Dr. Robert Bell travelled the length of the River from Attawapiskat Lake to James Bay and published about it in the Annual Report of that year's Geological Survey.^{:8}

== Geology ==
Less than 100 kilometres (62 mi) from its mouth, the Attawapiskat has carved out several clusters of high limestone islands, nicknamed by canoeists the "Birthday Cakes". The formations are unique to the region, the Swampy Cree (Omushkegowuk) word for which, tawâpiskâ (as "kâh-tawâpiskâk" in its Conjunct form and as "êh-tawâpiskât" in its participle form), gives the river its name, At-a-wa-pis-kat-sipi, also translated as "gorge stone river."^{:52}

The Attawapiskat kimberlite field lies astride the river.

== Economy ==
Between 2008 and 2019, the De Beers Victor Diamond Mine, in the Attawapiskat kimberlite field, operated near the river about 90 kilometres (56 mi) west of the community of Attawapiskat.

When it opened, the mine was expected to produce 600,000 carats (120 kg) of diamonds a year.

== See also ==
- List of longest rivers of Canada
- List of rivers of Ontario

== Sources ==
- "Toporama". Atlas of Canada. Natural Resources Canada. Archived from the original on February 10, 2010.
- "Map sheet 17" (PDF). Official Road Map of Ontario. Ontario Ministry of Transportation. 2009-01-30.
