= Atlas of Canada =

Online atlas devoted to Canada

The Atlas of Canada (French: L'Atlas du Canada) is an online atlas published by Natural Resources Canada that has information on every city, town, village, and hamlet in Canada. The maps concern themselves with five themes: climate and environment, communication and transportation, energy and economy, land and water, and people and places. It was originally a print atlas, with its first edition being published in 1906 by geographer James White and a team of 20 cartographers. Much of the geospatial data used in the atlas is available for download and commercial re-use from the Atlas of Canada site or from NRCan Open S&T Repository (OSTR).
