= Mid-Canada Line Site 050 Fort Albany =

Air defence network relay station

- Part of Mid-Canada Line
- Fort Albany, Ontario, Canada

Site information
- Controlled by: Royal Canadian Air Force
- Condition: Remediated

Location
- Location of MCL Site 050
- Coordinates: 52.210°N 81.668°W

Site history
- Built by: Royal Canadian Air Force
- In use: 1957–1965
- Demolished: 2010

Mid-Canada Line Site 050 Fort Albany was a part of the Mid-Canada Line air defence network. During the late 1950s, the Mid-Canada Line (MCL) was developed as a secondary line of detection in case enemy aircraft penetrated the Distant Early Warning Line. This consisted of approximately 90 unmanned sites and eight Sector Control Stations located along the 55th parallel. Each site sent out a radio beam to its neighbouring site. If an aircraft interrupted the beam, an intruder alarm would sound.

Fort Albany was chosen as a relay station for signals coming in from the Sector Control Site at RCAF Station Winisk and would retransmit those signals to Mid-Canada Line Site 060 Relay via tropospheric scatter (troposcatter).

MCL Site 050 ceased operations as a troposcatter repeater in April 1965 when the Mid-Canada Line was no longer economically feasible or required due to improvements in technology.

The site was remediated in 2010 when all contaminated soil was removed from the area after it was determined the site was contaminated with PCBs and hydrocarbons.
