= Peawanuck =

- Indian settlement
- Peawanuck Indian Settlement
- Location within Ontario
- Coordinates: 55°1′N 85°25′W
- Country: Canada
- Province: Ontario
- District: Kenora
- First Nation: Weenusk

Area
  - Land: 3.48 km^{2} (1.34 sq mi)

Population (2016)
  - Total: 195
  - Density: 56/km^{2} (150/sq mi)
- Postal Code(s): P0L 2H0
- Area Code(s): 807 but 705 is used

Peawanuck is an isolated Cree community in the Kenora District, Ontario, Canada. It is located near the confluence of the Winisk and Shamattawa rivers, about 35 km from the Winisk River's end in Hudson Bay. Its population is 237.

Its population used to live in the community of Winisk (55°16′N 85°11′W), near the mouth of the Winisk River. This also used to be a Mid-Canada Line Radar site. In 1986, its population was forced to abandon Winisk as a result of the Winisk Flood Disaster. The community was relocated thirty kilometres up-river on higher ground. The new settlement was renamed Peawanuck, meaning "flintstone" in the Cree language. It only took seven months for the community to be rebuilt in Peawanuck, with much credit going to the community members who were determined to have their new homes ready by the winter. It is surrounded by lands of the Polar Bear Provincial Park providing Peawanuck with limited tourism opportunities. It lies at similar latitudes to Ketchikan, Prince Rupert, Glasgow, Edinburgh and Moscow but has much harsher winters than those other cities.

== Transportation ==
Peawanuck is not accessible by year-round road but has an airfield (Peawanuck Airport). Marked roads exists for travel within Peawanuck. While the roads have no names, the main road in town is referred to as Main Street and the one along the river as Riverside.

There are private cars or light trucks in town, but other modes of travel include snowmobiles and canoe.

The town is linked by winter/ice roads in the winter towards Fort Severn, Ontario, and ultimately, Shamattawa, Manitoba and Gillam, Manitoba.

== Emergency Services ==
Peawanuck has no hospitals, and is only served by one of two Health Canada funded Weeneebayko Area Health Authority Partnership Sites. The Peawanuck Nursing station provides basic health care needs in the community. It is federally run by Health Canada's First Nation and Inuit Branch, and partnered with Weeneebayko Area Health Authority. Peawanuck Nursing Station is staffed by two to three nurses and a nurse practitioner every two weeks. They can also be assisted by doctors at Weeneebayko Area Health Authority via teleconference, with occasional physician visits. Advanced medical care requires transport by air ambulance operated by James Bay Ambulance Services from Peawanuck Airport to Moose Factory or Kingston.

There is a fire station in town, which is staffed by about a dozen volunteers using a single fire truck.

Peawanuck is policed by the Nishnawbe-Aski Police Service, an Aboriginal-based service staffed by two officers.

== Utilities and Public Works ==
Electricity for the community is provided by three diesel generators and are maintained by the Ministry of Transportation.

There is a waste water treatment plant that serves all residential homes and most business. There is no sanitation services in Peawanuck due to lack of funds so waste is handled locally.

== Government Services ==
Ontario Ministry of Natural Resources provides staffing at the Polar Bear Provincial Park Office.

Ontario Ministry of Transportation has a garage in Peawanuck, maintains the power generators and manages the local airport. MTO has housing for out of town staff.

A Canada Post postal station is located in the Band Administration offices. Mail is delivered to Peawanuck by air with contract services with Air Creebec.

== Local Government ==
The local band council consists of band chief with 2 or 3 councillors elected to 2 year terms. Band Offices are located at a shared facility with FNP and Canada Post.

== Media ==
There are no newspapers in town. The Band Office maintains a local radio station, but has limited service time.

Television and radio services is by satellite only.

== Religion ==
Peawanuck has a local Catholic Church shaped as a teepee. Most residents are Catholic with a few Traditionalist or Born Again Christian.

== Recreation ==
There is no community centre and limited recreation facilities maintained by the Band Council or Catholic Church:

- 2 outdoor ballparks
- Catholic Church Children's playground
- Outdoor ice rink with Zamboni (broken)
- Multi-purpose Room
- Drop-In Centre

== Education ==
Matahhamao opened in 1995 by Weenusk Education Services is the only school in the community and offers classes up to Grade 8. Students moving on to Grades 9 to 12 and beyond must travel to large communities like Timmins and Moosonee.

== Economy ==
The community is served by a general store, a Northern Store, and a convenience store called Hudson Bay Variety. Goods must be shipped in by air. Northern Store provides banking services via fax to CIBC or Scotiabank in Moosonee and Timmins respectively.

- Peawanuck Development Corporation - operates Peawanuck Petroleum, General Store, Annual Barger Services and maintains winter road
- Hudson's Bay Adventures - offers outdoor adventures at Polar Bear Provincial Park
- Louie's Store (Louis Chookomolin Diversified Products)

== Climate ==
Peawanuck has a subarctic climate (Dfc) due to its location in far Northern Ontario, which brings long cold winters and short but mild summers. Peawanuck is one of the coldest communities in Ontario, having far different weather than the more populous parts of Ontario.

Climate data for Peawanuck (1991–2020 normals, extremes 1959–present) (Note: Long term records have been recorded at various climate stations in or nearby Peawanuck since 1959)
Month	Jan	Feb	Mar	Apr	May	Jun	Jul	Aug	Sep	Oct	Nov	Dec	Year
Record high °C (°F)	10.0 (50.0)	3.2 (37.8)	10.8 (51.4)	22.3 (72.1)	29.3 (84.7)	38.1 (100.6)	36.6 (97.9)	34.1 (93.4)	30.0 (86.0)	23.3 (73.9)	15.2 (59.4)	4.9 (40.8)	38.1 (100.6)
Mean daily maximum °C (°F)	−18.4 (−1.1)	−15.8 (3.6)	−8.7 (16.3)	−0.2 (31.6)	8.1 (46.6)	16.4 (61.5)	20.5 (68.9)	19.1 (66.4)	13.1 (55.6)	5.0 (41.0)	−4.2 (24.4)	−13.8 (7.2)	1.8 (35.2)
Daily mean °C (°F)	−23.3 (−9.9)	−22.1 (−7.8)	−15.6 (3.9)	−6.1 (21.0)	2.6 (36.7)	9.5 (49.1)	13.8 (56.8)	13.4 (56.1)	8.5 (47.3)	1.9 (35.4)	−8.0 (17.6)	−18.4 (−1.1)	−3.6 (25.5)
Mean daily minimum °C (°F)	−28.1 (−18.6)	−28.2 (−18.8)	−22.4 (−8.3)	−12.0 (10.4)	−2.8 (27.0)	2.6 (36.7)	7.1 (44.8)	7.6 (45.7)	3.8 (38.8)	−1.4 (29.5)	−11.6 (11.1)	−22.6 (−8.7)	−9.0 (15.8)
Record low °C (°F)	−47 (−53)	−47.2 (−53.0)	−43.2 (−45.8)	−36.7 (−34.1)	−20.6 (−5.1)	−6.5 (20.3)	−3.9 (25.0)	−2.2 (28.0)	−6.2 (20.8)	−21.3 (−6.3)	−32.2 (−26.0)	−46.1 (−51.0)	−47.2 (−53.0)
Average precipitation mm (inches)	32.3 (1.27)	16.7 (0.66)	17.4 (0.69)	35.2 (1.39)	47.5 (1.87)	90.3 (3.56)	89.4 (3.52)	76.5 (3.01)	76.3 (3.00)	56.1 (2.21)	45.3 (1.78)	24.5 (0.96)	607.5 (23.92)
Average rainfall mm (inches)	0.1 (0.00)	0.0 (0.0)	1.8 (0.07)	5.1 (0.20)	28.8 (1.13)	85.4 (3.36)	89.4 (3.52)	76.5 (3.01)	74.6 (2.94)	44.3 (1.74)	5.9 (0.23)	1.1 (0.04)	413.0 (16.26)
Average snowfall cm (inches)	28.6 (11.3)	16.4 (6.5)	16.0 (6.3)	28.9 (11.4)	27.7 (10.9)	14.6 (5.7)	0.0 (0.0)	0.0 (0.0)	2.7 (1.1)	16.8 (6.6)	38.1 (15.0)	24.3 (9.6)	214.1 (84.3)
Average precipitation days (≥ 0.2 mm)	13	8	9	12	14	12	13	14	17	17	19	16	164
Average rainy days (≥ 0.2 mm)	0	0	1	1	6	10	13	14	15	11	2	0	73
Average snowy days (≥ 0.2 cm)	12	8	9	10	10	3	0	0	3	11	18	16	100
Average relative humidity (%) (at 15:00 LST)	73.8	65.1	60.1	58.2	60.5	56.9	58.1	61.9	67.2	74.2	80.1	78.8	66.2
Source: Environment and Climate Change Canada (precipitation/rainfall/snowfall 1951–1980)

== See also ==
- Peawanuck Airport
