= Mid-Canada Line Site 060 Relay =

- Part of Mid-Canada Line
- Relay, Ontario, Canada

Site information
- Controlled by: Royal Canadian Air Force
- Condition: Remediated

Location
- Location of MCL Site 060
- Coordinates: 50.00163°N 81.61988°W

Site history
- Built by: Royal Canadian Air Force
- In use: 1957–1965
- Demolished: 2009

Mid-Canada Line Site 060 Relay was a part of the Mid-Canada Line air defence network. During the late 1950s, the Mid-Canada Line (MCL) was developed as a secondary line of detection in case enemy aircraft penetrated the Distant Early Warning Line. This consisted of approximately 90 unmanned sites and eight Sector Control Stations located along the 55th parallel. Each site sent out a radio beam to its neighbouring site. If an aircraft interrupted the beam, an intruder alarm would sound.

Relay was chosen as a relay station for signals coming in from the Sector Control Site at RCAF Station Winisk and would retransmit those signals to MCL Site 070 at Mount Kempis via tropospheric scatter.

MCL Site 060 ceased operations as a troposcatter repeater in April 1965 when the Mid-Canada Line was no longer economically feasible or required due to improvements in technology.

The site was remediated in 2009 when all contaminated soil was removed from the area after it was determined the site was contaminated with PCBs and hydrocarbons.
