= 1986 Winisk flood =

Severe weather event in Ontario, Canada

Coordinates: 55°16′N 85°11′W

On May 16, 1986, the Northern Ontario community of Winisk was flooded during an ice jam. The ice jam on the Winisk River caused large chunks of ice and flood waters to overwhelm the village. Two people were killed and all but two of more than 60 buildings in the community were destroyed.

== Background ==
The community of Winisk was home to the Weenusk First Nation and located along the river of the same name. Homes in the First Nation were built on muskeg. Located in subarctic Northern Ontario, the area was sparsely populated and could experience large-scale flooding caused by erratic spring ice breakup.

During Treaty negotiations, Indigenous leaders warned the federal government that the area chosen for the Weenusk First Nation was prone to flooding but their warnings were dismissed. The community had previously been destroyed by floods in 1966 but was resettled in the same location. Chiefs had urged the federal government to relocate the community due to the risk of flooding for twenty years prior to the 1986 flood. The federal and provincial governments had planned to relocate the community by 1989, after first constructing an airstrip.

Chief George Hunter and the band council had undertaken studies to determine what it would cost to move the community to higher ground, but funding was not approved for the move until weeks before the flood. Some members of the community prepared for flooding by tying up boats in their yards during the spring in case flood waters reached the village.

== Flood event ==
The ice upstream of the Winisk river broke up before the ice at the river's mouth. The ice and water flowing downstream could not flow into the bay and was instead forced up onto the riverbank. The ice and water came in, bursting the river's banks, and buildings were smashed and carried away by the ice. Although preparations were made, many residents of the community were caught by surprise when the ice came. Residents had minutes to board boats and canoes before the ice and water overwhelmed buildings. Massive boulders of ice, some described as being as large as two-story buildings, were carried by the torrent through town. Homes were lifted off of their foundations and carried inland by the floodwaters. Boats carrying evacuated residents were tossed around between huge chunks of ice, warping and crushing boats. Power lines snapped, and the community's power station exploded as ice chunks impacted the building, cutting off telephone and electricity to the community.

The community's priest used the community's only working radio to contact Telesat before the power was cut. A man from Telesat contacted authorities and helicopters arrived in the community approximately three hours later.

Rescue efforts took several hours as helicopters rescued residents from the ice and displaced homes in foggy conditions. People were airlifted to the Winisk Airport, which was above the floodwaters, and evacuated to Attawapiskat. Residents were allowed back into the community to collect some belongings on May 17.

== Aftermath ==
Two people died during the flood. An elderly man drowned after failing to reach his boat. A woman drowned and was crushed by ice after saving her baby from drowning. The community of Winisk was abandoned and the Weenusk First Nation relocated to a location chosen by the community, approximately 30 kilometres south. The new settlement was located on higher ground and was named Peawanuck, meaning "flintrock" in Cree language. It cost $10 million to construct the new homes in Peawanuck in 1987. The homes were built by Winisk residents, residents from surrounding First Nations and a few volunteers between May and December 1987. Supplies were delivered via helicopter transport, and specialists from the south came to construct a diesel power plant, drill wells, and to engineer an airstrip. During construction families lived in tents, and by the time they moved into their houses in December, it often reached −30 °C.

A coroner's inquest was launched as a result of the disaster. Several recommendations were made, including more effective surveillance of river conditions, the implementation of an early flood warning system, emergency transportation adequate to serve its population, and that a specialized committee be established to address the concerns of flooding in the James and Hudson Bay region. Communication was cited as an issue and it was recommended that each northern community be provided with portable radio systems. It was also recommended to Ontario Hydro that all power lines crossing river systems be raised to prevent damage like that caused at the Winisk flood.

The community of Peawanuck, as recently as 2016, commemorates the anniversary of the flood with community events.
