= Weenusk =

Weenusk may refer to:

- Weenusk First Nation, a Cree First Nation band government in Ontario, Canada
- a groundhog
- Weenusk, the name of two Hudson's Bay Company vessels
