= Weeneebayko Area Health Authority Paramedic Services =

- Headquarters: Moosonee, Ontario
- BLS or ALS: BLS
- Ambulances: +6
- Responses: ~4800 (based on monthly call average of 400 calls)
- Website: www.waha.ca

Weeneebayko Area Health Authority Paramedic Services (WAHA-PS), formerly James Bay Ambulance Services, services First Nation communities in Northern Ontario and is funded by the province of Ontario.

WAHA-PS services the communities and transfers to the nearest airport/helipad for advance care in the south by ORNGE.

Dispatch services are routed via Timmins Central Ambulance Communications Centre.

== Stations ==
WAHA-PS operates from 6 stations:

- Moosonee, Ontario - located at Fifth Street and Bay Road
- Attawapiskat, Ontario - east of the hospital site
- Fort Albany, Ontario - School Road and Main Road
- Peawanuck, Ontario
- Kashechewan, Ontario - at Base 4
- Moose Factory, Ontario - Emergency Preparedness and Response (EPR) Centre shared with Moose Factory Island Fire & Rescue and Nishnawbe Aski Police Service.

== Fleet ==
WAHA-PS operates Type II ambulances.
