= Winisk 90 =

- Indian reserve
- Winisk Indian Reserve No. 90
- Location within Ontario
- Coordinates: 55°16′N 85°11′W
- Country: Canada
- Province: Ontario
- District: Kenora
- First Nation: Weenusk

Area
  - Land: 53.10 km^{2} (20.50 sq mi)

Winisk 90 is a First Nation reserve and ghost town in the Kenora District in Northern Ontario, situated along the Winisk River. It was destroyed in the 1986 Winisk Flood. After the flood, the residents of the Weenusk First Nation were forced to re-locate to Peawanuck, 30 km inland.

Winisk was home to Royal Canadian Air Force Station Winisk, a Mid-Canada Line radar control station from 1958 to 1965.

== Winisk Airport ==
Winisk Airport
- IATA: YWN; ICAO: CA-0412

Summary
- Airport type: Military 1958-1965 / Civilian 1965-1986
- Owner: Government of Canada; Government of Ontario
- Operator: Royal Canadian Air Force 1957-1965
- Location: Winisk, Ontario
- Opened: 1958
- Closed: 1986
- Passenger services ceased: around 1986
- Built: 1957-1958
- In use: Royal Canadian Air Force 1958-1965
- Interactive map of Winisk Airport

Runways
Direction	Length		Surface
Direction	ft	m	Surface
	6,000	1,829	gravel

The town was served by Winisk Airport (YWN) via a 6,000 feet plus gravel runway which can still be seen in aerial photos on the east bank of Winisk River across from the abandoned townsite. It was built by the RCAF to serve RCAF Station Winisk in 1957-1958. Transair was initially contracted to provide transportation during the construction of the Distant Early Warning Line and in 1964 it began was operating scheduled weekly roundtrip passenger flights with Douglas DC-4 propliners on a Montreal - Ottawa - Winisk - Churchill, Manitoba routing. The RCAF left in 1965 but the airport remained until the town relocated in 1986 and replaced by Peawanuck Airport. Austin Airways connected Winisk with other northern communities until the airport closed in 1986.

=== Airlines / Destinations ===
Airlines	Destinations
Transair	Montreal - Ottawa - Winisk - Churchill, Manitoba
Austin Airways	Winisk - Timmins - Fort Albany - Moosonee - Attawapiskat - Kashechewan Airport - Fort Severn
