= Kashechewan First Nation =

First Nation in Ontario, Canada

Kashechewan
- Band No. 243
- ᑫᔒᒋᐗᓐ ᐃᓕᓕᐗᒃ kêšîciwan ililiwak
- People: Cree
- Treaty: 9
- Province: Ontario

Land
- Main reserve: Fort Albany 67
- Land area: 363.457 km^{2} (140.332 sq mi)

Population (October 2024)
- On reserve: 3309 (Note: includes Fort Albany)
- On other land: 101
- Off reserve: 2187
- Total population: 5597

Tribal Council
- Mushkegowuk Council

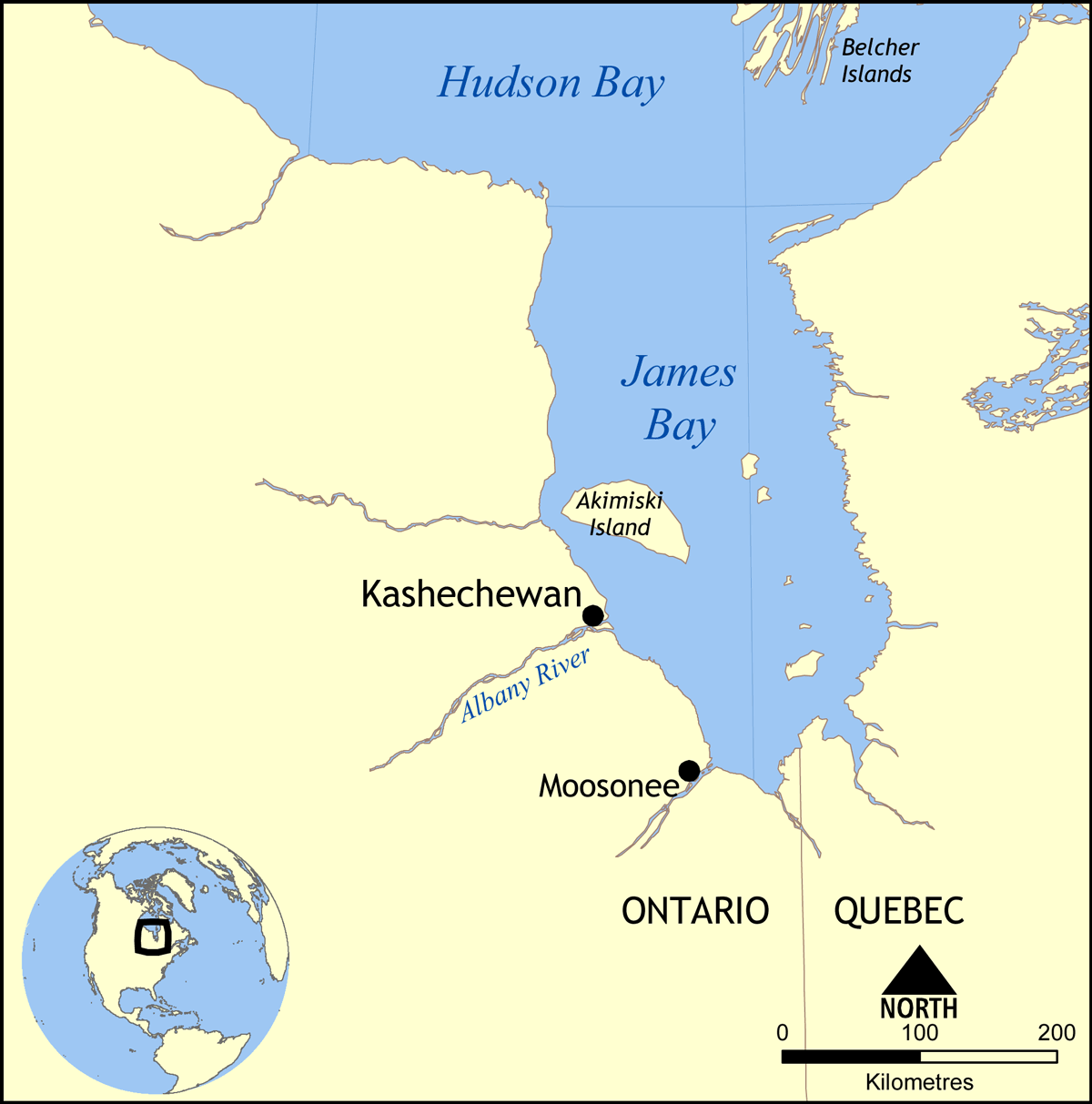
Map showing the location of Kashechewan, Ontario.

Kashechewan First Nation, (Note: /kəˈʃɛtʃəwən/; Swampy Cree: ᑫᔒᒋᐗᓐ ᐃᓕᓕᐗᒃ kêšîciwan ililiwak) locally known as Kash,^{:15} is a Cree First Nation located on the northern shore of the Albany River in Northern Ontario, Canada, within territory covered by Treaty 9. The community is located on the west coast of James Bay. Kashechewan came into being when most of the Anglican families of the Fort Albany First Nation (Fort Albany) on the south shore of the river moved north in 1958–1961. Kashechewan was granted its own band council under the Indian Act in 1977, though the two still share a reserve, Fort Albany 67. The population was estimated to be about 2,000 as of 2024, according to the CBC, and as of October 2024, the total population of Kashechewan and Fort Albany, which are reported together by CIRNAC, (Note: Crown–Indigenous Relations and Northern Affairs Canada) was 5,597.

The First Nation was the subject of international media attention due to the discovery of E. coli in the community's water in October 2005, which brought popular consciousness to the health, housing, and economic crises facing the community.

Kashechewan is prone to flooding during the annual spring break up of ice on the river, and has built dykes to mitigate the damage caused, but these have been repeatedly found to be insufficient. The community has often had to be evacuated during flooding season. Proposals have been made in the 21st century to move the community further inland to a less flood-prone area.

The community is connected to other towns along the coast of James Bay by the seasonal ice road. Otherwise, it is only accessible by air or boat, having no permanent roads that connect outside the First Nation.

Kashechewan is a member of the Mushkegowuk Council and the Nishnawbe Aski Nation (NAN), which represents 51 First Nations across Northern Ontario. NAN also provides services to its members, such as the Nishnawbe-Aski Police Service, which polices Kashechewan.

== Name ==
When Kashechewan was established as a distinct community in the mid-twentieth century, its residents chose the Swampy Cree name "Keeshechewan" (Swampy Cree: ᑭᔒᒋᐗᓐ, kišîciwan) meaning "where the water flows fast."^{:111} However, when the sign for the new post office arrived, it had the misspelling "Kashechewan", and this became the official name of the community. This official name has no real meaning in the Cree language.

== History ==
=== Before establishment of Kashechewan ===
The Mushkegowuk or Swampy Cree had lived on the west coast of James Bay and in the Albany River watershed from time immemorial by the time the first Europeans arrived in the 17th century. They and other Algonquian peoples organized themselves in loose patrilineal bands based around the extended family, which gathered into larger groups during the winter.^{:42}

In 1679, the Hudson's Bay Company established the trading post of Fort Albany on Albany Island at the mouth of the Albany River in order to trade goods with the Indigenous people of the area.

During the ensuing centuries of the fur trade era, the Mushkegowuk did not sell or give away any land, but traded furs and goods with the traders at the posts, who numbered no more than a few dozen at a time.

As the fur trade declined in the late nineteenth century, the ancestors of the present day Fort Albany and Kashechewan First Nations established their first settlement in the area, near the Hudson's Bay Company trading post, and near the Roman Catholic mission on St. Ann's Lake on Sinclair Island. This site came to be known as Old Post.

According to community members interviewed in 2010, by 1900, the Crees of Kashechewan trapped over an area of 640 square kilometres in the James Bay region.^{:68} On August 3, 1905, a ceremony was held at Fort Albany to sign Treaty 9. The treaty set aside reserve lands for the community and established a band government under the Indian Act, legally creating the modern reserve Fort Albany 67 and the Fort Albany First Nation government. The initial limits of Fort Albany 67 included the occupied area on the south shore of the river, where Fort Albany exists today, as well as 230 square kilometres of hunting land to the north of the river. Cree tradition does not recall an agreement to surrender land, rather that the treaty promised a sharing of land and resources, as well as infrastructure investment and employment for hunters.^{:68-9}

In 1906, the federal government began funding St. Anne's Indian Residential School, which had opened under the direction of the Oblates of Mary Immaculate and the Grey Nuns of the Cross in 1902 at the site of the Fort Albany Mission on Albany Island. The school was part of the Canadian Indian residential school system, and "was home to some of the most harrowing examples of abuse against Indigenous children in Canada," according to the Indigenous Peoples Atlas of Canada.

=== Establishment of Kashechewan ===
Kashechewan was established as its own community separate from Fort Albany in the 1950s. Reasons offered for why the community split vary.

According to members of the community, the move was prompted by an Indian Agent who arrived in the summer of 1957, suggesting the community move closer to the Hudson's Bay store, despite community members pointing out how the location on the north shore of the river was unfit and prone to flooding. After nobody had moved for two months, RCMP officers arrived to enforce the relocation, and many community members were forced to move.^{:111}

Alan Pope's 2006 report of the community offered the characterisation that some community members decided to move from the formerly-occupied Albany Island (the site known as Old Post) due to particularly intense flooding on that island in the mid-1950s. As a result, many decided to leave and go to the current site of Kashechewan on the north shore of the river, while some opted to stay on Sinclair Island, the current site of Fort Albany First Nation.

Another version of the history suggests that in 1957 or 1958, sectarian violence erupted between Anglican and Roman Catholic families in Fort Albany, which led one Anglican family to leave the main Old Post population centre on the south shore of the river and Sinclair Island, and relocate to the north shore of the river. This site would become known as Kashechewan. In the following three years, most of the Anglican families of Fort Albany moved to the north shore. By 1960, the Department of Indian Affairs recognized the new community as independent, but Fort Albany and Kashechewan continued to share the same chief and council.^{:35, 70} At the time of its creation, the community wanted to move to higher ground about 30 kilometres from its current location, but the current site was encouraged by the federal government.

In 1977, Fort Albany and Kashechewan came to have separate band councils. They are treated as separate bands, and function as separate bands today. The present-day Fort Albany First Nation is mostly a Roman Catholic community, while Kashechewan is mainly Anglican.

=== 2005 water-quality crisis ===
==== Background ====
In 2001, the Ontario Clean Water Agency conducted a survey, funded by the federal ministry of Indian and Northern Affairs and the Ontario First Nations Technical Services Corporation, of water systems on Indian reserves in the province. The survey identified 62 communities in the province, including Kashechewan, where severe problems affected the communities' water systems. These problems included broken treatment plant equipment, malfunctioning safety alarms, funding shortages, water sampling deficiencies and a shortage of trained water treatment plant staff.

In 2003, the community was placed on a boil-water advisory.^{:89} A report by OCWA described the situation in Kashechewan as "a Walkerton-in-waiting," referring to the Walkerton E. coli outbreak in the southern Ontario town of Walkerton in 2000. While the outbreak in Walkerton led to the passage of the 2002 Safe Drinking Water Act in Ontario, the act did not apply to the standards for water quality on reserves, being are under federal jurisdiction.^{:17} As the water quality worsened, Indian and Northern Affairs began to fly bottled water in to the First Nation. From April 2005 to mid-October 2005, this cost roughly $250,000 CAD.

==== Discovery of E. coli ====
On October 14, 2005, Health Canada issued an E. coli warning to Kashechewan Chief Leo Friday. That same day, Health Canada called the field manager of Northern Waterworks Inc. to investigate the situation. Arriving the following day, he discovered that a chlorine injector in the nine-year-old water plant had broken and that the coagulant chemical aluminum sulfate (used to remove discolouration) was ineffective in the water's cold temperatures. The Northern Waterworks Inc. field manager fixed the chlorine injector and ordered a different coagulating agent, polyaluminum chloride, from Fort Albany and Attawapiskat, and it arrived later on October 15. By October 17, the field manager had been able to conduct an E. coli test, and found the water to be free of harmful bacteria, and the chlorine levels were "below Ontario's standard recommended maximum."^{:78, 80, 130-2, 153} Another test on October 19 confirmed the lack of coliform bacteria.

==== Response ====
In the meantime, both local schools were closed while a team of community members formulated a response to the crisis. This "core committee" included the chief, deputy chief, the elementary school principal, the health director, the community crisis coordinator, and several teachers. Among their goals was to draw Health Canada's attention to the community's crises. They sent a press release to national media outlets, and the news of contaminated water was first published by the Timmins Daily Press on October 18. Much further attention from the media followed, including articles by The Canadian Press and Yahoo! News, highlighting the community's history of exposure to contaminated water and the harmful consequences to the population's health.^{:89, 131}

On October 19, Indian Affairs Minister Andy Scott arrived in Kashechewan in response to the growing media coverage. A community meeting was held about the situation with Health Canada and INAC (Note: Indian and Northern Affairs Canada) officials in the gym of St. Andrew's Elementary School. By that time, the community's drinking water was clean. In an effort to impress upon the minister and the officials the dire nature of the crises facing Kashechewan, bottles and jars of brown water collected from the river were presented at the meeting as though they were infected tap water, with residents angrily telling the government officials during the meeting, "You drink the water." The meeting became an outlet for members of the community to raise the many issues that had been plaguing Kashechewan for years with no action from the Ministry. Upon hearing the community's concerns, the Minister told them, "I think that this situation has been neglected for too long and it needs to be fixed. And I want to work with your leadership to figure out the plan to do that. No more band-aid solutions."^{:79, 132-3}

Following the minister's meeting and subsequent departure, media attention began to wane. On October 22, at the request of Kashechewan's health director, Edward Sutherland, a team from Moosonee's Weeneebayko General Hospital, led by Dr. Murray Trusler arrived in town. They were tasked to look for symptoms of E. coli infection and take photographs. They found no indication of E. coli infections in the houses they went to, but were shocked to discover the existing health crises present in the community. They took photographs of the dilapidated living conditions they saw, and the diseases they had caused or exacerbated. These reportedly included "toddlers with pneumonia and six-month-old babies with asthma" as well as "many kids [with] some form of skin disease, such as ringworm, scabies, or impetigo," and chronic conditions such as untreated diabetes and heart disease. They provided treatment to the immediate health problems that they could. The photographs taken by the medical team were sent to media outlets and the infections depicted were blamed on E. coli. These graphic images prompted renewed media interest starting October 25.^{:94, 97, 134-5}

On October 24, the federal Ministry of Indian and Northern Affairs Canada announced that after evaluating the situation, it would not recommend the community be evacuated, the Ministry's efforts instead focusing on bringing fresh water to the community in bottles and by creating it in situ. This was despite some community members returning to drinking their now-clean tap water. Meanwhile, following a meeting with Dr. Trusler on October 25, the Government of Ontario led by Premier Dalton McGuinty announced that it would evacuate all people of Kashechewan requiring medical attention.^{:136} 1,100 people ended up being evacuated, beginning on October 26, to places including to Timmins, Cochrane, Sudbury, Sault Ste. Marie, Capreol and other Northern Ontario communities for medical aid.^{:154}

On October 25, the federal government confirmed that "water samples taken between October 17, 2005, and October 19, 2005, indicated no E. coli or coliform bacteria present in the community’s water supply."

On October 27, several media crews arrived in the town on an air charter paid for by the NDP. Through their investigations and interviews with community members, some came to realise that the health conditions on display were not caused by E. coli. Some began to report that the chlorine levels in the water were now too high, which required the town to evacuate. This was despite the records of the field manager who had seen to the water plant earlier in the month.^{:138-9}

On October 27, the federal government led by Prime Minister Paul Martin confirmed that it would spend an estimated CA$300,000,000 in relocating the community to higher and safer ground in the area, including the creation of jobs during the relocation and the construction of a water treatment plant. The federal government announced a plan to create a "First Nations Health Organization" to coordinate the inconsistent and uneven medical services offered to indigenous communities. It also promised to "enhance family violence and suicide prevention services" in the region.^{:139} On October 30, a temporary portable water filtration system, capable of producing 50,000 litres per day of clean, drinkable water through reverse osmosis, was transported to the community, along with the Disaster Assistance Response Team and military rangers to help produce clean water for the community.^{:154}

On November 5, the federal government published a report that stated, "recent test results of water samples show no E. coli, no total coliform bacteria and maximum chlorine levels that fall within provincial standards. This means the plant is producing safe water."

Community members were evacuated, and threatened not to return to the town unless the federal government made good on its promises for infrastructure improvements. However, beginning November 28, INAC began airlifting residents back to the reserve.^{:142}

==== Reactions ====
The media attention brought to Kashechewan as a result of the water quality crisis was international, with American media claiming that the poor conditions in the community were a result of Canada failing to uphold "basic human rights."^{:17} During the crisis, Prime Minister Paul Martin was criticized for "systemic negligence." Richard Wagamese in The Globe and Mail called the situation in Kashechewan to be a "national tragedy."

==== Subsequent outbreaks ====
During the spring break up and subsequent flood in 2006, the water plant was flooded, causing another E. coli outbreak. Most of the town had already been evacuated from that year's flood by the time of the outbreak. This outbreak garnered less media attention than the one in October 2005.^{:108, 110}

=== Relocation ===
While Kashechewan community members had wanted to relocate to higher ground 30 kilometres away at the time of the town's founding in the later 1950s, the federal government had wanted it to remain at the mouth of the river.

In October of 2005, in the midst of the water crisis, Prime Minister Paul Martin had committed funds to assist the community in moving to higher ground. However, in 2006, the new Conservative government led by Stephen Harper cancelled the financial commitment to relocation made by Martin. The government hired lawyer and former politician Alan Pope to conduct a report on Kashechewan and make suggestions. His report was published on November 9, 2006, with a number of possible solutions to the ongoing Kashechewan crisis, including upgrading the current site, moving the community to a new site, and moving the residents to the existing communities of Fort Albany, Smooth Rock Falls or Timmins. A "significant portion" of the majority of respondents indicated Smooth Rock Falls as their preference. Pope, a resident of Timmins, recommended the Timmins option, citing the improved "individual and economic opportunities" and noting that no relocation would be acceptable to the community without maintaining links to the existing traditional land and reserve.^{:142-3}

In March 2007, a further survey of community members found that the majority rejected INAC's proposed move to the outskirts of Timmins, preferring to relocate within their traditional hunting grounds 30 kilometres up the river.^{:143} The Ministry rejected this proposal. On July 30, 2007, the Government of Canada signed a memorandum of agreement and understanding with the community, giving Kashechewan First Nation a grant of $200 million to improve and repair infrastructure, housing and flood-control services in the existing community.

Further studies have been conducted around possible locations to move the community to, and evaluations of the costs of relocation versus remaining.^{:144-5}

In September 2016, a referendum found that 89% of residents wanted to relocate the community. On March 31, 2017, the Government of Canada, the Government of Ontario, and Kashechewan First Nation signed a framework agreement, which would consider relocating the First Nation up river.

Against the backdrop of the 2019 Quebec, Ontario and New Brunswick floods, community members from Kashechewan held a rally in April 2019 on Parliament Hill to demand a relocation. At the rally, Indigenous Services Minister Seamus O'Regan promised that Kashechewan would be relocated within 10 years. A framework agreement to that effect was signed on May 9, 2019.

An acute outbreak of COVID-19 in June 2021, which led to around 300 infections in a few weeks, reignited calls to relocate the community quickly, in order to alleviate the dangers of overcrowding.

Since Fort Albany and Kashechewan share their territory, any relocation of Kashechewan would need to involve Fort Albany in the agreement. As of 2021, Fort Albany had become part of the discussions around relocating Kashechewan.

=== 2026 evacuation ===
On January 3, 2026, a state of emergency was declared as Kaschechewan's water treatment plant failed. Residents no longer had access to drinking water while also suffering from a gastrointestinal outbreak. Residents were evacuated to Timmins, Kapuskasing, Kingston and Niagara Falls.

== Geography ==
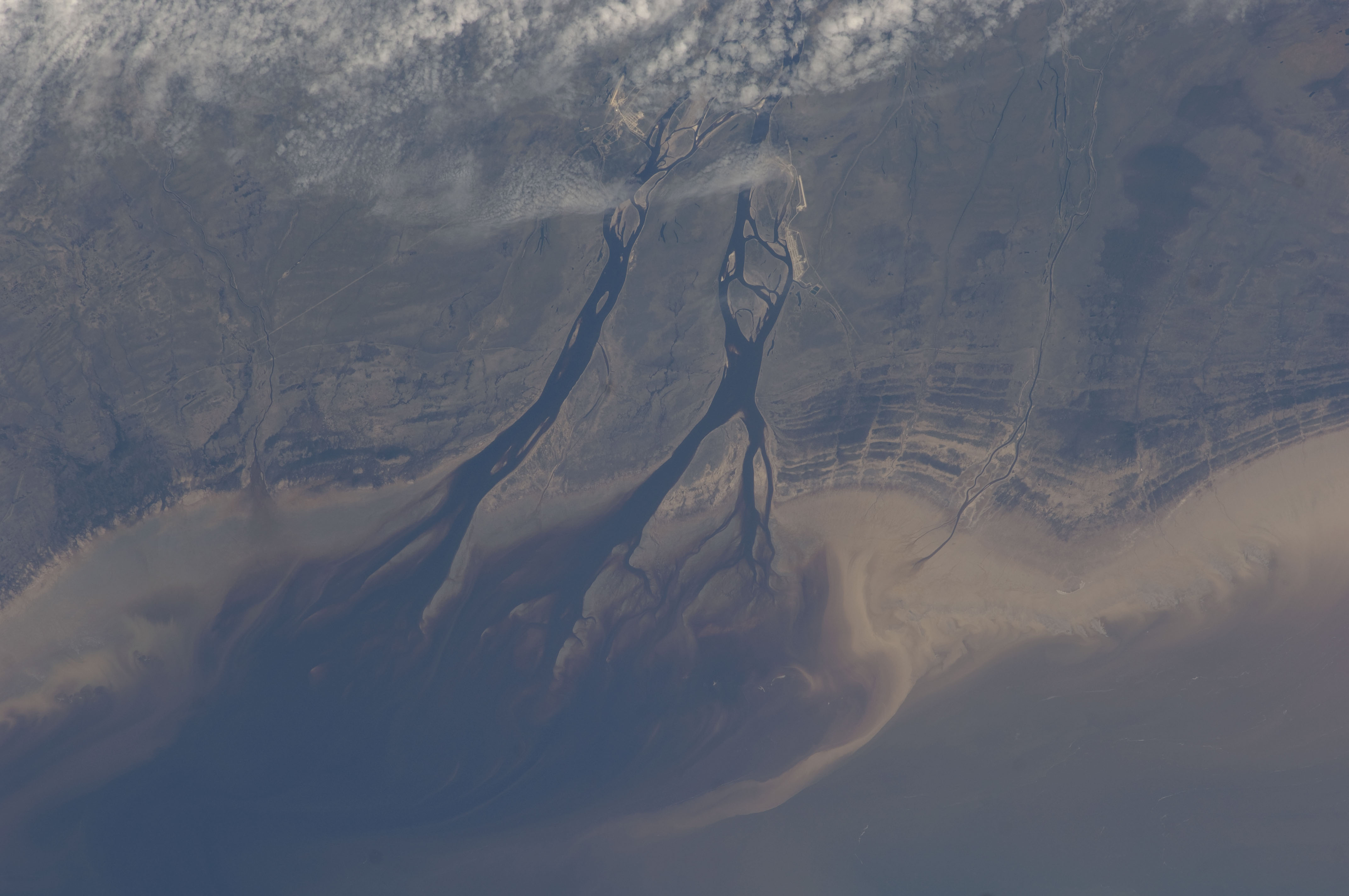
Mouth of the Albany River photographed during ISS Expedition 20 on June 13, 2009. Kashechewan is visible on the north bank of the river (right side) at the top of the photo.

Present-day Kashechewan is located on the north bank of the Albany river, within the large northern portion of the Fort Albany 67 reserve, which it shares with Fort Albany First Nation. It is located near the west coast of James Bay. The nearest large urban centre is Timmins, 460 kilometres to the south.

=== Flooding ===
Kashechewan is located on a floodplain 3.1–9m above sea level and is prone to flooding due to the annual thaw and break-up of ice on the river. Major floods were recorded in 1966, 1972, 1976, and 1985, in addition to almost yearly floods beginning in the 2000s. The flood on April 26, 1976 led to major destruction of property while residents waited on ice mounds to be evacuated to Fort Albany by helicopter.^{:111-112}

A ring dyke built along the north shore of the Albany River between 1995 and 1997 provides limited flood control, though two reviews of the construction in 1997 and 2001 found deficiencies and advised remedial work, which was not done. After water breached the dyke in 2006, an agreement was finally made between Kashechewan and Indian and Northern Affairs Canada in 2006 to carry out specific repairs and remediation work. Concrete blocks were used to shore up the structure, but began to fall apart after the 2010 spring season.

The community has suffered regularly since 2006 from flooding and water contamination when ice melts on the Albany River. As of 2010, such flooding was estimated to take place once every four years. As of 2016, it takes place nearly every year, with residents evacuated twelve times between 2004 and 2019. Residents are usually evacuated to Ontario communities including Kapuskasing, Thunder Bay, and Cornwall.^{:112} Aside from the physical damage caused by flooding, community members have reported poor mental health, including PTSD and eco-anxiety, related to the floods and evacuations.

The standard procedure of evacuating residents to other communities was complicated in 2020 with the onset of the COVID-19 pandemic in Canada. Former host communities were reluctant to bring in evacuees, as community members were reluctant to board evacuation planes. The Department of National Defence worked with the community to build an evacuation camp 37 kilometres upriver, and the federal government provided funding to support community members to go onto the land during flooding season, allowing them to participate in the seasonal goose hunt. As of May 7, 2020, 800 people had gone onto the land, and 400 more planned to do so soon. This local evacuation scheme was repeated in 2021, while in 2022 a few hundred of the more vulnerable members of the community were once again evacuated by air in while others went onto the land. In 2024, most of the community again went out on the land to wait out the floods, while some were evacuated south.

==== Long-term evacuees in Kapuskasing ====
In 2014, 560 community members who were evacuated to Kapuskasing had their Kashechewan homes condemned due to the intense flooding. Their homes remained unrepaired as of 2016, and the Kashechewan citizens were still staying in rental apartments and houses in Kapuskasing. A school was established in Kapuskasing for the Kashechewan evacuee children, called the Kash-Kap School for Evacuees. The school was paid for by the federal government, and most of the evacuee children attended it instead of the local public schools. This was due to the fact that the band council would have to pay for their tuition from their own education budget, and the provincial tuition fees were higher than the budget given to the band council. The evacuees were finally able to begin moving back to new homes in Kashechewan in November 2016.

=== Climate change ===
In a 2019 article for the Toronto Star, Tanya Talaga wrote about the impacts of climate change on Kashechewan, focusing on flooding. Talaga highlighting that while these small northern communities were not the biggest emitters of greenhouse gases, they were disproportionately affected by the effects of climate change. Noting the scarcity of scientific studies of the region, Talaga relied on traditional knowledge and oral history, including recollections of changing bird migration and shorter winters. According to Elders, warmer temperatures and shorter winters, in addition to more rain and faster run-off in the spring, all caused by climate change, are among the causes of increasing impact of the floods; the severity of the floods has not increased over time. Man-made obstructions connected to resource development in the area also increase the severity of ice floes.

==== 2023 wildfires ====
During the 2023 Canadian wildfires, neighbouring Fort Albany was threatened by a fast-growing forest fire. This led to Kashechewan residents boating across the river to rescue their neighbours, and several Fort Albany evacuees being housed in the high school gymnasium in Kashechewan. There were plans for further evacuations by air to locations further south, but when the wind shifted a few days after the fire began, these were cancelled.

== Demographics ==
=== Population ===
There is no precise reporting of the population of Kashechewan. Official reporting by Crown–Indigenous Relations and Northern Affairs Canada counts Kashechewan and Fort Albany's populations together, for a total of 5,597 band members as of October 2024, of which 3,309 lived on reserve Fort Albany 67, which is shared by both Nations.

According to the Toronto Star's coverage of the 1976 flood, the population at the time was between 600 and 800.^{:112}

The Globe and Mail reported a population of 1,900 in October 2005, as part of its coverage of the water quality crisis.

Alan Pope's 2006 report found that, while the Government of Canada recognised a population for budget purposes of 1,100, Pope himself estimated the population of the community to be between 1,550 and 1,700.

Alexandra Shimo's 2016 book Invisible North: The Search for Answers on a Troubled Reserve about her time living in Kashechewan in 2010 provides a population estimate of 1,800.

Coverage of the community by APTN National News in March 2017 estimated the population to be 2,300.

Further APTN coverage in April 2019 estimated the population to be more than 2,500.

Coverage by the CBC in June 2021 provided conflicting estimates of 1,500, 1,800, 1,900, and 2,000.

Further CBC coverage in September 2024 estimated the population to be about 2,000.

=== Birth rate ===
As of 2016, Kashechewan's annual birth rate was 37 births per 1,000 people, over three times higher than the rest of Canada.^{:28}

=== Religion ===
The predominant Christian denomination in Kashechewan is Anglican.^{:35, 70} The community is part of the James Bay Deanery of the Anglican Diocese of Moosonee. A new church was opened in 2019. Before then, the congregation met in a construction trailer.

As of 2010, the community had a minister who comes from outside of Kashechewan.^{:93} In 2019, then chief Leo Friday became ordained as an Anglican priest, which he felt was in line with his role as leader of the community. Friday also felt that traditional Cree beliefs mixed well with Christianity.

The local cemetery contains the remains of people of several religions, including "Anglicans, Pentecostals, and traditional Cree elders."

== Economy ==
According to reporter Alexandra Shimo's 2016 book based on her time in Kashechewan in 2010, the average annual earnings of a Kashechewan resident were $9,741, and 86% of the population survived on welfare. She notes that, while this figure would compare to the state of low-income countries like Iran, Namibia, and Sri Lanka, the situation in Kashechewan was made more acute than those countries by the exorbitant cost of fresh produce, four times as high as the rest of Canada. In terms of purchasing power parity, Shimo compared the relative income in Kashechewan to South Sudan, Haiti, and Afghanistan, which she calls "economies that have been ravaged by conflict and war." Reserve communities like Kashechewan with such deep economic crises have been referred to as the "Fourth World."^{:37-38}

Alan Pope, in his 2006 report on the community, found that the First Nation received between 18 and 22 million dollars each year in public funds. He identified that the community was five million dollars in debt, due to the council's attempt to provide adequate housing for its members. This indebtedness, in addition to the disarray of the band's accounting, had resulted in Kashechewan no longer being eligible for CMHC funding, as well as resulting in INAC and Health Canada holding back a percentage of funding as a penalty, thus worsening the financial situation of the band. Pope advised the suspension and eventual cancellation of the holdback penalty, an increase in funding to account for the actual population being higher than reported, and an audit of that year's finances, among other recommendations in his report.

Under the Stephen Harper government, the band council was placed under third-party management, allowing an outside company, Crupi Consulting Group to completely control the Nation's finances from 2007 to 2014. Crupi Consulting Group was also made co-manager of the community's Health Services from 2010 to March 2015. One of the band's co-managers, Joe Crupi, was later found to have misappropriated money from a federal program intended to provide breakfasts to schoolchildren between 2007 and 2012. In 2018, he was sentenced to three years in prison, as well as being required to pay the First Nation restitution of CA$656,157, the amount it lost from the breakfast program during his co-management. As of 2019, the Nation had issued lawsuits against several companies to recover millions of dollars alleged to have gone missing under third-party management.

=== Proposals for economic development ===
In 1978, an oil shale was discovered in the Silurian rocks on the northern end of Kashechewan, and the Ministry of Indian and Northern Affairs Canada (INAC) announced its intention to develop it. Chief Willie Wesley, in consultation with his band council, considered the recent decades of history around First Nations being relocated to allow for the development of natural resources, as with the Oujé-Bougoumou Cree Nation, who had been relocated upon the discovery of gold on their land. Emboldened by the previous year's publication of the groundbreaking Berger Inquiry, Chief Wesley asked INAC for assurances that his people would receive employment from the resource development, that the band council would have some say in its development and profits, as well as requesting further environmental protections. After no response for five years, the band council dropped the matter, and put forward a proposal for wind farming. However, when the INAC representative arrived, rather than take a reading of the wind by the shore, he measured the Beaufort scale next to the band office, in the centre of town. INAC determined that a wind farm would not be viable.^{:61-4}

In 1985, the Indian Act was reformed to allow First Nations control of their own economic development, which had previously been under the control of Indian agents. At that time, the reserve's unemployment rate was 90%. A proposal for a $6,000 fishery pilot project was sent by the Kashechewan band council to INAC. No response was returned.^{:52}

Another proposal, this time costing $2,000, was submitted in 1986 to build salt evaporation ponds on the southern James Bay coast. After receiving no response and submitting the proposal a second time, the Ministry responded that they would have to test any salt produced by this project, and that INAC lacked the resources to do so.^{:52-3}

In 1990, as part of an effort to create sustainable food options for the community, the band council issued a $17,000 proposal to the Ministry of Indian and Northern Affairs Canada to raise fifty chickens in a wooden barn. This scheme was partially inspired by the memory of a successful farm and greenhouse that fed the staff at St. Anne's. The proposal was rejected by the Ministry, which claimed it did not "meet feasibility requirements."^{:39}

Other economic development projects proposed by the band council have been denied by INAC, including a tree nursery proposed in 1987, a clay-mining project in 1995, a pig farm and lumber yard in 1993, a greenhouse in 1995, and a dairy farm in 2000.^{:53}

Alan Pope's 2006 report on the community called the economic development prospects of the Nation's traditional lands "bleak," stating that he had seen no articulation of an economic development strategy by the band council. He noted that some community members were hopeful regarding the development of the De Beers Victor Diamond Mine near Attawapiskat and the potential for hydroelectric generation in the lower Albany River.

In 2009, the Nation signed an Impact Benefit Agreement with De Beers. As of 2010, $19 million had been received by Kashechewan from De Beers. However, the mine had not provided the employment opportunities that many in the community had hoped for.^{:56-8}

== Arts and culture ==
The town holds Thanksgiving feasts, where the chief wears traditional garb including a headdress, and traditional music is played, in an effort to revitalize Cree traditions after the long history of suppression by residential schools and laws like the potlatch ban.^{:44}

Children in Kashechewan take part in various ceremonies upon reaching certain development milestones. Some of these are described in Alexandra Shimo's book:^{:86}

the Walking Out ceremony, where kids who had recently learned to take their first steps "walked out" of their tent through a flap facing the rising sun, dragging a small dead animal behind them, circled a tree, then returned to the tent to give the food back to the elders, symbolizing both their growing independence and the circle of life. Another such ceremony to instill bimboleytosowin [self-reliance] was Vision Quest, where children aged around eight had to spend one night alone in the bush, while an elder slept a stone's throw away in case they got into trouble. Being solitary in the dark was to teach them how to face their worst fears.

== Sports ==
The town has a sportsplex, Kashechewan Community Arena, that serves as the recreation centre for residents. It includes an arena, community hall, and gymnasium and is managed by the Kashechewan Recreation Department. Outside the sportsplex is a field for sports such as baseball, soccer, and football. The Recreation Department organizes ball hockey, badminton, and volleyball in the community.

The Kashechewan Minor Hockey tournament is an annual minor hockey tournament organized by the Recreation Department that held its 22nd annual edition in January 2019.

The Keesheechewan Siibii Challenge Cup is an annual senior hockey and broomball tournament held in the First Nation.

Hockey Indigenous is a Timmins-based non-profit organization founded by Kashechewan citizen Stephane Friday to support Indigenous youth playing hockey, including in Kashechewan. Before incorporating Hockey Indigenous in 2020, Friday was general manager of the Kashechewan Minor Hockey tournament, as well as the high school's boys and girls hockey teams.

== Government ==
=== Band council ===
Kashechewan is governed by a band council, which is elected under a custom election code, rather than the Indian Act. The community's leadership consists of a chief, a deputy chief and 9 councillors. Local elections are held every three years.

As of September 2024, the current chief was Hosea Wesley, who had previously served as deputy chief for six years.

The community also has a youth council consisting of 11 members with 5 key positions (youth chief, youth deputy chief, youth head councillor, treasurer and secretary).

=== Tribal council ===
Kashechewan First Nation is a member community of the Mushkegowuk Council, along with seven other First Nations in Northern Ontario.

=== Other representation ===
The community and Mushkegowuk Council are represented by the Nishnawbe Aski Nation (NAN). NAN is a political territorial organization that represents the 49 First Nations that are part of the Treaty No. 9 area in Northern Ontario.

At the provincial level, the community, tribal council and political territorial organization participate in a province-wide coordinating body, the Chiefs of Ontario. The Assembly of First Nations represents the community along with other First Nations organizations and councils, as well as over 600 First Nations across Canada.

=== Provincial ===
Kashechwan is represented provincially by the Member of Provincial Parliament for the electoral district Mushkegowuk—James Bay.

Mushkegowuk—James Bay
Assembly	Years	Member	Party
Riding created from Timmins—James Bay
42nd	2018–2022	Guy Bourgouin	New Democratic
43rd	2022–2025	Guy Bourgouin	New Democratic
44th	2025–present	Guy Bourgouin	New Democratic

=== Federal ===
At the federal level, Fort Albany is part of the Kapuskasing—Timmins—Mushkegowuk riding.

Parliament	Years	Member	Party
Timmins—James Bay; Riding created from Cochrane—Superior and Timiskaming—Cochrane
36th	1997–2000	Réginald Bélair	Liberal
37th	2000–2004	Réginald Bélair	Liberal
38th	2004–2006	Charlie Angus	New Democratic
39th	2006–2008	Charlie Angus	New Democratic
40th	2008–2011	Charlie Angus	New Democratic
41st	2011–2015	Charlie Angus	New Democratic
42nd	2015–2019	Charlie Angus	New Democratic
43rd	2019–2021	Charlie Angus	New Democratic
44th	2021–2025	Charlie Angus	New Democratic
Kapuskasing—Timmins—Mushkegowuk
45th	2025–present	Gaétan Malette	Conservative

=== Police and crime ===
Kashechewan is policed by the Nishnawbe-Aski Police Service, an Aboriginal-based service.

On January 9, 2006, a fire at the police detachment severely injured an officer and killed two inmates. On July 28, 2006, the police service suspended its activities in the community, "to protest the slow pace of construction of police facilities," according to Alan Pope's 2006 report on the community. A 2009 inquest into the disaster concluded that major issues that contributed to it were the lack of an adequate fire department in the community, the disrepair of the jail facilities, and low morale of the staff.^{:18} As of 2016, there had been no action on the findings of the inquest.

Since February 1995, Kashechewan has been a "dry" community. It is illegal to bring alcohol into town, under a by-law passed at that time under the Indian Act, meant to curb the "overflow of alcohol" allegedly entering into the community in the 1990s.^{:24}

In 2006, Pope identified significant problems with vandalism, reckless driving, and "out-of-control conduct" in Kashechewan, noting the apparent absence of any attempt by the band council to intervene to provide law and order, though he expressed hope that then recently elected chief Jonathon Solomon could improve things. He also identified domestic violence as a major issue in the community.

As described in Alexandra Shimo's book, since there are no permanent courthouses or judges in Kashechewan, criminal trials are carried out at the skating rink on days that a judge flies into town from a city further south.^{:34}

In 2020, the band council adopted a bylaw that allows it to banish drug dealers from the community. This bylaw was adopted in response to the rise in use of illegal drugs, including by children.

== Infrastructure ==
=== Transportation ===
A helipad next to the store is used by Ornge for medical transfers out of Kashechewan from the Kashechewan Nursing Station is operated by Health Canada but is assisted by the provincially run Weeneebayko Area Health Authority.

Roads in town do not connect beyond Kashechewan. Besides cars, skidoos provide means to travel in town. The town is serviced by taxis.^{:33}

Kashechewan Airport and boat travel are the only means to travel outside of Kashechewan.

Seasonal winter roads are created to provide contractor access to town, and to connect Kashechewan to neighbouring communities. In 2021, a 311-kilometre winter road was built that could accept loads of up to 50,000 kilograms in weight. The road was operated by Kimesskanemenow LP, "a limited partnership between the four communities it connects".

Feasibility studies were undertaken in 2017 as to the construction of a permanent all-season road between the communities of Kashechewan, Fort Albany, Moosonee and Attawapiskat. The project, if undertaken, would entail a "coastal road" connecting the four communities with each other, as well as a road to link the coastal road to the provincial highway system at Fraserdale, Kapuskasing or Hearst.

=== Healthcare ===
Kashechewan Health Services provides services that promote physical and mental health for community members. They provide health education regarding diabetes, cancer, and other serious ailments. They also offer programs that help with addiction, pregnancy, parenting, drug awareness, and crisis intervention.

Kashechewan Nursing Station provides basic health care needs in the community. It is federally run by Health Canada's First Nation and Inuit Branch and partnered with Weeneebayko Area Health Authority. As of August 2022, the nursing station, which should normally have had a staff of seven to nine, was operating with only three nurses, which meant that the station was not able to offer all of its necessary services. Earlier, Alan Pope's 2006 report on the community found that the under-resourced nursing staff could only provide acute and emergency care, with the situation "deteriorating and unacceptable." The Mushkegowuk Council declared a state of emergency in response to the August 2022 nursing shortages in Kashechewan and other communities, which was lifted in October.

As of 2010, the community was serviced by a doctor who flew in once a month.^{:30}

Alan Pope's 2006 report also found inadequacies in primary care services, nurse practitioners, dental care, pre-natal and post-natal care, among others, despite these issues having been identified by a health care needs study in the 1990s. Alexandra Shimo's book about her time in the community in 2010 identified malnutrition, lung problems, and skin diseases to be common problems.^{:91-92} Pope found that community members were often denied medical services if they did not possess an OHIP or status Indian card.

==== Suicide crisis ====
Northern Ontario reserves are reported to be among the world's highest suicide rates.^{:83} According to the community's fly-in coroner, suicide rates were estimated to be 2.5 people per year, equivalent to 138.9 per 100,000 for an estimated population of 1,800.^{:102} In 2019, Canada's suicide rate was 10.9 per 100,000, according to the World Health Organization.

In the wake of the 2005 water crisis, the federal government promised to provide support to help with the community's record-high suicide rate. However, the crisis persists despite the band council implementing its own community-based suicide prevention initiatives.^{:101}

In January 2007, 21 young people in Kashechewan — including one nine-year-old — attempted to commit suicide by overdosing on pills. The group was discovered before any died.^{:99} On February 7, MP Charlie Angus (NDP—Timmins-James Bay) spoke in the Canadian House of Commons about the crisis, calling on the government to deal with the crisis and to increase education funding to help improve special education and crisis counselling services in First Nations' schools.

The January 2007 pact was followed that month by another suicide pact of young people, and followed an earlier pact in the summer of 2006.^{:99}

Members of the community believe that the lack of employment and high cost of living on the reserve are driving the suicide crisis. Historically, the epidemic across First Nations communities has been blamed on the federal government's sedentarization programs, including the introduction of welfare programs which made communities less self-reliant. These analyses have been supported by several reports, including sociologist Ronet Bachman's 1992 Death and Violence on the Reservation and the 1996 report produced by the Royal Commission on Aboriginal Peoples.^{:101-3}

Choose Life Kashechewan is a program run by Kashechewan Health Services since 2017 to offer suicide prevention and other mental health resources to youth in the community.

==== Skin conditions ====
The reserve's water has been blamed by community members for chronic skin conditions, which gained public prominence in 2016 after MP Charlie Angus shared pictures of children with skin lesions on his Twitter account. Doctors flown into the community by Health Canada found 26 people, mostly children, with skin conditions; the patients were diagnosed variously with scabies, mild impetigo and, most commonly, eczema. Health Canada described the skin conditions as "not a medical emergency."

=== Housing ===
Homes in Kashechewan are mainly single-floor prefabricated houses or trailer homes.^{:25}

There is a long-standing overcrowding problem in the community.^{:89} Alan Pope's 2006 report on the community found most of the homes in Kashechewan to be inadequate, including two bedroom homes being equipped with three or four additional bedrooms in the basement to accommodate nine or ten adults. Alexandra Shimo's book Invisible North: The Search for Answers on a Troubled Reserve claimed that, as of 2010, there were 274 "one- to three-bed bungalows" in the community of 1,800, which led to people sleeping "in garden sheds, on floors, or anywhere there's a spare nook."^{:23}

Pope also reported on the structural integrity of buildings in town, noting that central areas of houses being dilapidated, and inability to meet federal or provincial fire, building, electrical, or environmental codes. One cause given for this was the indebtedness of the community and the resultant lack of CMHC funding. Pope's report noted positively that the Mushkegowuk Tribal Council was undertaking a renovation project funded by INAC in 2006 and 2007 to repair 60 homes damaged by flooding, and to purchase mobile homes.

According to Pope, there was no private home ownership in Kashechewan in 2006. He advised that INAC and the First Nation collaborate on a private home ownership program, noting that such programs had been successful in other First Nations.

As part of an agreement with the federal government in 2007, the community received CA$3,250,000 for house building and training in construction for community members.

In August 2016, a project began to build 104 new houses for the long-term evacuees whose homes were condemned following the 2014 flood. The first units were ready by November 2016.

=== Retail ===
Northern Store is the largest building in town, offering groceries and other goods such as ATVs. Having been historically founded by the North West Company, the store accepted furs as a means of payment until 2009.^{:35} The high price of fresh produce, typical of remote northern communities, is a problem at the Northern Store; as of 2010, a bunch of grapes cost CA$13.42.^{:104} The store includes a Tim Hortons and a Canada Post postal office.

Besides "the Northern," as of 2010 there were a few stores selling food, coffee, and goods run by locals. Due to Indian Act restrictions on on-reserve businesses, these stores operated unofficially.^{:55-6}

=== Utilities ===
A water treatment plant is found along the Mekopaymuko Channel near the Albany River. There is significant mistrust in the community about the water plant, with community members believing that infected water is the cause for the chronic skin conditions present in the community. This link has been regularly disproved by medical professionals.

There is a dump, which as of Alan Pope's 2006 report, was not properly maintained and was situated next to the floodplain of the Albany River, posing a threat of contamination to the water supply.

Kashechewan Power Corporation is the local hydroelectric distribution company.^{:101}

== Education ==
The Hishkoonikun Education Authority provides educational services to the children of the community, administering two schools: St. Andrew's Elementary School and Francine J. Wesley Secondary School. Hishkoonikun means "that which is left over" in Cree.^{:15}

As of June 2024, the student population at St. Andrew's Elementary School was approximately 310, while that of Francine J. Wesley Secondary School was approximately 214.

The schools have a council system, which had 14 members as of January 2016.

Every year, St. Andrew's Elementary School raises money to send the grade 8 class on a trip to Toronto.

=== Infrastructure ===
In 2005, mould was discovered in the old St. Andrew's Elementary School, which led to it being evacuated. This led elementary and secondary school students to share one facility. The elementary school sat empty for two years before burning down in 2007. The school was replaced with eleven blue portables, meant as a temporary solution but still being used as of 2018.^{:89} A newly constructed school finally opened in 2019, with a modular design to allow for the building to be moved easily during the planned community relocation.

Alan Pope's 2006 report on Kashechewan noted that attendance had dropped, computer equipment was antiquated, math and science was not offered due to inadequate class sizes, and the quality of education did not meet provincial standards. He noted that none of this could be blamed on the staff or teachers at the school. According to Alexandra Shimo, most of the teaching staff consists of a transient population of outsiders to the community.^{:88}

In 2009, a Parliamentary Budget Office report found the Department of Aboriginal Affairs was mismanaging its capital spending for school projects, meaning money that had been allocated to schools in the federal budget was not making its way to communities like Kashechewan.
