= RCAF Station Cranberry Portage =

- Mid-Canada Line Sector Control Station 700
- Part of Mid-Canada Line
- Cranberry Portage, Manitoba, Canada

Site information
- Controlled by: Royal Canadian Air Force

Location
- Location of MCL Site 700
- Coordinates: 54.58547°N 101.37139°W

Site history
- Built: 1957
- Built by: Royal Canadian Air Force
- In use: 1957 - January 1964

Royal Canadian Air Force Station Cranberry Portage (also RCAF Station Cranberry Portage) was a military installation located in Cranberry Portage, Manitoba.

Located on Athapapuskow Lake, RCAF Cranberry Portage was one of eight Sector Control Stations (SCS 700) on the Mid-Canada Line system of early warning radar stations. Each SCS received signals from a series of unmanned doppler transmitters located approximately 50 km apart. In Cranberry Portage, radio wave signals were transmitted along the chain of stations to the SCS, then to RCAF Station North Bay by land line. The radar station achieved full strength in April 1957 and was supported by RCAF Station Winnipeg.

The Mid-Canada Line operations ceased in January 1964 and RCAF Station Cranberry Portage was turned over by the Department of National Defence to the Government of Manitoba for civilian use.

== Civilian use ==
The residential and other facilities were used by the Frontier School Division and by the late 1960s, the Frontier Collegiate Institute was established, using one of the barracks as the Frontier Collegiate Residence, as well as the Area Four Administrative Office.

Today, the former mess hall provides all dietary services to high school students who reside on campus. The former Officers Mess is utilized primarily as a meeting room and location for large group presentations, and though the bar is still present, it has not been used for its intended purpose since the change of ownership. The helicopter hangar is now the home to the Area Four school buses. Officers houses are now homes provided to teachers at subsidized rents, while the three barracks are used only for storage. The facility-wide mechanical systems are also still operational including an underground freshwater storage tank.
