= Mid-Canada Line Site 070 Kempis =

- Part of Mid-Canada Line
- Mount Kempis, Ontario, Canada

Site information
- Controlled by: Royal Canadian Air Force
- Condition: Remediated

Location
- Location of MCL Site 070
- Coordinates: 48.37658°N 80.26809°W

Site history
- Built by: Royal Canadian Air Force
- In use: until 1965
- Demolished: 2009

Mid-Canada Line Site 070 Kempis was a part of the Mid-Canada Line air defence network. During the late 1950s, the Mid-Canada Line (MCL) was developed to supplement the Pinetree Line, providing earlier warning of incoming Soviet bombers. This consisted of approximately 90 unmanned sites and eight Sector Control Stations located along the 55th parallel. Each site sent out a radio beam to its neighbouring site. If an aircraft interrupted the beam, an intruder alarm would sound.

Mount Kempis (near CFS Ramore) was chosen as a relay station for signals coming in from the Sector Control Site at RCAF Station Winisk. The signals would be sent to Mount Kempis via a Tropospheric scatter system and then they would forward the signals via a land-line to the RCC at RCAF North Bay. This required the installation of a large parabolic antenna to receive the signals.

MCL Site 070 ceased operations as a troposcatter repeater in April 1965 when the Mid-Canada Line was no longer economically feasible or required due to improvements in technology.

The site was remediated in 2009 and any evidence that the site ever existed has been removed. Only a plaque commemorating the team who cleaned up the site remains.
