= Weeneebayko Area Health Authority =

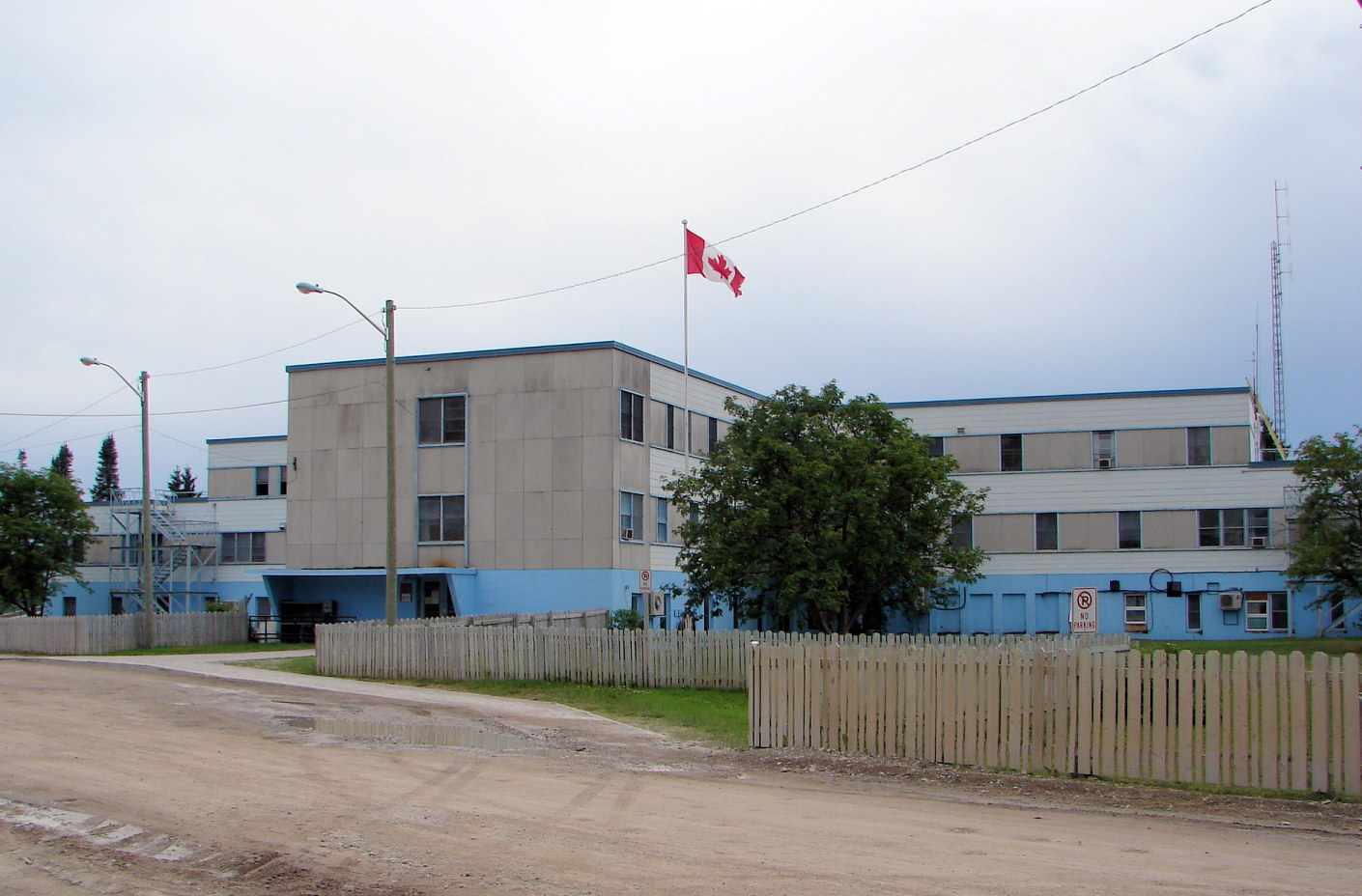
- Weeneebayko General Hospital in Moose Factory

Geography
- Location: Moose Factory, Ontario, Canada
- Coordinates: 51°14′59″N 80°37′02″W

Organization
- Care system: Public Medicare (Canada) (OHIP)
- Type: Community Hospitals and Nursing Stations
- Affiliated university: Queen's University

Services
- Emergency department: Yes (acute, subacute and ambulatory care)
- Beds: 69

Helipads
- Helipad: TC LID: CPN3 (Moose Factory)

History
- Founded: 2010

Links
- Website: www.waha.ca
- Lists: Hospitals in Canada

Weeneebayko Area Health Authority (WAHA) is a health-care network operating hospitals and supporting federal nursing stations in remote communities along the James Bay and Hudson Bay coasts in Northern Ontario, Canada.

== History ==
Created in October 2010, WAHA is the result of a merger between two existing hospitals, Weeneebayko Health Ahtuskaywin and James Bay General Hospital along with a number of smaller community health clinics.

== Locations ==
WAHA operates sites in Moosonee and the First Nation communities of Fort Albany, Attawapiskat, and Moose Factory and supports nursing stations in Kashechewan and Peawanuck.

== Weeneebayko General Hospital ==
Weeneebayko General Hospital is the successor to Weeneebayko Health Ahtuskaywin/Moose Factory General Hospital (c. 1966) and Moose Factory Indian and Inuit Hospital (c. 1950). Weeneebayko Health Ahtuskaywin was a federal funded hospital under Health Canada, where as most hospitals in Ontario are provincially funded.

Weeneebayko General Hospital 37 beds and provides acute care, long-term care, emergency services, mental health, general surgery and family medicine.

== Moosonee Health Centre ==
Moosonee Health Centre provides 24/7 emergency care, outpatient services and weekday clinics .

== Fort Albany Hospital ==
Opened in 1987 as a satellite site of James Bay General. Fort Albany Hospital has 17 beds providing 24/7 care staffed by registered nurses and consulting physicians in its emergency room.

== Attawapiskat Hospital ==
Opened in 1985 as a satellite site of James Bay, Attawapiskat Hospital has 15 beds and provides 24/7 care staffed by registered nurses and consulting physicians in its emergency room.

== Nursing Stations ==
WAHA has a partnership with First Nation and Inuit Health Branch (FNIHB) to support basic care in:

- Kashechewan Nursing Station
- Peawanuck Nursing Station

Both sites are staffed by FNIHB registered nurses and when needed Ontario primary and/or advanced care paramedics.

== Medical Transfers ==
For more advance care requiring transfers to Moose Factory or further south (Timmins and District Hospital or Kingston General Hospital) Weeneebayko General Hospital in Moose Factory has a helipad located on the south side of the hospital. All other locations require ambulance transfers by Weeneebayko Area Health Authority Paramedic Services to the nearest airport with ORNGE helicopters or other aircraft.
