= Mid-Canada Line =

Canadian radar defence line

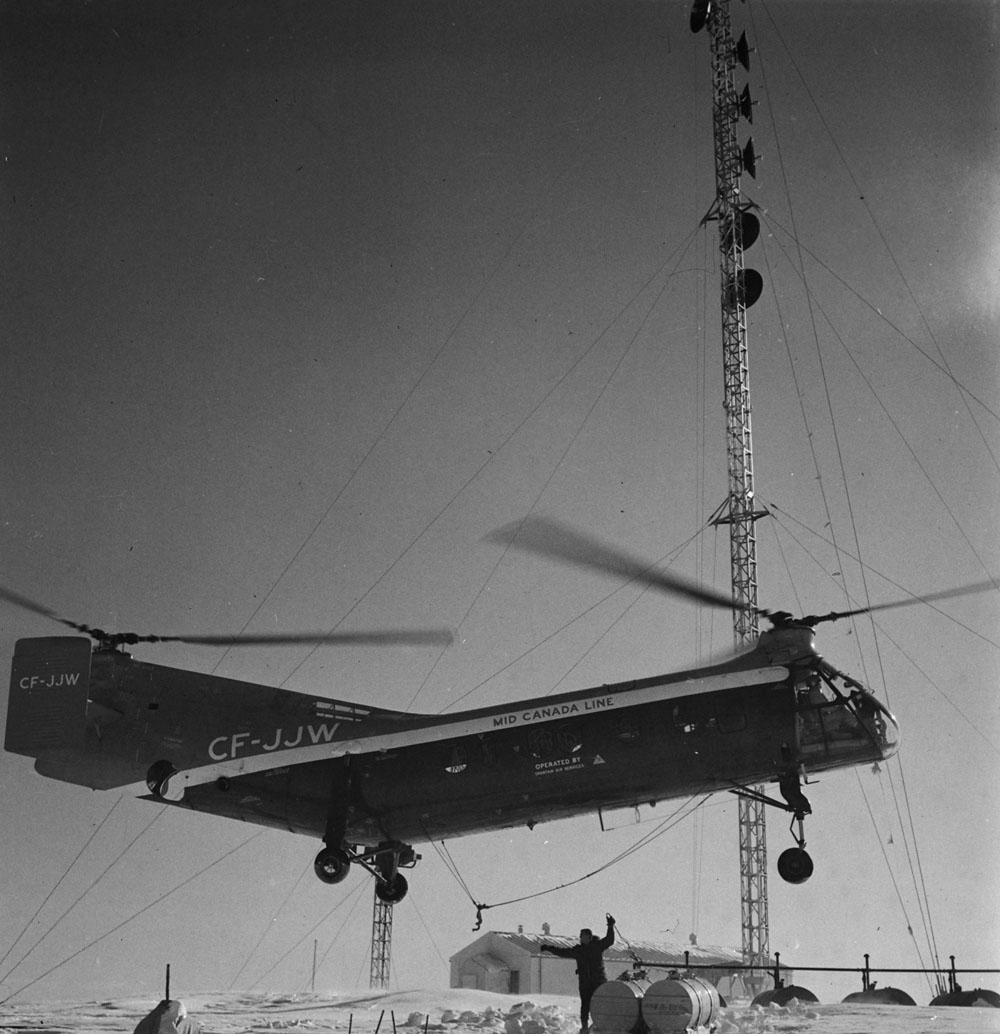
- A Piasecki H-21 drops supplies in front of a Mid-Canada Line radar tower. The antennas at the top and bottom of the stack link to the next stations in the line, the three in the middle send data southward to the air defense network.
- Active: 1956–1965
- Country: Canada
- Branch: Royal Canadian Air Force; United States Air Force
- Type: Early-warning radar
- Role: Continental Air Defence
- Part of: North American Aerospace Defense Command

The Mid-Canada Line (MCL), also known as the McGill Fence, was a line of radar stations running east–west across the middle of Canada, used to provide early warning of a Soviet bomber attack on North America. It was built to supplement the Pinetree Line, which was located farther south. The majority of Mid-Canada Line stations were used only briefly from the late 1950s to the mid-1960s, as the attack threat changed from bombers to ICBMs. As the MCL was closed down, the early warning role passed almost entirely to the newer and more capable DEW Line farther north.

The MCL was based on the bistatic radar principle, using separated transmitters and receivers. An aircraft flying anywhere between the stations would reflect some of the transmitted signal towards the receiver, where it would mix with the signal travelling directly from the transmitter. The mixing of the two signals produces a pattern that is very easy to detect using simple electronics. As the transmitter is not pulsed, it does not require high voltages and is very simple as well. This leads to a very low-cost system that can cover huge areas, at the cost of providing no information about the precise location of the target, only its presence.

Throughout its history, the MCL suffered from a problem that was never solved; because of the way bistatic radar works, any object relatively close to either station produces a large signal, in contrast to conventional monostatic (single site) radars where this effect is limited to the area immediately around the site. In the case of the MCL, this caused problems when flocks of birds would fly anywhere near either station and swamp the signal of a more distant aircraft. Solving this problem using the Doppler effect was a major design criterion for the AN/FPS-23 "Fluttar" that filled a similar role in the DEW line.

== History ==
=== Impetus ===
Construction of the Pinetree Line had only just started when air planners started to have concerns about its capabilities and siting. By the time it detected a potential attack by jet-powered aircraft, there would be little time to do anything before the attack reached Canadian or northern U.S. cities. Additionally, the Pinetree systems used pulsed radars that were fairly easy to jam and were unable to detect targets close to the ground due to "clutter." Although expensive in terms of fuel use, it would be possible for Soviet bombers to evade detection by flying lower and plotting a course between the stations.

Bennett Lewis, head of the AECL Chalk River Laboratories and former Chief Superintendent of the UK Telecommunications Research Establishment (TRE) had proposed to the Defence Research Board (DRB) a system that avoided both of these problems. Known today as a forward scatter bistatic radar, it used two antennas, a transmitter and receiver, separated by some distance. The antennas were positioned and aimed so that the signal from the transmitter filled the space above the line between the two stations. An aircraft flying into this region would reflect some signal back towards the receiver, allowing detection at altitudes as great as 65,000 ft.

A major advantage of the system is that it requires much less power to operate effectively. In a conventional radar, the radio signal has to travel to the target and back again. As each leg of the journey is subject to the inverse square law, the resulting radar equation contains a fourth-power dependence. In contrast, a forward-scatter radar signal always travels about the same total distance, from the transmitter to the receiver, modified only by the altitude of the target. This means it is dependent on the square root of range and not the fourth root, and thus delivers considerably more energy onto the receiver than a conventional radar over the same range. Also, unlike a conventional "monostatic" radar, the transmitter did not have to turn off to allow the receiver to listen for the signal. Since the total amount of energy received at the receiver is a function of both the peak power and the length of the pulse, using a continual signal means the same total energy will be deposited using much lower peak transmitter power. As a result, Lewis' system would require smaller sites and much less power than conventional radars like those of the Pinetree Line.

The major disadvantage of the system is that it did not indicate the aircraft's location within the beam, unlike a pulsed system where pulse timing can be used to determine range. This means the forward-scatter concept is useful for making a "radar fence" or "trip wire" that indicates that something is approaching, but not exactly where it is. To help address locating the target to a degree, the proposal was to build two interlinked fences, so that each pair of stations was perhaps 30 kilometres (19 mi) apart, a short enough distance that the radar on an interceptor aircraft would be able to find the target within that area. Using two overlapping sets also allowed one pair to cover the dead zone directly above the towers of the other.

Lewis' initial concept was to place the transmitters and receivers on telephone poles and electric power transmission towers, which provided both a convenient location as well as the small amount of power needed to run the electronics. In the case of the telephone poles, the lines would also be used to send the data back to the tracking stations. This concept generated a considerable amount of interest, although it was abandoned for reasons that are not entirely clear. Willis and Griffiths speculate it might be the need for 1,000 such radars, but it is also likely that the desired to locate the line further north than the heavily settled areas in southern Canada was likely significant as well. In any event, the simplicity of the concept helped bring it to the attention of air planners.

=== Spider Web ===
The DRB decided to pursue Lewis’ idea in 1950–51 by directing a research contract to the Eaton Electronics Research Laboratories of McGill University, headed by Professor Garfield Woonton. Lewis suggested to DRB and Woonton that he put the project in the hands of associate professor, J. Rennie Whitehead as project leader, a former colleague of his from the TRE days in the UK who had recently taken a position at the Lab. Some preliminary tests were made in 1952 with breadboard hardware built by a graduate student, Hugh Hamilton, in order to confirm the validity of the idea.

In the meantime, RCA Victor had been brought in by the DRB to design and produce the receivers, transmitters and antennas for tests on a substantial scale. The testing was performed in the summer of 1953, when Whitehead and his team of RCA Victor and RCAF personnel installed and operated a string of seven stations stretching from Ottawa to Mattawa (Note: Whitehead states the line stretched to North Bay, but lists stations only as far as Mattawa.) along the Ottawa River valley. Known under the code name of "Spider Web" at the suggestion of Hamilton, the tests were made with aircraft from CFB St. Hubert, near Montreal. All observations were transmitted to and made in the line HQ, which was set up in the equipment hut of one of the seven stations, located in Deep River.

Flight Lieutenant Andrew Matthews of the 104 Communications Flight at RCAF St. Hubert arranged for a series of different aircraft to fly through the network, including an Auster light aircraft, a T-33 Shooting Star, an Avro Lancaster bomber and even a recently acquired de Havilland Comet jet transport. The tests revealed a great deal about the spectral ‘signatures’ of aircraft crossing the line at different points, and demonstrated the capability to detect all sizes of aircraft from 100 ft to over 40,000 ft in altitude. During this time Dr. Ross Warren of RCA Victor and Dr. Whitehead jointly developed the theoretical background for the work in a major report to DRB.

The Spider Web trials were followed in 1954 by intensive tests on a single 30 miles (48 km) wide link, built in the Eastern Townships by Bell Canada, who had by this time been given the go-ahead for the implementation of the Mid-Canada Line. When Whitehead inquired why RCA had not been given the contract, a colleague replied "Who do you think runs Canada?" (Note: A more likely reason was that Bell had recently won the contract to install the Pole Vault system in Labrador, demonstrating their ability to complete projects with difficult logistics.) The trials on this prototype link were also conducted by Whitehead and a small team in collaboration with Air Defence Command, St. Hubert, this time on behalf of Bell. The trials involved the flyover of numbers of B-52 bombers by arrangement with Strategic Air Command and a local bombplot unit. They also had full-time use of an Avro Lancaster from CFB Greenwood for the important low-level tests.

=== Deployment studies ===
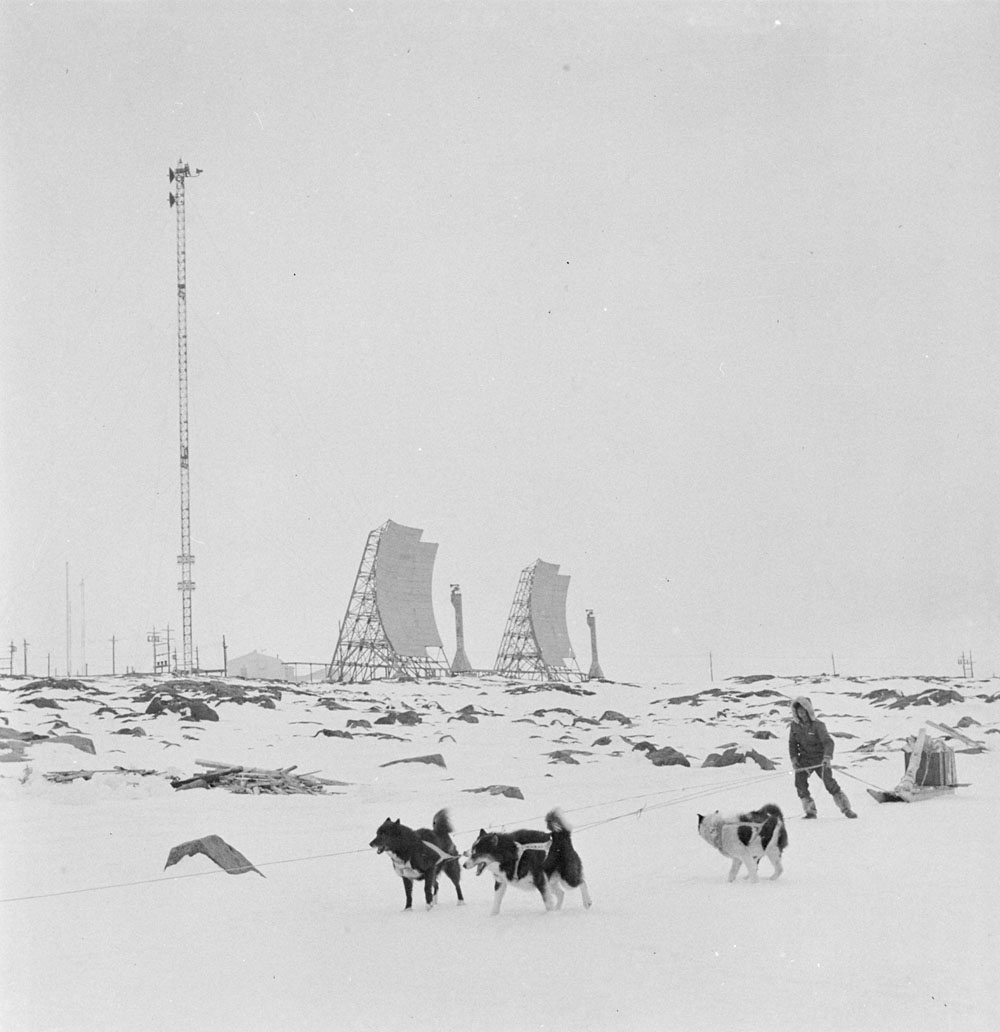
Unknown MCL radar and troposcatter communications antennas.

In February 1953 the Canada-U.S. Military Study Group (MSG) was asked "to study those aspects of the North American Air Defence System in general, and the early warning system in particular, which are of mutual concern to the two countries." The MSG then asked the air defence commanders of Canada and the United States to prepare independent briefs on the subject. By July 1953, RCAF Air Defense Command had completed its brief, followed shortly thereafter by its USAF counterpart. Both reports suggested building a Doppler fence farther north, along the 55th parallel, roughly at the entrance of James Bay into Hudson Bay.

In October 1953 the MSG recommended to both governments "that there be established at the earliest practicable date, an early warning line located generally along the 55th parallel between Alaska and Newfoundland", and outlined their minimum operational requirements. By the end of November 1953, the Mid-Canada Line had been approved in principle. Unlike the jointly-operated Pinetree line and future DEW line, the Mid-Canada line would be funded and operated entirely by the RCAF. The DRB estimated that the system would cost about $69,700,000, while an independent RCAF report placed it at $85,000,000, equivalent to $254,200,000 in 2025.

In December an effort started to try to understand what sort of problems would be encountered during construction. Several "trains" consisting of tractor-pulled sleighs set out cross-country. One, manned by the RCAF, set out eastward from Fort Nelson, BC in order to link up with a second moving west from Flin Flon, Manitoba, while a third crewed by the Army left Lake Nipigon near Thunder Bay, Ontario for Lansdowne House about 200 kilometres (120 mi) further north. The missions proved that it was possible to build the new line, but only during the winter when the muskeg was frozen solid. These missions also inspired the U.S. Army to invest in purpose-built overland trains which they experimented with in the 1960s but never put into production.

While that was taking place, efforts were underway to start primary siting studies. It quickly became clear that the areas in question, at least in eastern Canada, were so remote that there was no really accurate topographical information. A huge effort to map the area in a 15-mile wide strip across the entire country was started by Transport Command almost immediately, and ended by the spring of 1954. With this information in hand a construction division was set up, the Systems Engineering Group (SEG), in February 1954, tasked with producing a final report on the system to be submitted on June 1.

=== Finalizing the plans ===
As the experiments continued it became clear that by using taller masts, 350 feet (110 m) tall, the radar stations could be located further apart, up to 90 kilometres (56 mi). This reduced the number of stations required. Nevertheless, the price rose, now estimated at about $120,000,000. Although their final report was not yet ready, the SEG put in an interim report in June and it was approved by cabinet by the end of the month.

In their report they outlined the system that would be built almost exactly. It called for eight major Sector Control Centres, numbered from 200 to 900, each of which control up to thirty unmanned radar sites for a total of 90 radar stations. Each of the radar stations consisted of a single tall mast with a number of small dishes in fixed positions on top (typically four, two pointed in either direction), with power and electronics located in a building beside the base of the mast.

The sector control centres were linked using an advanced microwave communications system developed in part by CARDE, which scattered off the troposphere for long-distance communications. The southernmost site along the eastern portion of the line, at Cape Henrietta Maria on Hudson Bay, was used as the main communications point, with three additional repeater stations transferring data from the line southward to the NORAD command center in North Bay, Ontario. The easternmost station at Hopedale, Labrador was co-located with an existing Pinetree Line station in order to save construction costs.

All aircraft transiting the line would have to file a flight plan through the Mid Identification Zone, or MIDIZ, centred on the fence. The plans also called for the construction of several airbases known as Line Clearance Aerodromes just to the north of the line, where interceptor aircraft could operate in times of heightened alert.

At about this time another huge civil engineering project was underway in Canada, the construction of a cross-Canada microwave relay telephone system. Since many of the logistics problems were similar, the construction group, led by Bell Canada, was selected as a major contractor for the base construction. Detailed site selection started in 1955, with a major surveying effort running across Canada at the 55th parallel. The sites were so remote that the RCAF had to form up its first all-helicopter squadron in order to provide flight support for the survey teams.

== Construction and service ==
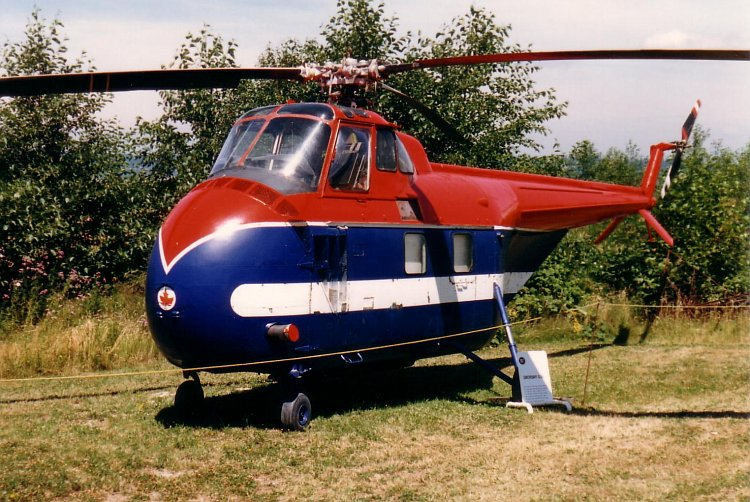
Sikorsky H-19 Chickasaw at the Canadian Museum of Flight 1988. The aircraft is painted as it would have looked while working on the construction of the Mid-Canada Line

Construction started in 1956 and proceeded quickly. By April 1957 the eastern half was operational, and the line was declared fully operational on January 1, 1958. Operations were shortly integrated into the newly formed NORAD. Even the SEG's revised estimates turned out to be too low, and the fence's final cost is estimated at $224,566,830, equivalent to $2,425,900,000 in 2025.

Almost as soon as the units went into operation, a serious problem was seen. Due to the large radar cross sections seen in forward-scattering radars, even small targets produced detectable signals. This was multiplied if the targets were roughly the same size as the wavelength of the radar, or in this case, tended to be spread out in patterns that were multiples of that wavelength. This problem was triggered by the large flocks of migrating waterfowl during the spring and fall, which created signals so powerful that it rendered the radars useless. Testing on the Spider Web and Eastern Townships systems had both been carried out during the summer, so this had not been noticed.

Even before the line became operational, in a repeat of earlier history, a new and more capable line was already under study that would combine the plotting capability of the Pinetree system with the line-breaking capabilities of the MCL, and located much farther north to dramatically improve the detection and response times. Emerging as the Distant Early Warning Line, or DEW, construction started before the MCL had become operational. When the DEW line became operational in 1957, the value of the MCL was eroded, and the RCAF started pressing for it to be dismantled.

Although technically capable, the MCL gave little information for vectoring interceptors to their targets, so these tasks still required the Pinetree radars much farther south. The extra time offered by the MCL was not considered worth the trouble of keeping the line operational. The USAF disagreed, but despite their objections, the western half of the line was shut down in January 1964, leaving the eastern half to help defend the industrial areas of Canada and the US. As the Soviet Union moved their offensive capability to ICBMs it became clear that both the MCL and Pinetree systems were of limited use, and the entire Mid-Canada line was shut down in April 1965. The operations site located at Cranberry Portage, Manitoba, for example, has been converted into a high school and residence since active operations at the site closed in the mid-1960s.

The DEW line stations were sited to provide the best possible view of the horizon, but there remained a minimum detection angle below which aircraft could sneak by without being seen. During early planning, a system like the MCL's towers was considered as gap-fillers between the stations to prevent these sorts of intrusions. As the MCL came online and the problem with birds became clear, the original forward-scatter concept was replaced by one using Doppler filtering to ignore anything flying below 125 miles per hour (201 km/h). These AN/FPS-23 "Fluttar" systems did indeed filter out birds, but failed to filter out the general aviation aircraft flying in the area, including those flying base-to-base for servicing and crew rotations. As a result, the false-alarm rate rendered it just as ineffective as the MCL, and it lasted even a shorter time, shut down in 1963.

== Stations ==
From a December 1956 listing:

| Site | Name | Coordinates | Radio Bcn | Activated | Deactivated |
|---|---|---|---|---|---|
| Site 200 | Hopedale Air Station, Sector Control Station | 55.46448°N 60.23281°W | | | |
| Site 201 | Doppler Detection Station | 55.46448°N 60.23281°W | | | |
| Site 203 | Doppler Detection Station | 55.430000°N 60.980556°W | | | |
| Site 206 | Doppler Detection Station | 55.312500°N 61.824444°W | | | |
| Site 209 | Doppler Detection Station | 55.407778°N 62.416667°W | | | |
| Site 212 | Border Beacon, Doppler Detection Station | 55.33362508°N 63.1909903°W | | | |
| Site 215 | Doppler Detection Station | 55.361239°N 64.025045°W | | | |
| Site 218 | Doppler Detection Station | 55.271217°N 64.819786°W | | | |
| Site 218A | Doppler Detection Station | 55.264416°N 64.293449°W | | | |
| Site 221 | Doppler Detection Station | 55.301236°N 65.401044°W | | | |
| Site 221A | Doppler Detection Station | 55.298332°N 65.338585°W | | | |
| Site 224 | Doppler Detection Station | 55.260512°N 66.068434°W | | | |
| Site 224A | Doppler Detection Station | 55.272999°N 66.220665°W | | | |
| Site 227 | Doppler Detection Station | 55.313057°N 66.705042°W | | | |
| Site 300 | RCAF Station Knob Lake, Sector Control Station | 54.81445°N 66.75540°W | | | |
| Site 303 | Doppler Detection Station | 55.317112°N 66.693968°W | | | |
| Site 303A | Doppler Detection Station | 55.188168°N 67.406166°W | | | |
| Site 306 | Doppler Detection Station | 55.265999°N 68.345001°W | | | |
| Site 306A | Doppler Detection Station | 55.190166°N 68.106003°W | | | |
| Site 309 | Doppler Detection Station | 55.192282°N 69.021651°W | | | |
| Site 309A | Doppler Detection Station | 55.153°N 68.792168°W | | | |
| Site 312 | Doppler Detection Station | 55.235195°N 69.741478°W | | | |
| Site 312A | Doppler Detection Station | 55.202999°N 69.524834°W | | | |
| Site 315 | Doppler Detection Station | 55.181337°N 70.579852°W | | | |
| Site 315A | Doppler Detection Station | 55.166586°N 70.670194°W | | | |
| Site 318 | Doppler Detection Station | 55.247815°N 71.341220°W | | | |
| Site 318A | Doppler Detection Station | 55.266666°N 71.316666°W | | | |
| Site 321 | Doppler Detection Station | 55.246032°N 72.200488°W | | | |
| Site 321A | Doppler Detection Station | 55.259167°N 72.203667°W | | | |
| Site 324 | Doppler Detection Station | 55.339030°N 73.016892°W | | | |
| Site 324A | Doppler Detection Station | 55.333332°N 73.02417°W | | | |
| Site 327 | Doppler Detection Station | 55.249568°N 73.744928°W | | | |
| Site 327A | Doppler Detection Station | 55.297832°N 73.747169°W | | | |
| Site 330 | Doppler Detection Station | 55.320926°N 74.571406°W | | | |
| Site 330A | Doppler Detection Station | 55.294666°N 74.557335°W | | | |
| Site 333 | Doppler Detection Station | 55.293534°N 75.273589°W | | | |
| Site 333A | Doppler Detection Station | 55.338823°N 75.408193°W | | | |
| Site 336 | Doppler Detection Station | 55.359209°N 76.101265°W | | | |
| Site 336A | Doppler Detection Station | 55.266666°N 75.98333°W | | | |
| Site 339 | Doppler Detection Station | 55.272633°N 76.791478°W | | | |
| Site 339A | Doppler Detection Station | 55.25°N 76.833336°W | | | |
| Site 342 | Doppler Detection Station | 55.242466°N 77.637492°W | | | |
| Site 400 | RCAF Station Great Whale River, Sector Control Station | 55.2788°N 77.7391°W | | | |
| Site 401 | Doppler Detection Station | | | | |
| Site 403 | Doppler Detection Station | 54.992482°N 78.287418°W | | | |
| Site 403A | Doppler Detection Station | 55.108002°N 78.203331°W | | | |
| Site 406 | Doppler Detection Station | 54.828095°N 79.003071°W | | | |
| Site 406A | Doppler Detection Station | 54.799999°N 79.050003°W | | | |
| Site 409A | Doppler Detection Station | 54.6385°N 79.689835°W | | | |
| Site 410 | Cape Jones Relay Site | 54.639179°N 79.744042°W | | | |
| Site 412 | Doppler Detection Station | 54.329657°N 81.096952°W | | Remediated | |
| Site 413 | Doppler Detection Station | 54.364327°N 81.099790°W | | Remediated | |
| Site 415 | Cape Henrietta Maria Relay Site | 54.731585°N 82.408135°W | | | |
| Site 416 | Doppler Detection Station | 54.779104°N 82.381244°W | | Remediated | |
| Site 418 | Doppler Detection Station | 54.876020°N 82.980113°W | | Remediated | |
| Site 421 | Doppler Detection Station | 54.860346°N 83.413607°W | | | |
| Site 424 | Doppler Detection Station | 55.075916°N 84.310824°W | | | |
| Site 427 | Doppler Detection Station | 55.066613°N 84.851164°W | | | |
| Site 500 | RCAF Station Winisk, Sector Control Station | 55.2442°N 85.1117°W | | Remediated | |
| Site 503 | Doppler Detection Station | 55.284721°N 85.708336°W | | | |
| Site 506 | Doppler Detection Station | 55.288032°N 86.423622°W | | | |
| Site 509 | Doppler Detection Station | 55.490167°N 87.074014°W | | | |
| Site 512 | Doppler Detection Station | 55.590647°N 87.865076°W | | | |
| Site 515 | Doppler Detection Station | 55.880790°N 88.583708°W | | | |
| Site 518 | Doppler Detection Station | 55.974316°N 89.219653°W | | | |
| Site 521 | Doppler Detection Station | 56.225037°N 89.889381°W | | | |
| Site 524 | Doppler Detection Station | 56.290352°N 90.666916°W | | | |
| Site 527 | Doppler Detection Station | 56.411439°N 91.460713°W | | | |
| Site 530 | Doppler Detection Station | 56.380230°N 92.189115°W | | | |
| Site 533 | Doppler Detection Station | 56.466152°N 92.807660°W | | | |
| Site 536 | Doppler Detection Station | 56.395274°N 93.334667°W | | | |
| Site 600 | RCAF Station Bird, Sector Control Station | 56.50725°N 94.21345°W | | | |
| Site 603 | Doppler Detection Station | 56.166667°N 94.701389°W | | | |
| Site 606 | Doppler Detection Station | 56.025833°N 95.422222°W | | | |
| Site 609 | Doppler Detection Station | 55.806944°N 96.088056°W | | | |
| Site 612 | Doppler Detection Station | 55.661111°N 96.711111°W | | | |
| Site 615 | Doppler Detection Station | 55.316667°N 97.258333°W | | | |
| Site 618 | Doppler Detection Station | 55.180278°N 97.860278°W | | | |
| Site 621 | Doppler Detection Station | 54.913056°N 98.510556°W | | | |
| Site 624 | Doppler Detection Station | 54.798611°N 99.277222°W | | | |
| Site 627 | Doppler Detection Station | 54.636111°N 99.880556°W | | | |
| Site 630 | Doppler Detection Station | 54.665833°N 100.644444°W | | | |
| Site 700 | RCAF Station Cranberry Portage, Sector Control Station | 54.58547°N 101.37139°W | | | |
| Site 701 | | | | | |
| Site 703 | Doppler Detection Station | 54.680556°N 102.052778°W | | | |
| Site 706 | Doppler Detection Station | 54.652222°N 102.702222°W | | | |
| Site 709 | Doppler Detection Station | 54.829722°N 103.375000°W | | | |
| Site 712 | Doppler Detection Station | 54.896667°N 104.269444°W | | | |
| Site 715 | Doppler Detection Station | 54.974167°N 104.790278°W | | | |
| Site 718 | Doppler Detection Station | 54.931667°N 105.736111°W | | | |
| Site 721 | Doppler Detection Station | 55.065556°N 106.436111°W | | | |
| Site 724 | Doppler Detection Station | 55.075000°N 107.138889°W | | | |
| Site 727 | Doppler Detection Station | 55.244444°N 107.647778°W | | | |
| Site 730 | Doppler Detection Station | 55.324167°N 108.094444°W | | | |
| Site 733 | Doppler Detection Station | 55.613889°N 108.476389°W | | | |
| Site 736 | Doppler Detection Station | 55.996111°N 109.283333°W | | | |
| Site 739 | Doppler Detection Station | 56.142222°N 109.476389°W | | | |
| Site 742 | Doppler Detection Station | 56.358333°N 110.398611°W | | | |
| Site 745 | Doppler Detection Station | 56.529722°N 110.966667°W | | | |
| Site 800 | RCAF Station Stoney Mountain, Sector Control Station | 56.44973°N 111.0339°W | | | |
| Site 803 | Doppler Detection Station | 56.518333°N 111.784722°W | | | |
| Site 806 | Doppler Detection Station | 56.558889°N 112.211111°W | | | |
| Site 809 | Doppler Detection Station | 56.606722°N 113.070833°W | | | |
| Site 812 | Doppler Detection Station | 56.373056°N 113.438889°W | | | |
| Site 815 | Doppler Detection Station | 55.996944°N 114.090000°W | | | |
| Site 818 | Doppler Detection Station | 55.820278°N 114.654722°W | | | |
| Site 821 | Doppler Detection Station | 55.645556°N 115.020556°W | | | |
| Site 824 | Doppler Detection Station | 55.613333°N 115.725000°W | | | |
| Site 827 | Doppler Detection Station | 55.538333°N 116.121944°W | | | |
| Site 830 | Doppler Detection Station | 55.623333°N 117.051667°W | | | |
| Site 833 | Doppler Detection Station | 55.518333°N 117.725000°W | | | |
| Site 836 | Doppler Detection Station | 55.615278°N 118.567222°W | | | |
| Site 839 | Doppler Detection Station | 55.569722°N 119.222500°W | | | |
| Site 842 | Doppler Detection Station | 55.623956°N 119.712778°W | | | |
| Site 900 | RCAF Station Dawson Creek, Sector Control Station | 55.74627°N 120.22968°W | | | |
| Site 900R | | | | | |
| Site 901 | | | | | |
| Site 903 | Doppler Detection Station | 55.612500°N 120.425000°W | | | |
| Site 050 | Fort Albany Tropospheric Scatter Repeater | 52.21138°N 81.67393°W | | | |
| Site 060 | Relay Tropospheric Scatter Repeater | 49.9990°N 81.6187°W | | | |
| Site 070 | Mount Kempis Tropospheric Scatter Repeater | 48.37621°N 80.26805°W | | | |

== POL Supply Points ==
Petroleums, Oils and Lubricants (POL) Supply Points were distribution centers for consumable petroleum materials used to fuel and maintain the Mid-Canada Line DDS sites. Co-located with Sector Control Stations when possible, petroleum products were received in bulk and shipped out by air from these locations. From the same December 1956 listing.

| Supply Point | MCL Sites Serviced | Coordinates |
|---|---|---|
| Hopedale, NF | 201 | 55.46448°N 60.23281°W |
| Goose Bay, NF | 203, 206, 209, 212 | |
| Knob Lake, QC | 215, 218, 221, 224, 227, 303, 306, 309, 312, 315, 318, 321 | 54.81445°N 66.75540°W |
| Great Whale River, QC | 324, 327, 330, 333, 336, 339, 342, 403, 406, 409, 410 | 55.2788°N 77.7391°W |
| Bear Island, Nunavut | 412, 413 | |
| Winisk, ON | 415, 416, 418, 421, 424, 427, 503, 506, 509, 512, 515, 518 | 55.2442°N 85.1117°W |
| Gillam, MB | 600, 536, 533, 530, 527, 524, 521 | |
| Ilford, MB | 606, 609 | |
| Thicket Portage, MB | 615, 618, 612 | |
| Wabowden, MB | 621 | |
| Wekusko, MB | 624, 627, 630 | 54.503333°N 99.751111°W |
| Cranberry Portage, MB | 700, 701 | 54.58547°N 101.37139°W |
| Flin Flon, MB | 703, 706, 709 | |
| La Ronge, SK | 712, 715, 718, 721 | |
| Meadow Lake, SK | 724, 727, 730, 733, 736, 739 | |
| Anzac, AB | 742, 745 | |
| Waterways, AB | 803, 806 | |
| Slave Lake, AB | 809, 812, 815, 816, 821 | |
| High Prairie, AB | 824, 827 | |
| Falher, AB | 830, 833 | |
| Sexsmith, AB | 836, 839 | |
| Dawson Creek, BC | 842, 900R, 903 | 55.74627°N 120.22968°W |

== See also ==
- Distant Early Warning Line
- List of Royal Canadian Air Force stations
- Pinetree Line
