= RCAF Station Winisk =

Military installation

- Mid-Canada Line Sector Control Station 500
- Part of Mid-Canada Line
- Winisk, Ontario, Canada

Site information
- Controlled by: Royal Canadian Air Force

Location
- Location of MCL Site 500
- Coordinates: 55.2442°N 85.1117°W

Site history
- Built: 1957
- Built by: Royal Canadian Air Force
- In use: 1957 - April 1965

Royal Canadian Air Force Station Winisk (RCAF Station Winisk) was a military installation located in Winisk, Ontario.

RCAF Winisk was one of eight Sector Control Stations on the Mid-Canada Line system of radar stations. Each SCS received signals from a series of unmanned detection sites located approximately 50 km apart. In Winisk, radio wave signals were transmitted along the chain of stations to the SCS, then to MCL Site 070 Mount Kempis via tropospheric scatter system and finally to RCAF Station North Bay by land line. As there is no road or rail access to Winisk, an airstrip was also built to serve the base (and still exists on the site).

Opened in 1957, and fully operational in 1958, RCAF Station Winisk was in operation for just eight years. The eastern portion of the Mid-Canada Line was shut down in 1965 and the Winisk base was closed. Buildings and roads on the site remain.

== Environmental legacy ==
Local First Nations and Timmins-James Bay Member of Parliament Charlie Angus urged the federal government to clean up the site, which they say is contaminated with asbestos, PCBs and other toxins. In 2006, Angus stated that there are over 50,000 barrels of toxic material and that PCB levels in the soil were 16,000 times acceptable levels. A clean-up operation was conducted between 2011 and 2013.
