= Weenusk First Nation =

Cree First Nation band government in Ontario

Coordinates: 55°01′13″N 85°42′28″W

Location of Weenusk First Nation in Ontario

Weenusk First Nation (Cree: ᐐᓈᐢᑯ ᐃᓂᓂᐗᐠ (wînâsko ininiwak); unpointed: ᐧᐃᓇᐢᑯ ᐃᓂᓂᐧᐊᐠ) is a Cree First Nations band government in the Canadian province of Ontario. Weenusk First Nation is an independent member of the Nishnawbe Aski Nation (NAN).

Weenusk First Nation's reserve is the 5,310 hectares (13,100 acres) Winisk Indian Reserve 90. Associated with the reserve is their Winisk Indian Settlement also known as Peawanuck, which also holds reserve status. Originally, the Weenusk First Nation was located within their reserve, but they were forced to move 30 kilometres (19 mi) southwest to Peawanuck when on May 16, 1986, spring floods swept away much of the original settlement, which had been located 6 km (3.7 mi) upriver from Hudson Bay.

== Demographics ==
In the Cree language, "Peawanuck" means "a place where flint is found," while "Weenusk" means "ground hog". The community, being primarily Swampy Cree, speaks the n-dialect of the Cree language. The 2021 Canadian census said that the community is composed of 247 people. Of these 220 people 220 wereFirst Nations, 10 Métis and about 25 non-Indigenous people. (Cree (120 people), Oji-Cree (10 people), and 60 First Nations not included elsewhere. In addition to Cree, Anishininiimowin and Ojibwemowin are also spoken there.

== Governance ==
Weenusk is governed by Chief Joseph (Joey) Edmund Charles Hunter and three councillors: Jeffrey Felix Hunter, Leah Carol Hunter, and Joseph (Paul) Koostachin.
