= John Horden =

19th-century Anglican Bishop of Moosonee

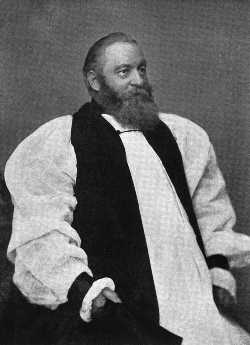
- John Horden as bishop

Bishop
- Born: January 20, 1828; Exeter, England
- Died: January 12, 1893; Moose Factory, Ontario
- Venerated in: Anglican Church of Canada
- Feast: 12 January (Anglican Church of Canada)

John Horden (January 20, 1828 – January 12, 1893) was the first Anglican Bishop of Moosonee, Canada, who for more than forty years led services in Cree, Inuit and other languages of his parishioners.

== Early life ==
Horden was born in Exeter, England, the eldest son of William Horden (a printer) and Sarah Seward, and received his early schooling at St. John's School, paid for by charitable donations. He was apprenticed to a blacksmith while still a child, spending his spare time improving his education. By attending night school and studying during odd moments, he was in time able to become a teacher and schoolmaster. He took advantage of the opportunities to study given him there and eventually learned to read Latin and Greek.

Horden was an active member of his local Church of England congregation (Church of St. Thomas the Apostle, Exeter) and regularly attended the vicar's Bible class, which offered information on the mission opportunities available in addition to a Biblical education. With two other students, he expressed his interest in the mission field and they met to pray and study. After some time they all volunteered for the Church Missionary Society and two were accepted. Horden was rejected and told that he was still thought too young to be a church leader in "heathen" areas. He was, however, encouraged to continue his schooling and was told that he would hear from the Society when they needed someone.

== Arrival in Hudson's Bay Territory ==
On May 10, 1851, Horden received a letter from them, informing him that the Bishop of Rupert's Land, had made a request for a schoolmaster at Moose Factory, territory of the Hudson's Bay Company, and that he had been appointed to fill the position. They also told him to prepare to leave within a month and indicated that they desired that he marry and take his wife out to assist him in his missionary work. He immediately prepared for his new position. He contacted his fiancée of one year, Elizabeth Baker Oke (1826–1908), a teacher who trained at The Home and Colonial School Society (Gray’s Inn Road, London), and someone who also had missionary aspirations, and they quickly married (May 28, 1851). Horden was to assume the role of catechist, to superintend the schools and to be a scripture reader at the Sunday services. Elizabeth was charged with supervising the girl’s schools and teaching the Indian women. In London, Horden met with Reverend George Barnley, a Wesleyan Methodist missionary at Moose Factory until 1847, who introduced him to some basic Cree language and its symbolic writing.

On June 8, 1851, the young couple set sail for North America. Horden spent much of his time on the trip by continuing his studies of the Greek Testament and of the Cree language. He benefited from the prior experience of several of the crew of the ship with the language and had developed a small vocabulary by the end of the voyage. He also learned to play the accordion. Elizabeth's first pupil was onboard, a woman returning to Hudson's Bay.

The ship arrived at Moose River on August 26 and the passengers were delivered to Moose Factory. The young couple lived at the residence of Chief Factor Robert Miles, affording them some time to acclimate to the daily routines at Moose Factory before moving into the repaired Methodist parsonage just ahead of winter. It was Miles who had persistently urged for a replacement for Barnley at the mission, having lost his two front teeth, he remarked "…it is a labor for me now to read the service."

Upon his arrival, Horden found that the Cree were familiar with the Ten Commandments, and that prior missionaries had already created a translation of the Lord's Prayer and a few biblical texts. Horden used the existing transliteration system, introduced by Methodist James Evans in the preceding decades, to help him in his own studies. He also worked closely with Thomas Vincent, a "mixed race" missionary born in Osnaburgh House, who worked as a labourer, teacher, and translator for Horden. Horden established a school on the island, which children from as far as away as Fort Albany attended.^{:113}

While living alongside the Cree of Moose Factory, he wrote down new words as he heard them and, after eight months' effort, was able to preach to them in their own language without an interpreter. Horden created his own version of the Lord's Prayer, later translating the Apostles' Creed, the Ten Commandments, some prayers from services, a few hymns, and some passages of scripture, all of which he copied and circulated among the Cree. He used the opportunity he had at the mission school to teach the adults and children how to read and write, and the fundamentals of Christianity. Horden also worked to address the spiritual needs of the staff of the Hudson's Bay Company at Moose Factory. They were very grateful and, along with the native parishioners, repaired the church, improved the residence that he and his family used, and built a schoolhouse.

== Mission priest and Cree bible ==
After one year, Bishop David Anderson of Rupert's Land visited the mission, and decided to ordain Horden as a priest (August 24, 1852) to better serve this location rather than replace him.

Although the Bishop and Horden discussed establishing a central residential school in the future, the schools continued to operate as day schools. Students lived on the mainland, those from elsewhere staying in "boarding homes." New students were first taught by Cree to read and write in their own language, then, they progressed to the English school.^{:114} This became a long-standing practice, and in 1879 the Diocese indicated that their schools aimed to teach "every child, whether European, half-caste, or Indian" to read and write in their own language. Funding was obtained through the Coral Missionary Society, largely through the efforts of Beatrice Batty and other editors of its magazine, to create a foster care program for orphans. These children were cared for in the homes of native families in the settlement, remaining part of Cree society, and could attend school, which was not compulsory. A summer school program was established for Cree children living in outlying areas, who were educated in their own language.

Horden prepared a prayer book, a hymnal, and translations of the Gospels in the Cree language, and sent them to England with an order for a thousand copies. The printer had no proofreader capable of reading the print, and decided the person who created the manuscript would probably be best qualified to check it. On that basis, in 1853, they returned the manuscript to him, with a printing press specially prepared. However, they did not include the instructions on how to operate it. Horden spent his free time studying the mechanism and operation of the machine for several days, leading his neighbors to wonder what was bothering him. Then one day he came running to the camp waving a sheet of paper over his head, shouting, "Come, see this thing!" They followed him and saw the first sheet Horden had printed. Horden proudly told them that he would now be able to give them books. For the next several years, he and his students printed and bound books which were distributed throughout the region, substantially increasing the awareness of and interest in Christianity in the area.

Bishop Robert Machray visited the area and was very impressed by Horden's achievements. He licensed four of Horden's lay readers to conduct services and read the Scriptures among their fellows, the first time a bishop licensed lay readers in any of the stations of the Church Missionary Society.

Over several years, John Horden worked with E. A. Watkins at Fort George to produce religious material in syllabics for Inuit. In 1865, when they were both in London, they spent time together modifying the Cree syllabic system to the Inuktitut language.

== Family ==
Island life in this remote territory was both exerting and fulfilling. The settlement was mainly inhabited by the Cree, connected to the mainland by an ice road in the winter, and home to an international community of Hudson's Bay Company employees at the post. Severe famine and flooding were not uncommon, with Horden remarking that during the spring thaw of 1857, every house on the island flooded, "having five feet nine inches deep in my own kitchen." Epidemic outbreaks of influenza struck in the winter and whooping cough plagued them in the summer. In 1858, Horden and his young family traveled north to visit Eskimo at Little Whale River. On their return to Moose Factory, they realized they had just escaped an outbreak of whooping cough that claimed 32 lives, including that of "Little Susan", a native orphan who the Hordens had raised from infancy.

Horden and Elizabeth had six children, five of whom survived infancy: Elizabeth Anderson Horden (b. 1852) named for Bishop Anderson, John Oke Horden (b. ~1854), who became a physician and surgeon in Middlesex, England and to whose home his mother retired in later life, Christiana Seward Horden (b. 1856), who married William Kelk Broughton (District Manager and Chief Trader at Albany, Rupert's House and Moose Factory, awarded Gold medal and two bars), Beatrice Campbell Horden (b. 1863), and baby "Bertie", Herbert Henry Horden (b. 1866), who also became a doctor in Middlesex, England but died by suicide in 1904 from prussic acid poisoning. Daughter Ellen Hudson Horden (1860–1861), named after her place of birth, was buried at Moose Factory.

After delaying their plans of a furlough for an entire year due to a ship-wreck, in 1865 Horden and his family sailed back to England through icebergs and freezing storms, and Thomas Vincent was placed in charge of the mission. Upon Horden's return to England, he found he was very well known throughout the British Isles, and became a popular and sought-after speaker. In 1867, Horden returned overland from Montreal to James Bay, travelling the last 1,200 miles (1,900 km) by canoe with Elizabeth and their two youngest children, having left the three older children to be educated in England. Horden later remarked on his "loneliness", missing his children in England.

Horden and Elizabeth traveled to England again in the fall of 1880. Their youngest son was sent to Monkton Combe School, near Bath, Somerset and in 1881 John and Elizabeth can be found on the census in the nearby village of Combe Down. At that time her mother Jane Oke, a widow since 1846 who had worked as a dress maker, was living in "Free Cottages" at St. David, Devonshire and Elizabeth's unmarried sister Christiana, an upholsteress, was living there also. When Horden returned to Hudson's Bay in 1882, Elizabeth now 56 years of age, remained behind to attend to her family in England and was active in raising contributions for the Moosonee Association until her death in 1908.

When Horden went on furlough for the last time in May 1888, his daughter "Chrissie" and her children accompanied him for one day, and his young grandson, William Kelk Broughton, Jr. (aged 11 years) continued further until the remaining traveling party turned back to Moose Factory.

== Consecration ==
In the autumn of 1872, Horden received a message to return to England to be consecrated as a bishop. Elizabeth remained behind to look after the affairs at Moose Factory. On December 15, 1872, he and two others were ordained in a ceremony at Westminster Abbey involving eight other bishops, including Bishop Anderson, who had first ordained Horden 20 years earlier.

Horden served as bishop for a huge territory, and made pastoral visits to as many parts of the diocese as possible, including York Factory via Winnipeg, despite his having a serious problem with rheumatism. Once the bishop arrived at these distant parishes, he had a full day that could include, an early morning service in Cree, then a service in Inuit, later another Cree service that would include marriages and baptisms, then later, the English service. Over the course of forty-one years, Horden built five Anglican churches to serve the diocese. New construction at Moose Factory was undertaken in 1856 for St. Thomas' Anglican Church to replace an older building, but it was carried nearly a quarter-mile in a flood in 1860. Construction resumed in 1864, but was not completed until 1885.

In his later years, he also worked diligently to finish his translation of the Bible into the Cree language, and also Ojibwa, Inuktitut, Chipewyan, and Norwegian (the language of some Hudson's Bay Company employees). Horden wrote several books and his "A grammar of the Cree language, as spoken by the Cree Indians of North America" (London, 1881) is considered one of his most significant linguistic achievements.

== Death and legacy ==
On November 21, 1892, the pain was more acute than ever, and despite the care and assistance of his family, his health continued to wane. John Horden died on January 12, 1893, and was buried in the Hudson's Bay Company graveyard in Moose Factory, beside his infant daughter Ellen Hudson Horden (1860–1861) and infant grandson Henry Seward Broughton (1883), who died from a whooping cough epidemic at the Albany post.

There is a monument to Horden (1895), under a canopy on the North Wall of Nave, Cathedral Church of Saint Peter at Exeter. Three 1893 design sketches for the memorial by sculptor Herbert Read, depicting an island scene of the bishop and natives, are held at the Devon Heritage Centre.

St. John's Hospital School on High Street, Exeter, where Horden attended the English Free School as a child, erected a monument to Horden in the wall, inscribed with a biography and closing with "Faithful unto Death". Little remained of the building after it was bombed in May 1942.

In 1938, a replacement building for the mission school (first opened by Horden in 1855) was named "Bishop Horden Memorial School", and this was replaced in 1953 by a building named "Horden Hall". By 1964 classes at Horden Hall were phased out as students attended public school and the hall served only as a hostel.

The Calendar of Saints of the Anglican Church of Canada remembers his service on January 12.

== See also ==
- St. Thomas' Anglican Church (Moose Factory, Ontario)
- Photographs of Moose Fort Indian Residential School (Bishop Horden Memorial – Horden Hall)
