= Bishop Horden Memorial School =

Coordinates: 51.2502°N 80.6146°W

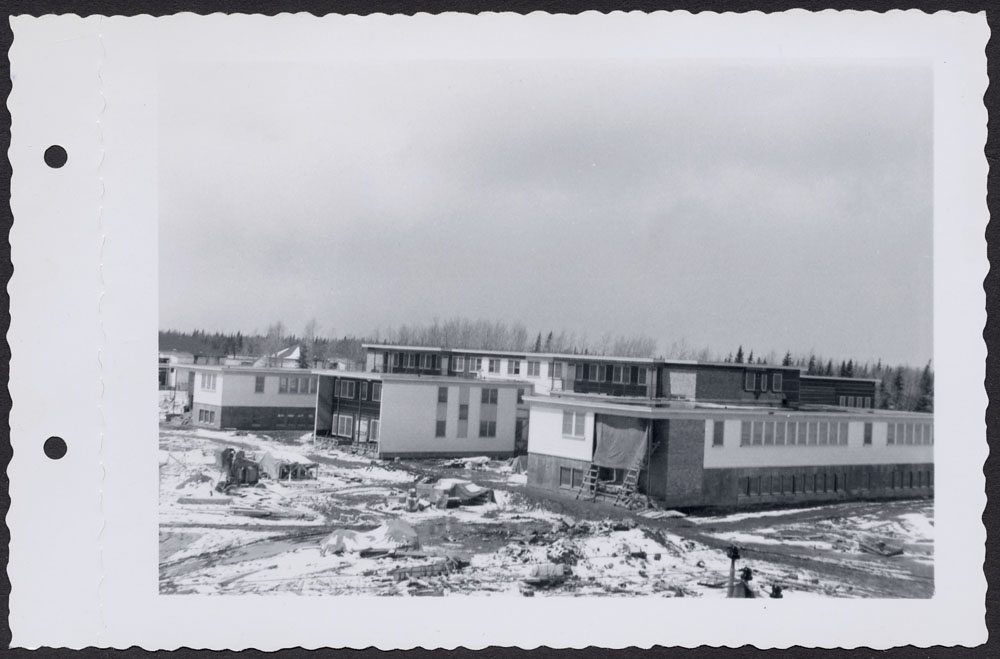

Information
- Other names: Bishop Horden Hall; Bishop Horden Memorial School; Moose Factory Residential School; Horden Hall
- School type: Residential school
- Established: 1906
- Closed: 1976
- Enrollment: 107 (1976)

Bishop Horden Hall, also known as Bishop Horden Memorial School, Moose Factory Residential School, and Horden Hall, was a residential school that operated from 1906 until 1976 on Moose Factory Island, at the southern end of James Bay, at the bottom of Hudson Bay, in northern Ontario.

During its 70 years, Horden Hall was known by nine names and operated out of several different buildings. Bishop Horden Hall is the name used for the school in the 2006 Indian Residential Schools Settlement Agreement (IRSSA), in which the Government of Canada acknowledged the damage done to Indigenous people who attended residential schools, and established a $1.9-billion compensation package to compensate them for the harms they suffered.

Between 1906 and 1927, an average of 25 children lived at the school. Residency peaked between 1957 and 1958, with 251 children. When the school closed in 1976, there were 107 children living there.

== History ==
The first inhabitants of the James Bay region were Cree people, who hunted and gathered in seasonal migrations throughout the area. In the summers, they would congregate and socialize on and near Moose Factory Island, before returning to their winter hunting and trapping grounds.

In 1670, Charles II of England gave control of all lands draining into Hudson Bay to "the Governor and Company of Adventurers of England trading into Hudson Bay," which later became known as the Hudson's Bay Company. In 1673, the company established a trading post on the island.

In 1806, the Hudson’s Bay Company established a school in Moose Factory that was attended by eight children of company employees and their “country wives.”

In 1851, the Church Missionary Society decided to establish a permanent mission on the island, and recruited English schoolteacher John Horden to run it. He and his wife Elizabeth Horden arrived on the island in 1852, and in 1855 opened a day school there for Cree children, on land the Hudson's Bay Company allowed the Church to use. The day school bought food and other goods from the Hudson's Bay Company, and the company's local coastal steamers transported Cree children from their home communities to the school, where they were "boarded out" to local families during the school year. A book about Horden published in 1893 says that at one point in the school's history, pre-1872, it had a "native master."

In 1872, Horden was consecrated as the first Anglican Bishop of Moosonee, a role in which he served until his death in 1893. He had been fluent in Cree and could speak Ojibway, Inuktitut, and Chipewyan, and had translated many Christian writings into Cree syllabics.

== Years of operation ==
In 1905, on behalf of the King of England, treaty commissioners started signing Treaty No. 9 with the Anishinaabe (Algonquin and Ojibway) and Omushkegowuk Cree peoples of the James Bay area. Signed by the Moose Factory Cree in August, the treaty established the Factory Island Indian Reserve on the northern two-thirds of the island, and also committed the Crown to providing education for the children of treaty signatories.

In 1905, the Missionary Society of the Church of England opened Moose Fort Boarding School. In 1906, it started to receive funding from the Canadian government to operate the school, at which point the school became part of the residential school system. Some non-status Cree children attended the school, but the Canadian government did not pay any of their costs.

Initially, Cree parents wanted their children to go to school, because they wanted them to have access to education. Later, many came to see the school as harmful to their children, but didn't take them out because the Indian Act, as of 1920, required children to attend school until they turned 16, which the RCMP started to enforce in the 1930s. Starting in the 1950s, some Cree families began moving to Moose Factory so their children could attend day school instead of Horden Hall.

In 1937, the Church built a new residential school planned to house 100 children, for which the federal government provided desks and blackboards. The buildings were officially occupied December 29 and included a two-storey annex. On the ground floor the annex contained the laundry, the boys and girls washrooms, and the boys recreation room. The second storey consisted of two large classrooms. The annex was connected to the main building by a twenty foot long closed and covered passageway.

In 1951 the Canadian government bought the school buildings from the Bishop of Moosonee, returned the land and its buildings to the Hudson's Bay Company, and then, in 1952, bought them back. In 1952 the government built a new dormitory, and in 1955 it built another one.

On June 30, 1976, the school's last incarnation, Horden Hall Student Residence, was closed.

The Moose Factory Band asked the government to transfer the building to them for their use, but the Department of Public Works declined, citing its high operating cost, and also that the Hudson's Bay Company’s rights meant the building could not be used for commercial purposes. However, the government did give the band the building's surplus furniture. In 1983, the building was demolished.

During its years of operation, Bishop Horden Memorial School was known by these names: Moose Fort Boarding School (1907-1922), Moose Factory Boarding School (1907-1919), Moose Fort Indian Residential School (1923-1964), Bishop Horden Memorial School and Bishop Horden Memorial Indian Residential School (1937-1955), Moose Factory Indian Residential School (1931, 1941, 1947 ), Horden Hall and Horden Hall Hostel (1964-1968), and Horden Hall Student Residence (1968 to 1976).

=== Education ===
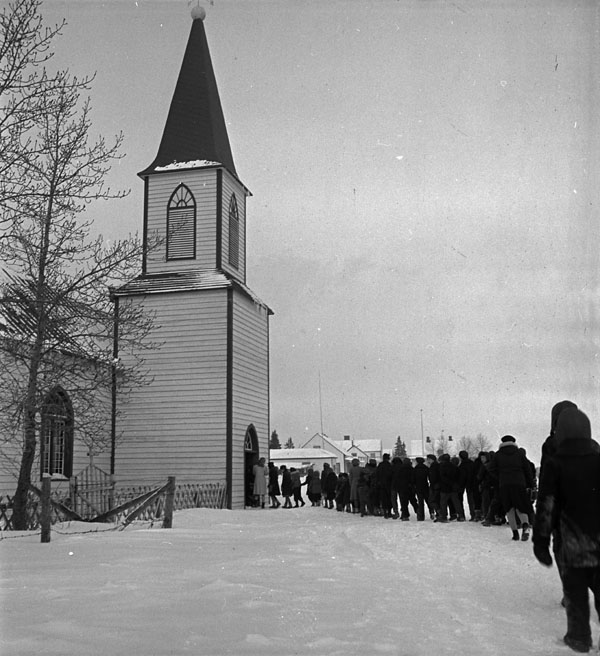
Cree children from Bishop Horden Hall attend service at St. Thomas' Anglican Church in Moose Factory Island, in 1946

For most of its history, the school taught Grades 1 to 8. From 1948-1950 and 1952-1959, it also taught kindergarten. Student attended the Moose Factory School from a number of the communities along the cost of James Bay and from the Albany River region. Communities included: Attawapiskat, Fort Albany, Marten Falls, Chapleau, Fort Hope, Moose Factory, East Main, Fort McKenzie, La Sarre, Nemiska, Rupert's House, Waswanipi, Great Whale River, Fort George, Mistassini, Pointe Blue, Senneterre, Coral Rapids, Island Falls, Peterbelle, and Oskalaneo.

The Truth and Reconciliation Commission found that as educational institutions, the residential schools were failures, and much of what went on in classrooms was simply repetitive drill. The teachers were hired by the Church, which placed a greater priority on religious commitment than on teaching ability, and because the pay was so low, many lacked qualifications. An oral history of Horden Hall survivors found that most didn't have strong memories of their teachers, and didn't consider them "significant adults" in their lives.

Because Indian Affairs wanted the schools to be self-sufficient, children were expected to raise or grow and prepare most of the food they ate, to make and repair most of their own clothing, and to maintain the school buildings. Until the 1950s, children at Horden Hall spent only half their day in classes, and the other half working. Boys worked in the gardens and barns, and in the bush cutting firewood, and girls cooked, cleaned, and did laundry.

The school put a heavy emphasis on religion. A survivor who was at the school in the 1960s remembers "prayers in the morning, prayers at breakfast, prayers after breakfast, prayers before lunch, prayers at lunch, prayers after lunch, prayers before supper, prayers at supper, prayers after supper, and prayers before we went to bed." Children at Horden Hall were required to attend two religious services each Sunday.

In 1947 a trapping program was established at the School. Under the guidance of community member Daniel Sailors a handful of boy students learned and worked on a local trap line. Boys included in this program included Peter Cheechoo, Sampson Koostan, Lawrence Mark, James Sutherland, George Mark, William Cheechoo, Billy Nischoshie, James Cheechoo, and Robert Vincent.

In 1952, the Department of Indian Affairs decided that high school aged students be transferred to the Shingwauk Indian Residential School in Sault Ste, Marie, Ontario to complete their schooling.

=== Language ===
Early missionaries to Canada had been expected to learn the languages of the people they were trying to convert, and to carry out much of their work in those languages. But when the federal government got involved in the education of Indigenous children through the establishment of residential schools, its goal was to assimilate Indigenous children into European-Canadian society, including by suppressing the children's use of Indigenous languages. If during their visits government inspectors heard children speaking Indigenous languages they criticized the principal, and inspectors considered it a great accomplishment if they could report that children had forgotten how to speak their native tongue. Many residential schools completely forbade children from speaking their Indigenous language, and punished them if they did.

At Horden Hall, Horden's influence was still being felt as late as 1910, when Indian Affairs records show the school was still conducting Sunday services in both English and Cree. However, many survivors of the school have described being punished for speaking Cree, and it's well-known that children left Horden Hall with less Cree fluency than when they arrived.

=== Food ===
At home, the children had been raised on food their parents had hunted, fished, or harvested.

At school, they found the European-style food "disorienting," and were often hungry. They regularly stole fruit, bread, and peanut butter from the school kitchen. One survivor remembered losing weight during the school year, and gaining it back when she went home in the summers.

=== Illness and death ===
The school was chronically under-resourced and relied on infrastructure that often needed repair. One day in July 1919, twelve boys capsized in the school's rotten canoe while returning from picking berries on an island in the Moose River. Five boys were able to get to safety until help came, but the other seven drowned. The Department of Indian Affairs encouraged the school staff not to blame themselves, while the Moose Factory community was outraged: the chief and three others sent an impassioned letter to Duncan Campbell Scott, deputy superintendent general of Indian Affairs, demanding justice. The letter was translated by a commissioner at Timiskaming, who watered down the men's demands and nothing came of them.^{:129-130}

School records document that tuberculosis, influenza, and pleurisy were sometimes present.

In 1921, according to a government report, several children were very badly affected by tuberculosis and "gland trouble." One died of TB and another was paralyzed. One was placed in a tent and not expected to live, although what happened to him or her was not recorded.

In 1930, a child died of tuberculosis.

In 1933, two boys died of tuberculosis.

In 1940, two boys died of tubercular meningitis. The Indian agent reported that one boy’s family was "not notified of sickness or death of child as there was no way to send word."

In 1941, a girl died of generalized tuberculosis, and two other children died of pulmonary tuberculosis.

In 1942, two children died of pulmonary tuberculosis.

In 1943, a girl died of acute pulmonary meningitis.

In 1945, a boy died of tuberculosis meningitis.

In 1946, a girl died of tuberculosis meningitis.

In 1948, a boy died of tuberculosis.

In 1951, a boy died of tuberculosis meningitis.

In 1965, a boy died, but the cause was not recorded.

The National Centre for Truth and Reconciliation's National Student Memorial Register lists 25 students who are known to have died at the school.

=== Discipline, punishments and abuse ===
Horden Hall survivors remember the school as a cold, isolating, rigidly controlled environment in which they often felt lonely and missed their home communities. They remember not being allowed to speak during meals, being required to stay inside a fenced area when they were outside, and not being allowed to talk with siblings, family members, or friends.

Survivors describe the school atmosphere as being like a "military school," "the army," "a jail," "a reform school," "a detention centre" or "a penitentiary," and they describe themselves as having been treated like "criminals." One survivor who was at Horden Hall in the 1960s remembers village children taunting residential school children from the other side of the school fence, saying "you're in jail."

In Cree communities, children had been part of an interdependent multi-generational group. They had been taught by example and by storytelling, and physical punishment was rare. Horden Hall was different. Upon arrival, the children's possessions were taken, and their hair cut off. Children were assigned a number that was affixed to the objects the school provided for them, such as their bed, school uniforms, and toothbrush. They were separated from their siblings.

Survivors remember having been punished for many reasons, including for speaking Cree, talking in line, being late, making too much noise, wetting the bed, not performing chores properly, not being neat enough, not finishing their food, stealing food, switching beds with another child, wearing pants instead of a dress, making a mistake, leaving school grounds without permission, talking with village children through the fence, trying to run away, fighting with other children, crying, and "for no reason at all." As punishment, they remember losing their privileges or being assigned extra chores, being sent to bed without dinner, having their mouths washed out with soap, being made to stand or sit in the snow for long periods of time, being made to clean the school's stairs and stairwell and playroom with a toothbrush, and being spanked, shoved, poked with a knitting needle, slapped, punched, and strapped.

Government and church records document three allegations of abuse at Bishop Horden Hall.

In 1912, Mary A. Johnson, a school matron, wrote Indian Affairs saying the school's principal William Haythornthwaite had "cruelly whipped" two girls, leaving their hands "discoloured for days," and that he had at other times "chased the girls around their bedrooms." Indian Affairs exonerated the principal, though they questioned his actions, the Bishop at Indian Affairs noting that he had been "summoned to see a third child die."^{:126} The matron and another employee resigned, and the principal remained at the school until 1921.

In 1949, the superintendent of the James Bay Indian Agency requested an RCMP investigation into allegations that the school's principal had "severely strapped" two students. A medical investigation and RCMP investigation were carried out, and the district nurse told investigators that she had “noticed the patients there are very thin, and I do believe that these children are not being cared for properly due to the number of children who are becoming ill there.” No charges were laid.

In 1956, the superintendent of the Abitibi Indian Agency informed the government of accusations of ill treatment of Mistassini children at the school. The allegations included physical abuse and inadequate food. The Superintendent of the James Bay Indian Agency and the principal of the school denied the charges.

Survivors have told other stories of abuse to researchers. One described being sexually threatened by a school supervisor, and said a different supervisor regularly took showers with the children. Another survivor described having her head shoved into a toilet by a supervisor, breaking her glasses, and being chased around the dining room by a school employee who said he wanted to kiss her. A survivor said that when he was 11 years old and had a sore stomach, a teacher rubbed his penis and told him "this will help." A survivor described a teacher kicking and hitting a student who was having a seizure. Another described a supervisor bringing children into his bedroom and "fondling" them. A survivor remembers a friend from school telling him, years later, that the school principal had sexually assaulted the friend in the principal's office.

In its 2012 narrative history of Horden Hall, produced as part of the IRSSA settlement, the government of Canada notes that it is unaware of any convictions for abuse at the school, or of any convicted abusers present at the school.

=== Running away ===
It was common for children to try to run away from residential schools, and many survivors have told stories about trying to escape Horden Hall by climbing the fence or digging underneath it.

In November 1943, two boys who ran away walked 24 miles to the camp of one of their parents, until they were overtaken by police and returned to the school by train.

When children ran away, the Indian supervisor or the RCMP would come to find them. One survivor has described hiding under the blankets at his mother's and uncle's, hoping to avoid being returned to the school.

== Effects of the school on survivors ==
Horden Hall survivors suffered many negative effects from their time there.

Many say the school taught them to believe that being Indigenous meant they were "bad" and "had no morals," and they grew to be ashamed of their family and community.

They lost proficiency in Cree, and their ability to learn how to hunt and trap was interrupted. After leaving the school, many felt unable to fit in anywhere, resentful, and lonely. Some former students killed themselves.

Many had difficulty as adults regaining closeness with their families, including, for some, because they blamed their parents for putting them in the school or not helping them to leave it.

Because they had left the school with less Cree proficiency than they had entered with, most couldn't teach Cree to their own children.

Because they hadn't been raised by their own parents, they found parenting difficult. Some deliberately showered their children with the affection, praise and individual attention that their own childhood had lacked, while others found it difficult to express love and warmth. Some raised their children in a deliberately permissive way as a result of their experiences at the school, but many felt they had learned discipline there, and modeled their own parenting on how they had been treated. A few told researchers they sometimes got angry and lost control with their own children, in the same way school supervisors had with them.

Their strict, regimented experiences at Horden Hall, survivors have said, trained them to keep their heads down and look out for their own interests, to be "individualized," "reclusive," and "self-centred and self-motivated and selfish," and led other First Nations people to describe them as "cold," "blunt," or "not having a heart." It was only later in life, several survivors said, that they were able to overcome their conditioning from school and behave in a more communal and interdependent way.

Here is how one researcher summarized survivor life experiences after leaving school: "As adults, their life experiences after Horden Hall have some remarkable similarities: prolonged absence from family and community after residential school(s); a difficulty reestablishing ties of closeness with their family of origin; a period of anomie in which feelings of hopelessness, anger, frustration and ambivalence over Native identity manifested itself in bouts of partying and drinking; a point at which they settled down, sometimes accompanied by an awakening to the existence of a community and, more specifically, a generation of children, who need them."
