= Moose Factory =

Community in Ontario, Canada

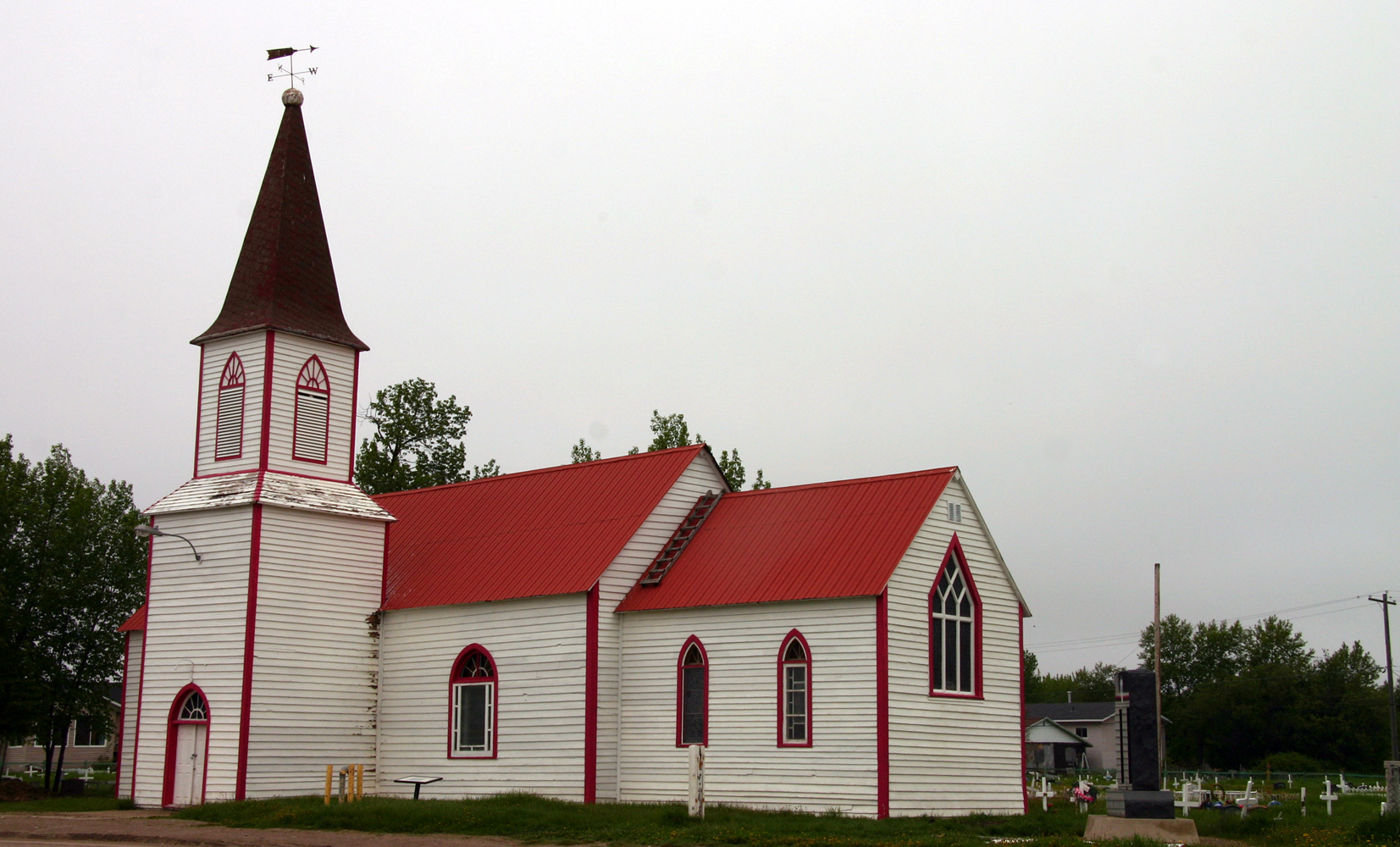
- St. Thomas' Anglican Church
- Nickname: Moose Antlers
- Location within Ontario
- Coordinates: 51°15′20″N 80°36′18″W
- Country: Canada
- Province: Ontario
- Region: Northeastern Ontario
- District: Cochrane
- Settled: 1673
- Renamed: 1686

Government
  - Type: multiple governments
  - Federal riding: Timmins-James Bay
  - Prov. riding: Mushkegowuk—James Bay

Area
  - Land: 5.25 km^{2} (2.03 sq mi)
- Elevation: 7 m (23 ft)

Population (2006)
  - Total: 2,458
  - Density: 473.3/km^{2} (1,226/sq mi)
- Time zone: UTC−5 (EST)
  - Summer (DST): UTC−4 (EDT)
- Postal code: P0L 1W0
- Area code: 705

Moose Factory is a community in the Cochrane District, Ontario, Canada. It is located on Moose Factory Island, near the mouth of the Moose River, which is at the southern end of James Bay. It was the first English-speaking settlement in lands now making up Ontario and the second Hudson's Bay Company post to be set up in North America after Fort Rupert.

The settlement is mainly inhabited by the Moose Cree of Moose Cree First Nation, (Note: Moose Cree: ᒨᓱᓂᔨ ᐃᓕᓕᐗᒃ môsoniyi ililiwak; formerly Moose Factory Band of Indians) the northern two-thirds of the island being governed by the First Nation as the Factory Island 1 reserve. However, Weeneebayko General Hospital, which provides healthcare services to the people of the island and surrounding area, lies outside of the reserve lands and employs a diverse group of people. In all, the community has between 2,300 and 3,900 residents as of 2026.

The term "factory" refers to the jurisdiction of a factor (a business agent or merchant in charge of buying or selling) of the Hudson's Bay Company.

== History ==
The Cree are an indigenous people of the Subarctic, who historically hunted and gathered in seasonal migrations. In summer, they travelled on waterways by canoe: fishing and harvesting berries and other food staples. In fall, they hunted waterfowl along the shores of James Bay, including in the area of present-day Moose Factory. Prior to winter, Cree families travelled to their winter settlements, where they hunted and trapped big game and small, fur-bearing animals. Prior to spring thaw, the families hunted waterfowl as they migrated north. This was an historical, annual cycle for the Moose Cree prior to European colonization of the Americas.

=== Fur trade ===
The first European to explore the area was Pierre-Esprit Radisson, an employee of the Hudson's Bay Company (HBC), in the winter of 1670/71, setting out from the base at Rupert House (present-day Waskaganish). In 1673, Charles Bayly, overseas governor of the Hudson's Bay Company, established a fur-trading post called Moose Fort. The fort was located on traditional Môsonîw Ililiw (Moose Cree) lands. To more easily trade with the Europeans in the fort, Cree congregated in and around the fur trade post and became exposed to European customs.

Early exposure to European society heavily influenced Cree lifestyles. According to the Government of Canada, the Cree traded furs and also "supplied necessary provisions and labour ... throughout the 1700s".

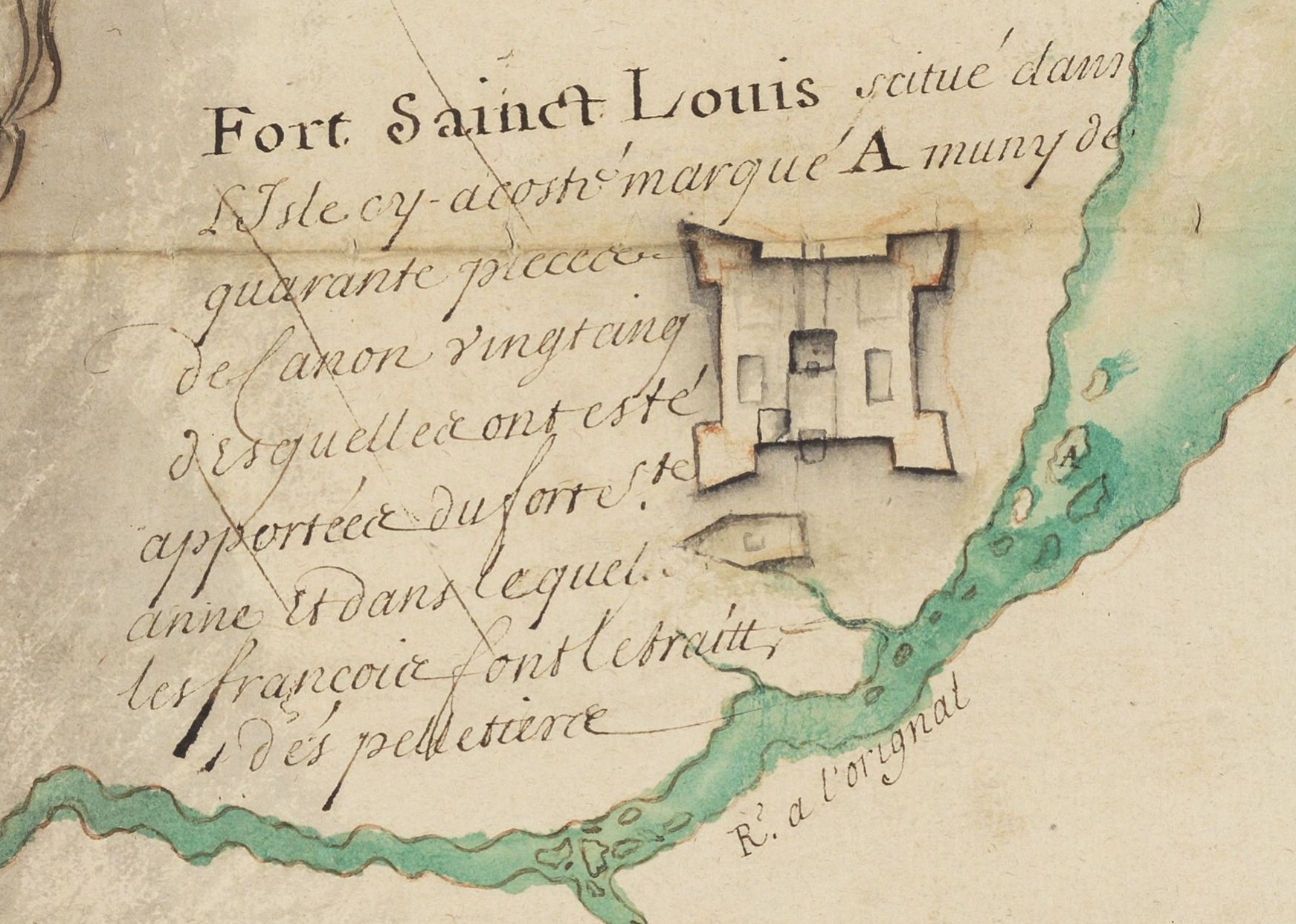
Moose Fort was known as Fort St Louis after its capture by de Troyes; it was recaptured by the British in 1696

In addition to trading, the site was also intended to protect the company's interests from French traders to the south. The fort was profitable and had a negative impact on the fur trade in New France. So in 1686, the Chevalier de Troyes led a small contingent of French soldiers north on an expedition to raid Hudson's Bay Company forts. The English defenders were caught by total surprise and surrendered. The French captured Moose Fort and renamed it to Fort St. Louis. After ten years of French control, the English recaptured the fort in 1696 and burned it to the ground. No trace has remained of this original fort. In 1713, after the English and French exchanged control of the fort a few more times, the site was formally given to the British under the Treaty of Utrecht but it was not reoccupied for almost two decades.

The Hudson's Bay Company set up a new fort in 1730, one mile upstream from the old site, to accommodate Cree traders for whom travel to the other James Bay posts (including Fort Albany) was too dangerous. Five years later, this new fort was destroyed by a fire that started in the kitchen. It was rebuilt over a period of seven years.

=== End of the fur trade ===
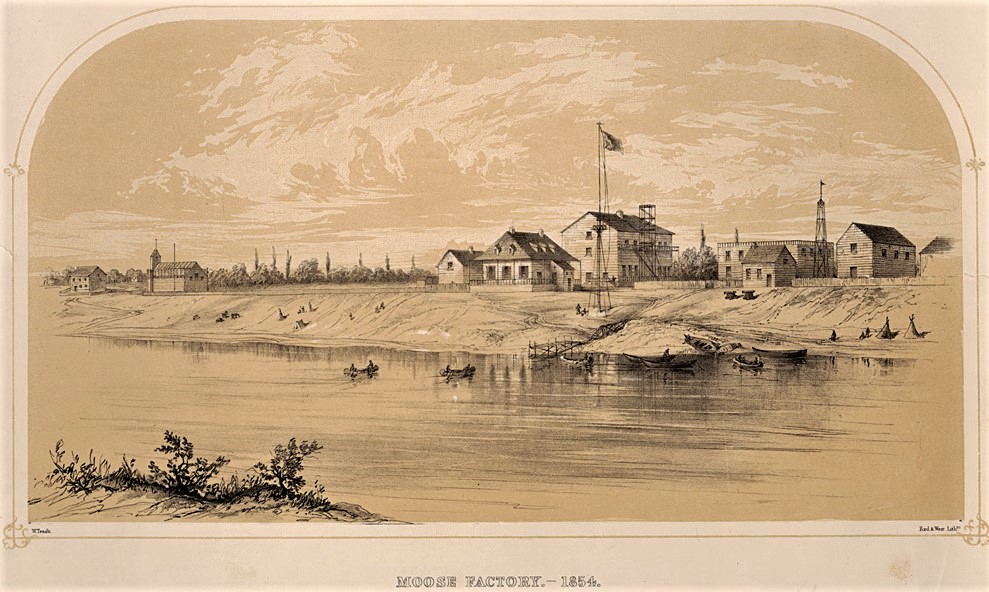
Moose Factory 1854

In 1821, when the Hudson's Bay Company merged with the rival North West Company, there were no longer any serious threats and the post expanded beyond the fort's palisades. Thereafter it came to be known as Moose Factory. It became HBC's main base on James Bay, being the administrative headquarters of the Southern Department as of the early 1800s. The Governor of Rupert's Land and Council met frequently there to plan for the coming year's operations.

In 1851, Anglican Bishop John Horden arrived in town to establish a school at the request of the Company. The school was built on the southwest end of the island, a precursor to Bishop Horden Memorial School. Students came from as far as Attawapiskat, and were initially boarded in homes on the mainland, before it became a true residential school.^{:113-4, 122}

=== Treaty No. 9 ===
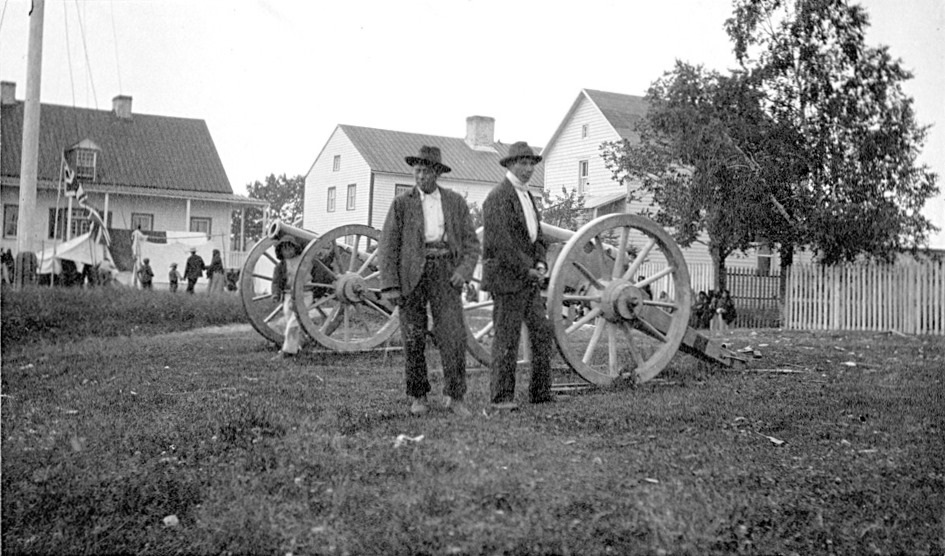
Moose Factory the day after the signing of Treaty 9. Note the Treaty Commissioners' annuities tent in the background.

In 1905, on behalf of the British Crown, treaty commissioners presented a treaty to the Cree living near Moose Factory. Treaty No. 9 was signed on 9 August 1905. The treaty defined two tracts of land to be set aside for use and "benefit" of Moose Cree First Nation, which was established as a band council under the Indian Act.

=== 20th century ===
Around the same time, the Parisian furrier company Revillon Frères set up a trading post on the west bank of the Moose River. This post, first known as Moose River Post, grew into the town of Moosonee and provided stiff competition to the HBC Moose Factory post.

On December 14, 1920, the three-man crew of U.S. Navy air balloon A-5598 crash-landed around thirty kilometres northeast of Moose Factory, having been blown adrift during a storm. The men spent four days in the forest before making it to town.^{:131}

Isolated until 1931, the community was finally connected by the Temiskaming and Northern Ontario Railway to Moosonee and it developed a service economy. Supplies could be delivered from the south by train, thereby making redundant the once-yearly sea voyages on which the settlement had previously relied. The last supply ship arrived in 1936.

After World War II, the Hudson's Bay Company transformed into a retail business, and in 1960 it opened a modern retail store in Moose Factory. The HBC staff house and other historic properties were converted into the open-air museum of Centennial Park that opened in 1967. The HBC continued to operate in Moose Factory until 1987, when its operations in northern Canada, including Moose Factory, were sold to The North West Company. Today, the North West Company operates the Northern Store, a grocery and general goods store at the Moose Cree Complex selling "food, as well as general merchandise such as clothing, electronics and housewares" near some of the historic HBC buildings.

In 2005, Patricia Faries-Akiwenzie, a practising lawyer from Moose Factory, became the first woman to be elected as Chief of Moose Cree First Nation.

== Geography ==
Moose Factory Island
- Interactive map of Moose Factory Island

Geography
- Location: Moose River
- Coordinates: 51°15′48″N 80°35′56″W
- Area: 5.25 km^{2} (2.03 sq mi)
- Length: 4.1 km (2.55 mi)
- Width: 1.4 km (0.87 mi)
- Coastline: 9.5 km (5.9 mi)
- Highest elevation: 5.5 m (18 ft)

Administration
- Canada
- Province: Ontario
- District: Cochrane

The community is located on Moose Factory Island, an island in Moose River about 6 km (3.7 mi) from its mouth at James Bay. Politically, the northern two-thirds of the island are controlled by the Moose Cree First Nation band government as the Factory Island 1 reserve, while the southern third is part of the Unorganized Cochrane District of Ontario. The border of these two political entities runs halfway between Museum Street and Nabechich Street.

Moose Factory Island is part of the poorly drained, sparsely forested Hudson Bay Lowlands. It is flat and made up of marine clay, underlain by sedimentary rocks, mainly limestone, dolomite and shale. Being situated close to James Bay, Moose Factory Island is affected by the Arctic tides which rise and fall twice daily, varying as much as 2.5 m (8 ft 2 in) from high to low tide. As in other James Bay communities, the annual Spring thaw and break-up of ice on the river can lead to dangerous floods and ice floes.^{:115}

The north end of the island is tree covered land.

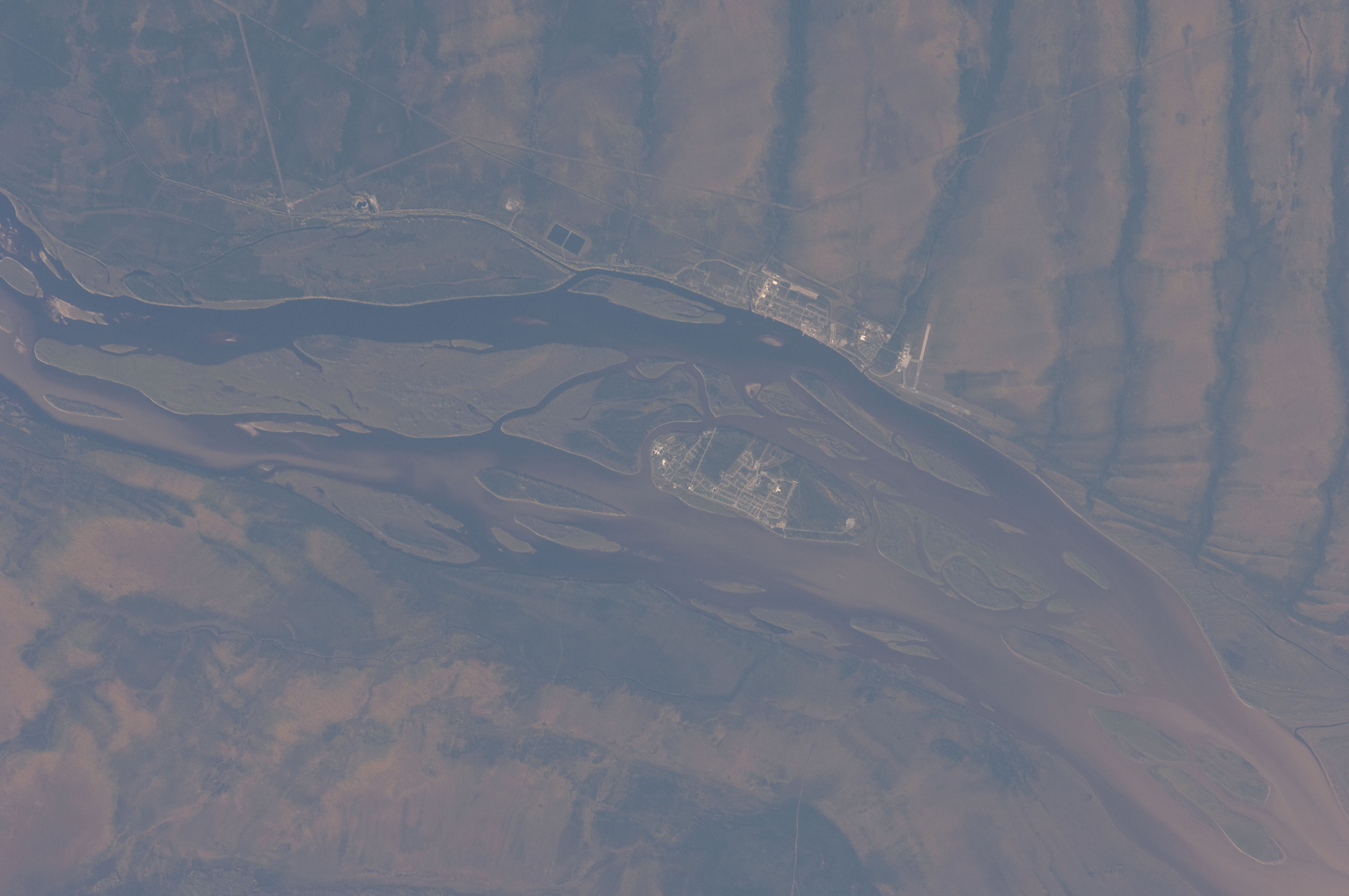
Moose River photographed during ISS Expedition 20 on October 10, 2009. Moose Factory Island is visible in the centre of the image, with Moosonee visible on the west (upper) bank of the river.

=== Climate ===
The Moose Factory and Moosonee area has a very cold humid continental climate (Köppen Dfb). The climate data is from Moosonee, around 3 km (1.9 mi) to the west.

Climate data for Moosonee (Moosonee Upper Air (UA)) WMO ID: 71836; coordinates 51°16′N 80°39′W; elevation: 10.0 m (32.8 ft); 1991–2020 normals, extremes 1877–present (Note: Long term climate data for the Moosonee area was recorded in Moose Factory from October 1877 to December 1938, and in Moosonee from October 1932 to present.)
Month	Jan	Feb	Mar	Apr	May	Jun	Jul	Aug	Sep	Oct	Nov	Dec	Year
Record high °C (°F)	7.2 (45.0)	10.6 (51.1)	24.5 (76.1)	27.9 (82.2)	34.2 (93.6)	37.1 (98.8)	37.8 (100.0)	35.0 (95.0)	36.3 (97.3)	30.0 (86.0)	20.5 (68.9)	13.2 (55.8)	37.8 (100.0)
Mean daily maximum °C (°F)	−13.0 (8.6)	−10.8 (12.6)	−4.0 (24.8)	3.8 (38.8)	12.7 (54.9)	19.8 (67.6)	22.9 (73.2)	21.6 (70.9)	16.9 (62.4)	8.9 (48.0)	0.1 (32.2)	−8.8 (16.2)	5.8 (42.4)
Daily mean °C (°F)	−18.7 (−1.7)	−17.4 (0.7)	−11.0 (12.2)	−2.2 (28.0)	6.4 (43.5)	12.7 (54.9)	16.3 (61.3)	15.5 (59.9)	11.3 (52.3)	4.9 (40.8)	−3.6 (25.5)	−13.5 (7.7)	0.1 (32.2)
Mean daily minimum °C (°F)	−24.4 (−11.9)	−23.9 (−11.0)	−18.0 (−0.4)	−8.1 (17.4)	0.1 (32.2)	5.7 (42.3)	9.8 (49.6)	9.4 (48.9)	5.8 (42.4)	0.6 (33.1)	−7.5 (18.5)	−18.2 (−0.8)	−5.7 (21.7)
Record low °C (°F)	−48.9 (−56.0)	−47.8 (−54.0)	−44.4 (−47.9)	−33.9 (−29.0)	−17.8 (0.0)	−7.0 (19.4)	−2.2 (28.0)	−3.1 (26.4)	−6.1 (21.0)	−16.7 (1.9)	−34.4 (−29.9)	−44.4 (−47.9)	−48.9 (−56.0)
Average precipitation mm (inches)	34.8 (1.37)	31.1 (1.22)	33.0 (1.30)	37.1 (1.46)	65.9 (2.59)	68.1 (2.68)	90.0 (3.54)	80.4 (3.17)	90.5 (3.56)	71.6 (2.82)	53.7 (2.11)	43.6 (1.72)	699.7 (27.55)
Average rainfall mm (inches)	1.0 (0.04)	1.0 (0.04)	3.9 (0.15)	19.6 (0.77)	58.9 (2.32)	67.1 (2.64)	90.3 (3.56)	80.4 (3.17)	89.9 (3.54)	66.2 (2.61)	20.6 (0.81)	3.7 (0.15)	502.8 (19.80)
Average snowfall cm (inches)	35.9 (14.1)	32.7 (12.9)	30.4 (12.0)	15.8 (6.2)	3.4 (1.3)	0.0 (0.0)	0.0 (0.0)	0.0 (0.0)	0.4 (0.2)	6.5 (2.6)	37.9 (14.9)	48.5 (19.1)	211.4 (83.2)
Average precipitation days (≥ 0.2 mm)	13.2	11.0	8.8	9.7	13.2	12.4	16.2	16.2	17.1	16.6	15.4	15.3	165.1
Average rainy days (≥ 0.2 mm)	0.52	0.38	1.4	4.6	12.2	12.4	16.2	16.4	17.1	14.6	5.2	1.2	102.1
Average snowy days (≥ 0.2 cm)	11.9	9.6	7.6	5.7	1.9	0.04	0.0	0.0	0.05	3.1	11.3	13.6	64.7
Average relative humidity (%) (at 1500 LST)	71.9	64.9	59.5	59.7	60.7	59.1	61.6	63.6	65.3	69.3	76.1	77.9	65.8
Mean monthly sunshine hours	93.6	128.7	161.6	192.0	221.2	213.5	249.2	219.7	134.8	88.5	52.9	55.2	1,810.7
Percentage possible sunshine	35.8	45.7	44.0	46.3	45.9	43.1	50.0	48.6	35.4	26.6	19.7	22.3	38.6
Source: Environment and Climate Change Canada (sun 1981–2010)

== Demographics ==
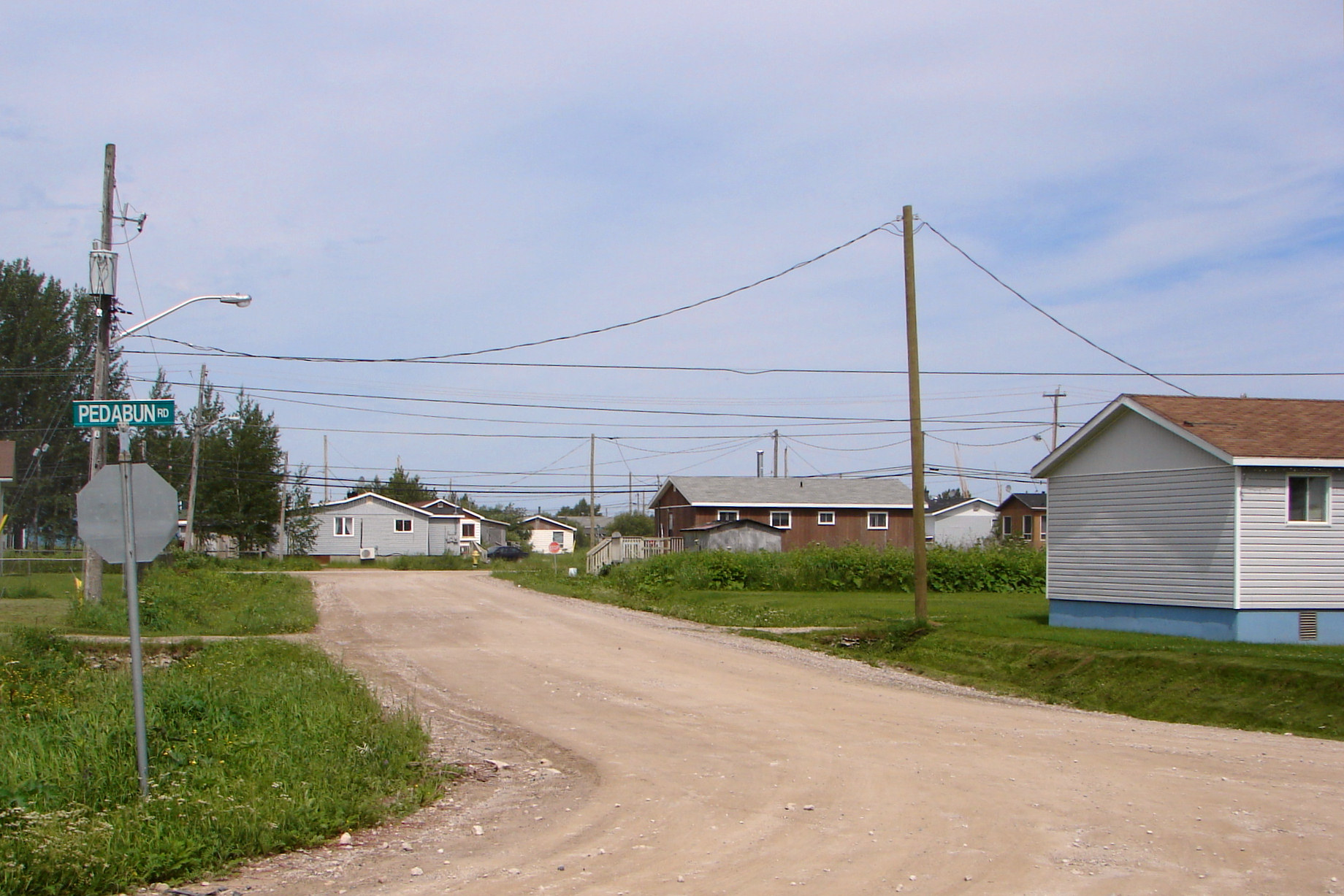
Typical residential street in Factory Island 1 Indian Reserve, Moose Factory.

Given that the community does not have one unified government, accurate population reporting is challenging.

The 2021 Canadian census reported that the designated place of Moose Factory South (the southern portion of the island, outside the reserve) had a population of 495 living in 168 of its 252 total private dwellings, a change of −26.3% from its 2016 population of 672. With a land area of 1.51 km^{2} (0.58 sq mi), it had a population density of 327.8/km^{2} (849.0/sq mi) in 2021.

Official reporting in April 2026 by Crown–Indigenous Relations and Northern Affairs Canada reports 1,829 members of MCFN living on reserve, 87 members living on other reserves or crown land, and 3,343 members living off reserve.

In spring 2026, when 1,000 community members evacuated due to flooding risks, the CBC reported that the community had a population of approximately 3,900.

The Moose Cree language is an endangered Cree language spoken primarily in and around Moose Factory, with approximately 3,000 native speakers as of 2007, according to Ethnologue.

== Economy ==
The economy of the island is based on the healthcare, service, tourism, and construction industries. The largest employer is the Weeneebayko General Hospital, followed by the band council and Northern Stores.

Northern Stores, G.G.'s and QuickStop are the main stores on the island. "The Complex" is the retail and community centre containing a grocery store (Northern Stores), a restaurant, a Canada Post outlet, a pharmacy, and offices.

== Arts and culture ==
Although few people practise a solely traditional lifestyle (i.e. living only off the land), the majority of people still participate in the spring and fall moose hunt. Traditional skills such as preparing and tanning of moose hides as well as the creation of moccasins and moose hide mitts with beading are still practised today. Other crafts practised in Moose Factory include the production of tamarack geese, snowshoes, and soapstone carvings which are sold locally.

== Attractions ==
Notable attractions include the Centennial Park with its 19th-century buildings associated with the Hudson's Bay Company post, Cree Cultural Interpretive Centre, the Cree Village Eco Lodge and St. Thomas' Anglican Church. Outdoor tourism in summer and winter, such as trap-line tours, canoe expeditions, and snowmobile trips, are locally provided. The Tidewater Provincial Park is nearby on the adjacent island facing Moosonee. Visitors also take freight canoe tours that leave from Moose Factory or Moosonee downstream to James Bay at the mouth of the river, or upstream to Fossil Island.

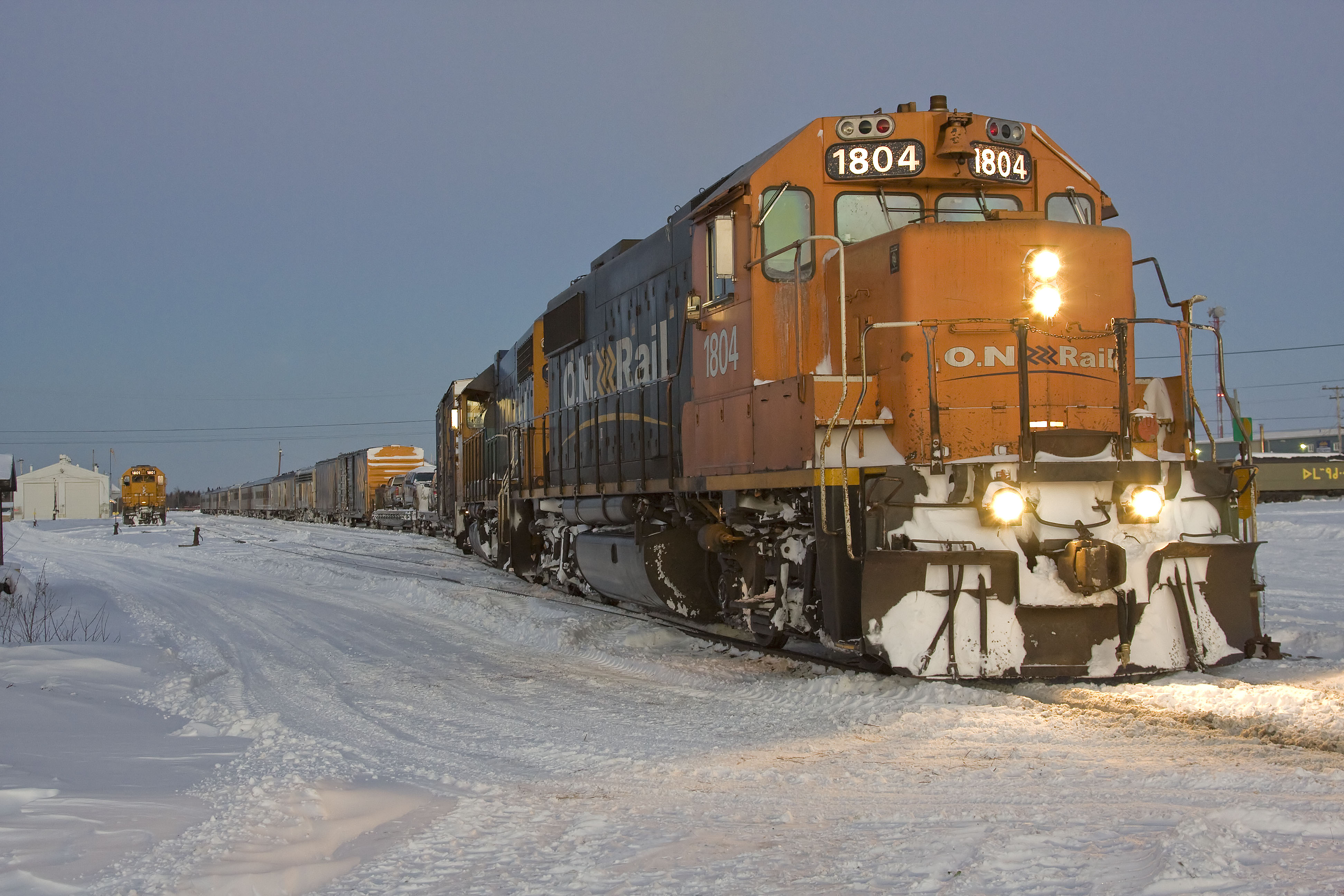
Polar Bear Express train

Tourism agencies recommend the Polar Bear Express as a "great rail excursion", between Cochrane, Ontario and Moosonee, to view the "hydroelectric dams, isolated homes and perhaps even some wildlife." The train, operated by Ontario Northland, offers passenger and freight service; tickets are sold by phone or at the offices Cochrane, Moosonee, Moose Factory and Timmins. The train will stop on demand in some locations as part of the flag stop service. Service on the Express operates six days a week in summer, and five days per week during other seasons. No meal service is available.

The Lonely Planet guide lists the Polar Bear Habitat & Heritage Village in Cochrane and the Cree Cultural Interpretive Centre as tourist attractions in the Cochrane to Moose Factory & Moosonee region.

Moose Cree First Nation Tourism indicates that available activities from members include boat, island and snowmobile tours, "traditional cooking, fishing (summer and winter)" and HBC historical tours.

=== Cree Cultural Interpretive Centre ===
Cree Cultural Interpretive Centre is an interpretive centre that displays many aspects of Cree culture and crafts.

=== Cree Eco Lodge ===
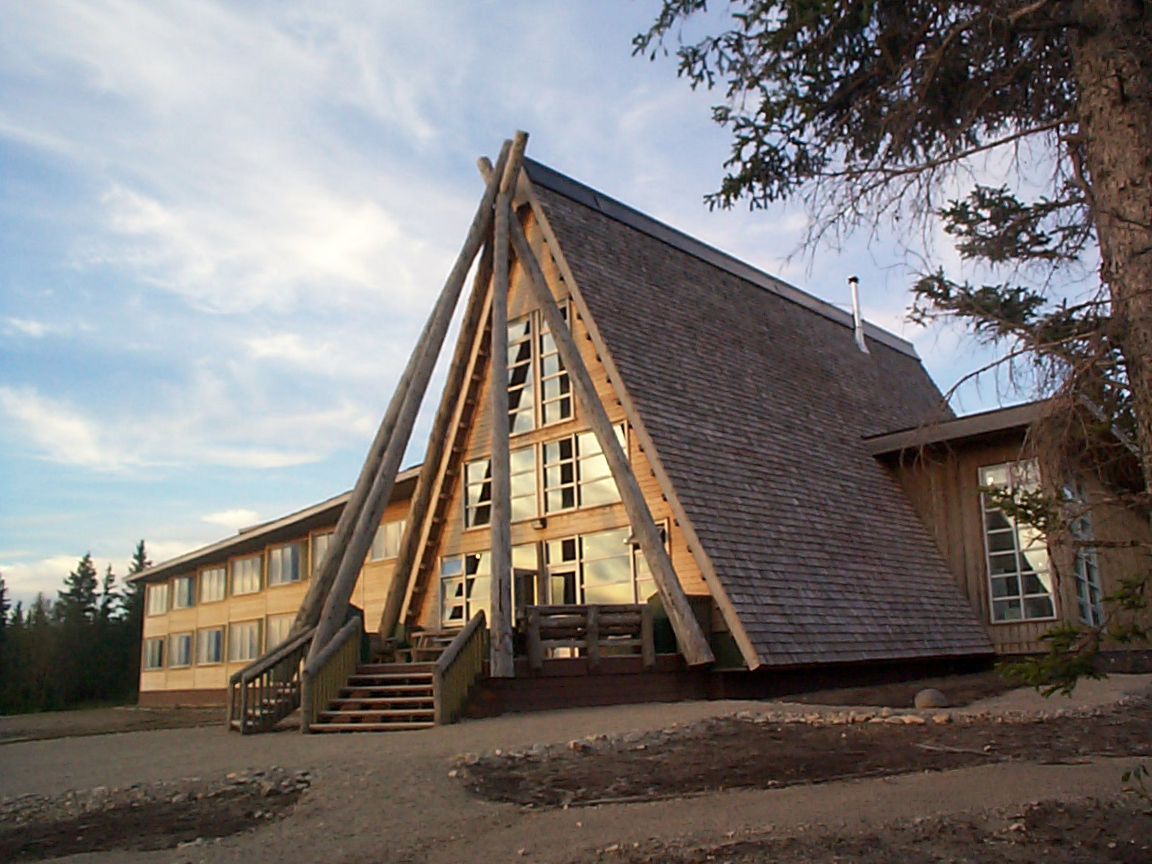
Cree Eco Lodge dining room

Cree Village Eco Lodge is an eco-tourist lodge with modern rooms and a restaurant; it opened in 2000. Traditional bannock and goose (in season) is prepared in a teepee adjacent to the lodge. From the lodge visitors can see Sawpit Island on the southern side of the canal and Charles Island on the opposite side of the canal.

Boat rides (for a fee) are available out the Moose River to James Bay, or "on fishing and canoeing trips to the Moose River Migratory Bird Sanctuary and the Cree Cultural Interpretive Centre". Other types of boat tours are also available.

=== Centennial Park ===
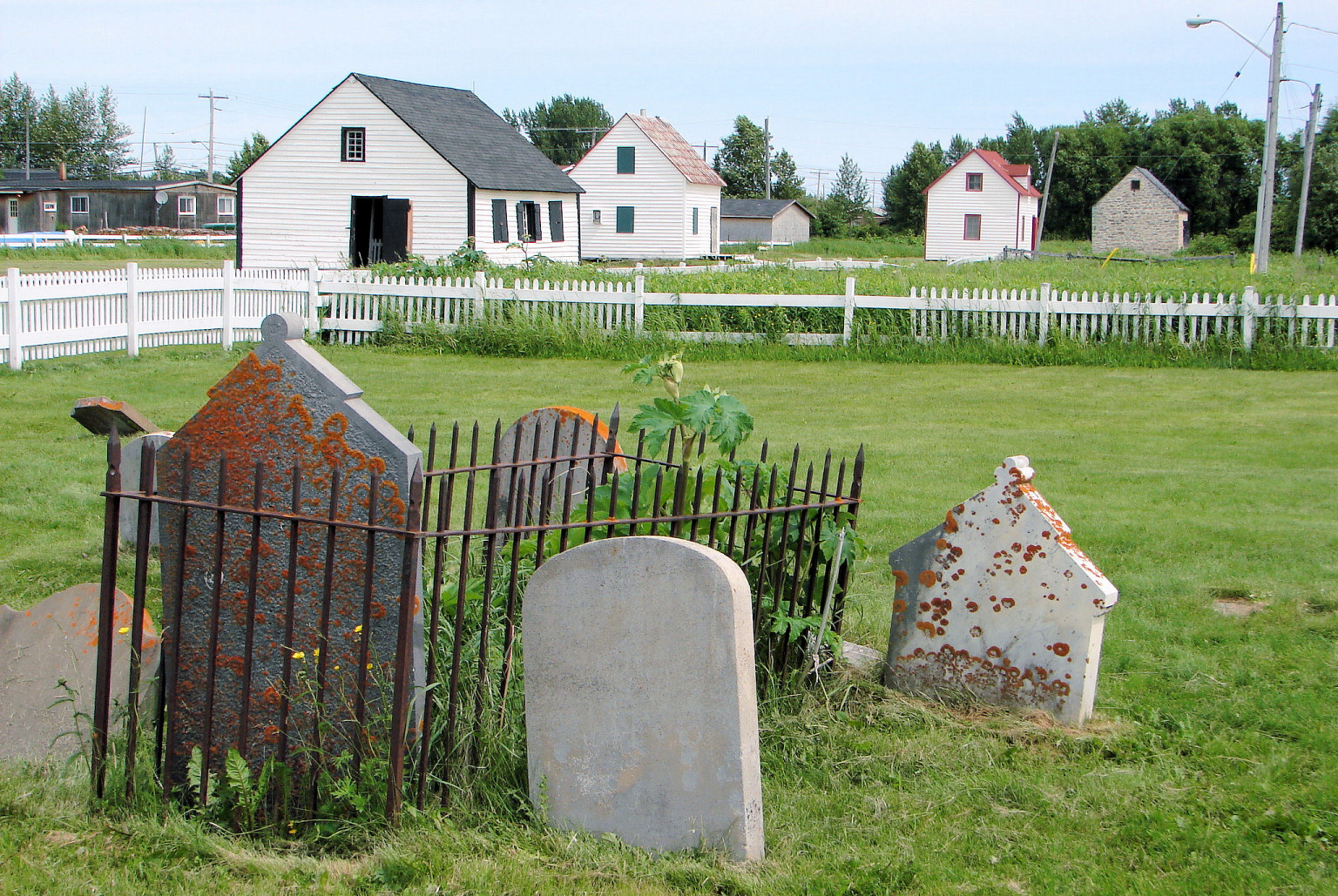
Centennial Park - foreground: historic cemetery; background (from left to right): blacksmith shop, McLeod House, Sackabuckiskum House, Powder magazine.

The Moose Factory Buildings National Historic Site of Canada "consisted of several buildings, of which only the Staff House is at its original location. Built in 1847-50, it is the last surviving fur trade officer’s dwelling in Canada and the oldest building in the James Bay area. The Powder Magazine, built in 1865-66, is situated some distance away on its original location, in what is now Centennial Park."

The 19th-century buildings associated with the Hudson's Bay Company post were designated a National Historic Site of Canada in 1957.

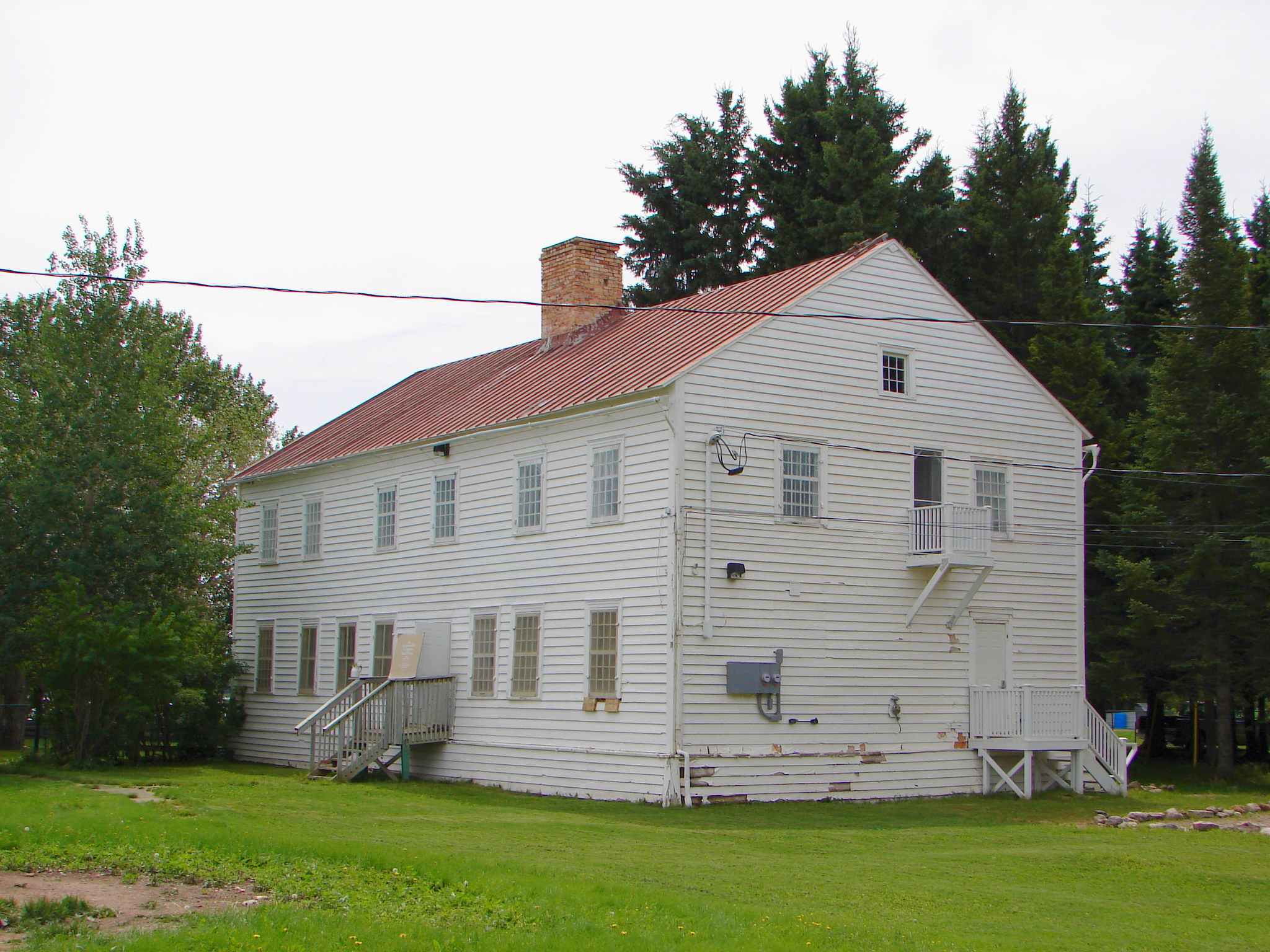
Hudson's Bay Company staff house

The Moose Factory Hudson's Bay Company staff house was originally the officers' dwelling for HBC doctors, captains, clerks, and secretaries; it is now used as a museum and tourism office. The staff house was built between 1847 and 1850, making it the oldest building in the James Bay area and the last surviving HBC officers' dwelling. Like several other buildings in this National Historic site, the Staff House is a historic listed building, recognized by the Ontario Heritage Trust.

In the Hudson's Bay Company cemetery the oldest tombstone is dated 1802 and marks the grave of the Cree wife and children of John Thomas who was the post's factor at that time. There are only a few graves of British men, since they would return home upon retirement or completion of their contract. In total, 51 graves stones can be found here.

Joseph Turner House is the oldest known surviving servant house of the HBC, built in 1863 and named for HBC trader Joseph Turner (1783-1865), son of an English surveyor and Ojibway wife.

William McLeod House was the carpenter's house built in 1889-90 by HBC carpenter William McLeod. The house, historically listed by the Province and by the federal government, once served as the home for the McLeod family.

Ham Sackabuckiskum House is the only surviving Cree summer home and one of the first balloon-frame construction house in Moose Factory, built in 1926 by the HBC as an incentive to ensure loyalty from Cree trappers. It is also a historically listed building. In the early days, the house was the residence of Sackabuckiskum, a "Cree fur-trapper and HBC affiliate".

The blacksmith shop is the last known surviving HBC blacksmith shop, built in 1849, and was used until 1934.

The powder magazine is the only stone structure, built in 1865, was part of the palisaded warehouse complex. In the early 20th century, it was converted from gunpowder to general storage.

=== St. Thomas' Anglican Church ===
St. Thomas' Anglican Church is a historic Carpenter Gothic style Anglican church built by the Hudson's Bay Company. Construction began in 1864 and was completed in 1885.

== Government ==
Moose Cree First Nation
- Band No. 144
- ᒨᓱᓂᔨ ᐃᓕᓕᐗᒃ, môsoniyi ililiwak
- People: Cree
- Treaty: 9

Land
- Main reserve: Factory Island 1
- Reserve: Moose Factory 68
- Land area: 173.93 km^{2} (67.15 sq mi)

Population (2026)
- On reserve: 1829
- On other land: 87
- Off reserve: 3343
- Total population: 5259

Government
- Chief: William Peter Wesley
- Council: Warren Wendell Allan Stanley Hardisty (Deputy Chief); Bob Michael Echum; Katherine Ann Faries-Quachegan; Gary Glen Innes; Howard Thomas Isaac; Isaiah Terrance Moore; Pauline Mary Rebecca Rickard; Elliot Walker Schimmens; Mary Schimmens; Katherine Ann Turner; Bert Saunders Wapachee; Nathan Isaiah Beck; Blain Aston Butterfly; James George Wesley; Barbara Louise Faries

Tribal Council
- Mushkegowuk Council

Website
- https://moosecree.com

Colloquially, Moose Factory is associated with the whole island, but the island is politically divided into two political entities:

- Factory Island 1 – Indian reserve of 3.08 square kilometres (1.19 sq mi) that make up the northern two-thirds of the island, governed by Moose Cree First Nation. The First Nation's government is led by an elected Chief, Deputy Chief, and Councillors.
- Moose Factory South – municipal designated place in the southern third of the island, part of Unorganized North Cochrane District. This section of the island is governed by the provincial Local Services Board and the provincial Weeneebayko Area Health Authority that administers the regional medical facility, Weeneebayko General Hospital.

Federally, Moose Factory is part of the Kapuskasing—Timmins—Mushkegowuk electoral district.

Provincially, Moose Factory is part of the Mushkegowuk—James Bay electoral district.

Moose Cree First Nation is part of the Mushkegowuk Tribal Council, a non-profit Regional Chiefs' Council representing eight Cree First Nations in northern Ontario, which has its headquarters in Moose Factory.

The First Nation also controls the 170.94-square-kilometre (66.00 sq mi) Moose Factory 68 reserve, located about 8 kilometres (5.0 mi) southwest of James Bay on the east banks of the Moose River.

== Infrastructure ==
=== Transportation ===
Gravel roads are used for vehicles within town.

The mainland, can be accessed by water taxi in the summer, ice road in the winter, and chartered helicopter in the off-season (break-up or freeze-up). A private company also offers freighter-canoe ferry service across the Moose River. As of 2020, the MV Niska 1 ferry was operating between Moosonee and Moose Factory, carrying passengers and vehicles.

=== Healthcare ===
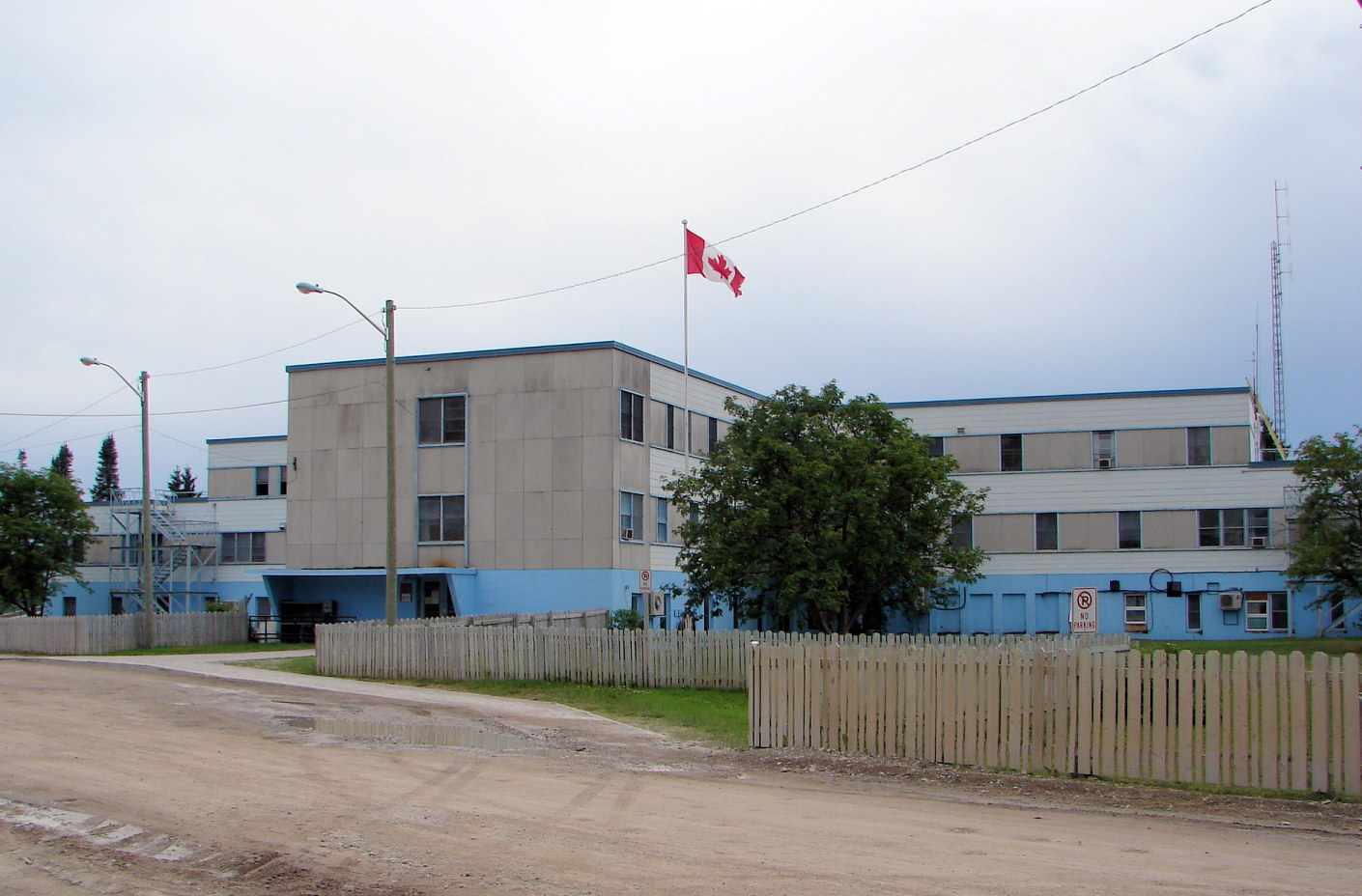
Weeneebayko General Hospital

In 1949 the Moose Factory General Hospital was built – a $3 million project – as a sanitarium for tuberculosis patients on Moose Factory Island "in order to isolate the disease" in response to a tuberculosis epidemic. It served both First Nations and Inuit patients.

Today the Weeneebayko General Hospital provides medical services as part of the Weeneebayko Area Health Authority to residents of Moose Factory, Moosonee as well as Fort Albany, Ontario, Attawapiskat First Nation, Kashechewan First Nation and Peawanuck First Nation. The medical staff (consisting of 12 family physicians, 1 anesthetist and 1 surgeon) work with their tertiary care facilities in Kingston, Toronto, Sudbury, and Timmins.

The hospital provides various specialized services:

- 24-hour emergency services
- family medicine clinics
- dentistry
- occupational and rehabilitative services
- general surgery and anesthesia
- dialysis
- traditional healing program (with counsellors and traditional healers)
- diabetes education services
- regularly scheduled specialities including: pediatrics, obstetrics/gynecology, geriatrics rheumatology, ophthalmology, rehabilitation and neurology
- diagnostic imaging (computed tomography, x-ray and ultrasound)
- laboratory services

Chartered aircraft "schedevacs" or "medivacs" are used to provide patients with transportation to diagnostic tests (e.g. CT and MRI) and specialize care. Queen's University is the primary university link with many medical students completing placements at the hospital. However, there are also associations with the University of Toronto, McMaster University, University of Ottawa, and the Northern Ontario School of Medicine.

== Education ==
Moose Factory has three schools:

- Ministik Public School is a public elementary school operated by the Moose Factory Island District School Area Board. The school opened in 1984 and has JK to Grade 8.
- Delores D. Echum Composite School is a senior elementary and secondary school operated by the Moose Cree Education Authority. The school opened in 1997 and has Grades 7 to 12.
- Moose Factory Academy of Christian Education is a private elementary school and opened in 1995.

Some post-secondary programs are provided by Northern College via distant learning (correspondence, video, and web-based courses) or Ontario Learn Courses (web-based). James Bay Education Centre Northern College-Education Complex is a liaison base for the community college.

In Moose Factory, Bishop Horden Memorial School also known as Horden Hall Residential School, Moose Factory Residential School, Moose Fort Indian Residential School (1907-1963), named after Bishop Horden, serving all the communities in the James Bay area, was run by the Anglican Church. The Truth and Reconciliation Commission investigated the school which, like others across Canada, where the highest number of premature deaths among children at these schools was from tuberculosis.

== Notable people ==
- Former NHL Ice hockey player Jonathan Cheechoo is a native of Moose Factory.
- Actress, writer, producer, director, and visual artist Shirley Cheechoo was raised in Moose Factory
- Sculptor Duane Linklater was born in Moose Factory

== See also ==
- William Bevan (sloopmaster) – chief factor and commander of Moose Fort in 1732.
- List of unincorporated communities in Ontario
