= St. Thomas' Anglican Church (Moose Factory, Ontario) =

Historic church in Ontario, Canada

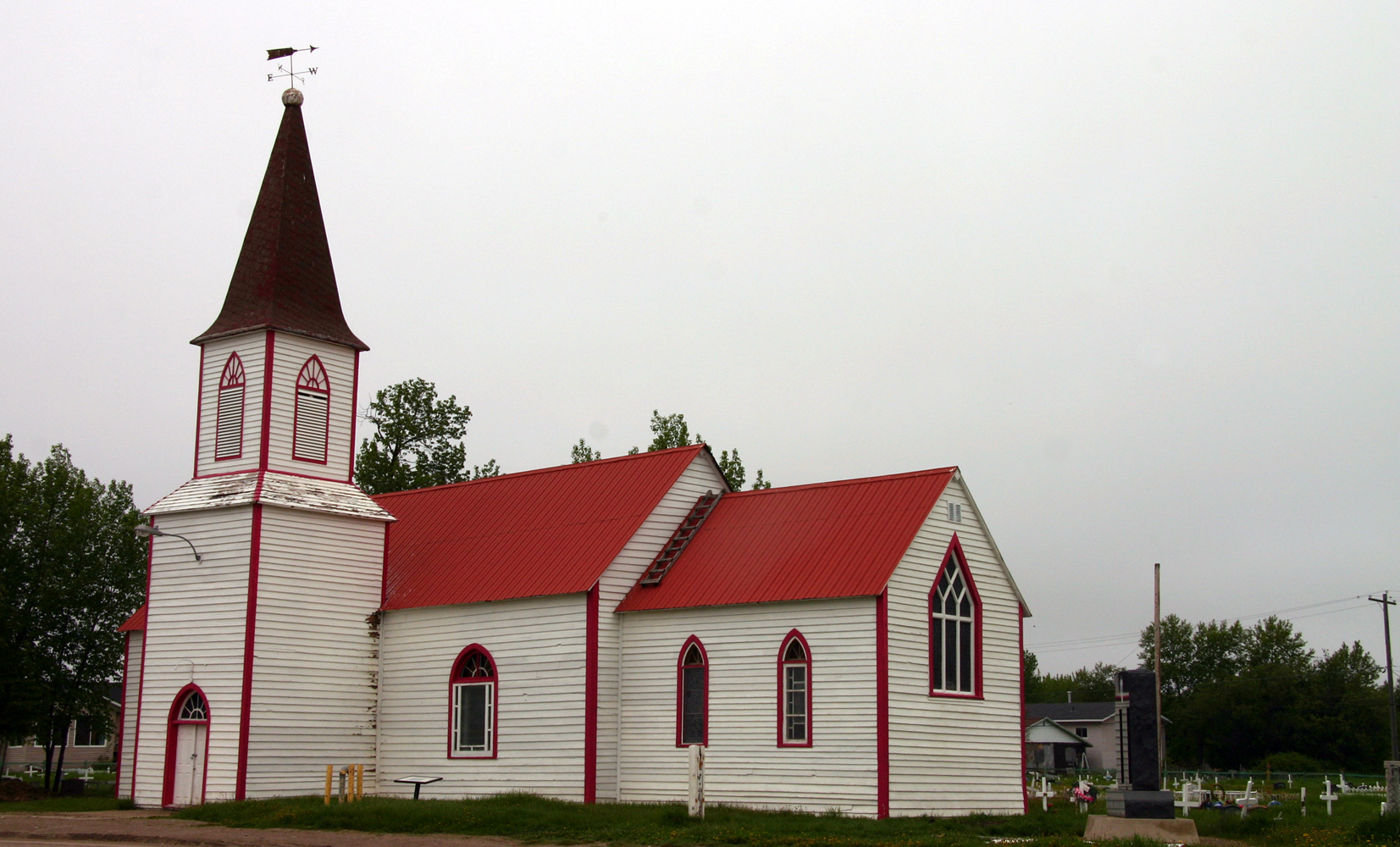
- St. Thomas' Anglican Church in June 2008
- Interactive map of the St. Thomas' Anglican Church area

General information
- Architectural style: Carpenter Gothic
- Location: Moose Factory, Ontario, Canada
- Coordinates: 51.250889°N 80.608306°W
- Construction started: 1864
- Completed: 1885

Technical details
- Structural system: Post and beam, wood frame

Design and construction
- Main contractor: Hudson's Bay Company

St. Thomas' Anglican Church is an historic Carpenter Gothic style Anglican church edifice built by the Hudson's Bay Company in Moose Factory, Ontario, Canada.

== History ==
Construction began in 1864 but was not completed until 1885. St. Thomas' origins date to the late 1840s when officials of the Hudson's Bay Company requested the bishop of the Anglican Diocese of Rupert's Land to send someone to continue the missionary work of the Rev. George Barnley, a Wesleyan minister who had been in Moose Factory from 1840 to 1848. The bishop sent an English schoolteacher, John Horden, who arrived on August 26, 1851, with his bride. Horden set about learning the local Cree language and translating portions of the Bible, the Book of Common Prayer and hymns into it. He also started a school and started holding services for what would become St. Thomas' Church.

Horden was ordained to the priesthood while serving in Moose Factory and in 1872 became the first bishop of the Anglican Diocese of Moosonee whose see was then in Moose Factory.

== Current use ==
St. Thomas' Anglican Church is still an active parish in the Anglican Diocese of Moosonee predominantly made up of Cree elders. Services are conducted in the Cree language and in English. Since October 2006, the historic church has not been used for services and needs significant repairs. The congregation uses another building that was formerly a Catholic church. The Rev. John B. Edmonds retired as priest in August 2008.

In 2023, in conjunction with Moose Fort's 350th anniversary, the Moose River Heritage and Hospitality Association announced plans to restore St. Thomas' Church as a multipurpose community centre that can host church services as well as other civic and community events. The association is hosting "reconciliation" talks among community members to address the legacy of St. Thomas' former residential school and the future use of the space. The budget for the restoration is $2 million (Canadian), of which the association is seeking $1.5 million in government grants and $500,000 in private donations.
