= Moose Cree =

Division of the Cree Nation

ililîw "human being"
- Person: ililîw ᐃᓕᓕᐤ
- People: ililîwak ᐃᓕᓕᐗᒃ
- Language: ililîmowin ᐃᓕᓖᒧᐎᓐ; Hand Talk
- Country: ililîwaskiy ᐃᓕᓕᐗᔅᑭᔾ

The Moose Cree people (Cree: Mōsonī or Ililiw) are also known as Moosonee (Monsoni), and together with the Eastern Swampy Cree also known as Central Cree, West James Bay Cree or West Main Cree. They speak the l-dialect of the Cree language.

The Moose Cree were first noted in Jesuit Relations for 1671, along the shores of James Bay and along the Moose River. On the Ochagach map (c. 1728), they (as "Monsonnis") were noted as far inland as the Rainy Lake region.

== First Nations ==
- Abitibi River Cree (historical)
  - Abitibiwinni First Nation (also Algonquin and Ojibwe)
  - Wahgoshig First Nation (also Algonquin and Ojibwe)
- Moose River Cree (historical)
  - Brunswick House First Nation (also Ojibwe)
  - Chapleau Cree First Nation
  - Constance Lake First Nation (also Ojibwe)
  - Kashechewan First Nation (also Swampy Cree)
  - Matachewan First Nation (also Ojibwe)
  - Missanabie Cree First Nation (also Ojibwe)
  - Moose Cree First Nation
  - Taykwa Tagamou Nation
- Lake Nipigon Cree (historical)
- Piscotagami River Cree (historical)
- Rainy Lake Cree (historical)
