= William Bevan (sloopmaster) =

Canadian explorer

William Bevan (fl. 1723–37) was an employee of the Hudson's Bay Company and came to the Fort Albany on James Bay in 1723 from England as mate of the Beaver sloop. He became Master there four years later, succeeding George Gunn in the third-highest-ranking position at the trading post.

Bevan and a party explored the Moose River area and the site of the older Moose Fort trading post which Pierre de Troyes had captured from the HBC in 1686, which the English had burned to the ground in 1696. A new Moose Fort was built in 1730 and Bevan became Chief Factor and Commander there in 1732. A careless kitchen fire caused the fort to burn to the ground on December 26, 1735, resulting in the death of an Indigenous girl in the fire, and the death of three HBC men afterwards from exposure and hunger. Despite his contract with the HBC being renewed in 1736, Beven was recalled to England in 1737, once news of the fire reached London. He was succeeded as Chief Factor of Moose District by Richard Staunton.
