= Moose Cree language =

Cree dialect of Ontario, Canada

Moose Cree
- ᐃᓕᓖᒧᐎᓐ Ililîmowin
- Native to: Canada
- Region: Ontario
- Ethnicity: 5,000 Moose Cree (1982)
- Native speakers: 3,000 (2007)
- Language family: Algic: Algonquian; Cree-Montagnais-Naskapi; Cree; Moose Cree

Language codes
- ISO 639-3: crm
- Glottolog: moos1236
- Linguasphere: 62-ADA-ae
- Moose Cree is classified as Vulnerable by the UNESCO Atlas of the World's Languages in Danger.

ililîw "human being"
- Person: ililîw ᐃᓕᓕᐤ
- People: ililîwak ᐃᓕᓕᐗᒃ
- Language: ililîmowin ᐃᓕᓖᒧᐎᓐ; Hand Talk
- Country: ililîwaskiy ᐃᓕᓕᐗᔅᑭᔾ

Moose Cree is a dialect of the Cree language spoken mainly in Moose Factory, Ontario.

== Classification ==
As a dialect of the Cree language, Moose Cree is classified under the Algonquian branch of the Algic language family.

== Name ==
The term Moose Cree is derived either from the toponym Môsoniy, meaning 'Moose Island' or Môso-sîpiy, meaning 'Moose River'. The former is the historical name for the summering grounds of the speakers of this dialect, but has been appropriated by the modern municipality of Moosonee, leaving the island with the official English name of Moose Factory, a name that recalls the historical presence of a Hudson's Bay trading post, originally called 'factories'. The above-mentioned hydronym refers to the river where the said island is located. Speakers of the dialect refer to the language as Ililîmowin.

== Official status ==
In Ontario, the Cree language has no official status.

== Phonology ==
- Preservation of the Proto-Algonquian *k as /k/
- Preservation of the Proto-Algonquian *r as a distinctive consonant /l/
- Preservation of historical distinction between /s/ and /ʃ/ outside of consonant clusters
- Assimilation of /n/ to [l] in presence of another intramorphemic /l/
- Preservation of the phonological status of all eight Proto-Algonquian vowels, except for Proto-Algonquian *e on occasion. For this phoneme, an incomplete change is apparent whereby in certain words and morphemes it has shifted to /i/, resulting in predictable morphophonological adjustments in the modern dialect.

Proto-Algonquian vowel	Moose Cree phoneme	Moose Cree phone & allophones	Moose Cree orthography
*e	/e/, /i/	[ɪ], [i]	⟨i⟩
*e:	/eː/	[ɛː], [eː], [i], [oː]	⟨e⟩
*i	/i/	[ɪ], [i]	⟨i⟩
*i:	/iː/	[iː]	⟨î⟩
*a	/a/	[ə], [a]	⟨a⟩
*a:	/aː/	[aː], [ɔː]	⟨â⟩
*o	/u/	[ʊ], [u]	⟨o⟩
*o:	/uː/	[uː]	⟨ô⟩

== Orthography ==
Moose Cree is traditionally written in the Eastern Syllabics, a variant of syllabics used by Cree dialects spoken in communities where the Anglican church once had a strong presence, namely Fort Albany and Moose Factory in Ontario, as well as the Cree communities in Quebec. The Latin alphabet is also in use locally, as a phonetic and non-standard script in hymnals and various locally produced materials and as a standardized script in pedagogical materials. The latter use is based on standardization efforts for the Cree language at large.
