= Dundas District Public School =

Location
- 397 King Street West; Dundas, Ontario, L9H 1W1; Canada
- Coordinates: 43.27246°N 79.97131°W

Information
- School type: Middle School (closed)
- Founded: 1923
- Closed: November 5, 2007
- School board: Hamilton-Wentworth District School Board
- Grades: 6-8
- Language: English & French Immersion
- Colours: Blue & White
- Mascot: District Bears
- Last updated: June 3, 2007

Dundas District Public School was a middle school, that was originally a high school, built in 1928 located in Dundas, now part of the City of Hamilton, Ontario. It was part of the Hamilton-Wentworth District School Board. It is currently a condominium called District Lofts.

== Location ==
Dundas District Public School is located on the former Highway 8, at the foot of the Niagara Escarpment that provided a scenic location and was also easily accessible for students in Dundas, and in the Flamborough area. The former Dundas District High School is a landmark in Dundas, located on the western edge of the town, just below the Niagara Escarpment. The property includes the remains of the original Fisher mill. Directly across the street, on the south side of King Street, a playing field, also owned by the School Board, adds to the context and is marked by a significant Chinquapin oak tree, an exceptionally rare species, with the specimen estimated to be at least 200 years old and listed on the Ontario Honour Roll of Trees.

== Architecture ==
The Dundas District High School was built to the designs of the noted Hamilton architect William J. Walsh in the Collegiate Gothic style. Although the completed building was not as grand as the architect had originally envisioned (due to budget restrictions), it is nevertheless a well-proportioned and substantial three-storey building clad in rug brick with fine carved-stone detailing. The stone Gothic ornamentation includes pinnacles, gargoyles, decorative crests and door lintels that mark the entrance for girls on one side and boys on the other. Stylistically, the building is comparable to other Hamilton schools of the same era and style – such as George R. Allen and Westdale High School. There have been a number of additions (1948, 1953, 1956, 1968), yet the building retains a high degree of architectural integrity, especially with respect to its most significant front façade on King Street.

== History ==
The history of the former Dundas District High School dates back to 1849 when the Dundas Select Academy was established as a private grammar school on Ogilvie Street. The existing building at 397 King Street West was constructed in 1928 on the former mill property donated by Robert and Frank Fisher—the Fisher brothers agreed to donate their property containing the Fisher Paper Mill (Gore Mills), plus the vacant lot on the opposite side of King Street, with a stipulation placed on the deed that the property must be kept in perpetuity for educational and public playground use.

With an increase in population in the area, it was supplemented by two new high schools, Highland and Parkside.

Although it was the smallest of the three schools, District continued to operate as a high school until its closure in 1982.

Dundas District became the temporary home of the students of Dundas Central Public between 1987 and 1989 when Central was closed due to safety concerns.

Dundas District was closed on November 5, 2007, in preparation for the students to transfer to the newly built Sir William Osler Elementary School.

=== Becoming a Historical Site ===
In August 2007, the site was considered to be deemed a historic site and be preserved.

In 2009 the Valvasori brothers bought the school and began the process of converting the building to condominiums.

== Notable alumni ==
Notable alumni include actor Dave Thomas and his musician brother Ian Thomas.
