= Vienneau =

Vienneau is a surname. Notable people with the surname include:

- David Vienneau (1951–2004), Canadian journalist
- Jim Vienneau (1926–2023), American music producer
- Jocelyne Roy-Vienneau (1956–2019), Lieutenant Governor of New Brunswick, Canada
