= Virtual Doorman =

- Type: Private
- Industry: Security technology, property technology (PropTech)
- Founded: 1997
- Founder: Virtual Service (parent company)
- Key people: Colin Foster
- Products: Remote doorman systems, video intercom, access control, monitoring services
- Website: virtualdoorman.com

Virtual Doorman is an American company that provides remote security and virtualconcierge services for residential and commercial buildings. It was the first company to introduce a remote doorman system in New York City, offering services such as video-based access control, visitor screening, and package management. The company is headquartered in New York City and operates primarily in the United States.

Virtual Doorman is a registered trademark of Future Communications Corporation of New York, doing business as Virtual Service.

== History ==
Virtual Doorman was founded in 1997 as a division of Virtual Service, a security and monitoring company based in New York. Its services expanded in the late 2000s, alongside broader adoption of remote concierge and security technology in residential real estate.

The company launched its first remote doorman system in 2000 and expanded its deployment in New York City residential buildings. By 2009, the service was reported to be used in more than 100 apartment complexes in the New York metropolitan area. The technology was initially deployed in residential developments in Manhattan and provided an alternative to traditional doorman staffing.

By 2009, Virtual Doorman had developed a third-generation system and begun expanding through an authorized dealer network. The system integrated video entry, access control and remote operator services, and was designed for use with existing building-entry equipment. In 2015, the service was reported to be used by more than 200 properties across New York City. The company also introduced a smartphone application that allowed residents to remotely grant visitors and guests access, receive packages and deliveries, and view visitor logs. The app was also planned for availability at properties in San Francisco and Philadelphia.

== Operations ==
Virtual Doorman’s systems use video intercoms, access control hardware, and remote monitoring centers. Personnel at these centers communicate with visitors and manage building access from off-site locations. The company also provides software and mobile applications for managing visitor and delivery access.

The early system combined video monitoring, intercom communication, and remote-controlled door locks to allow off-site personnel to perform security and concierge functions. Virtual Doorman operates remote monitoring centers in locations including Jacksonville, Florida, and Unity, Maine.

In 2026, Virtual Doorman's platform combined access-control infrastructure, video intercoms, centralized software, and remote operators for multifamily, condominium, and mixed-use residential properties. Colin Foster is the founder and chief innovation officer of Virtual Service and creator of Virtual Doorman. Virtual doorman systems have also been used in smaller condominium developments as an alternative to full-time doorman staffing. In such systems, a remote operator can monitor the building entrance, communicate with visitors, and contact residents to determine whether visitors should be admitted.

In 2023, the New York Supreme Court, Appellate Division, First Department, considered a condominium in which a physical doorman was present during daytime hours and a virtual doorman provided coverage during the remaining hours. The court noted that the arrangement was disclosed in the condominium's offering plan.
