= Graeme MacKay =

Canadian editorial cartoonist

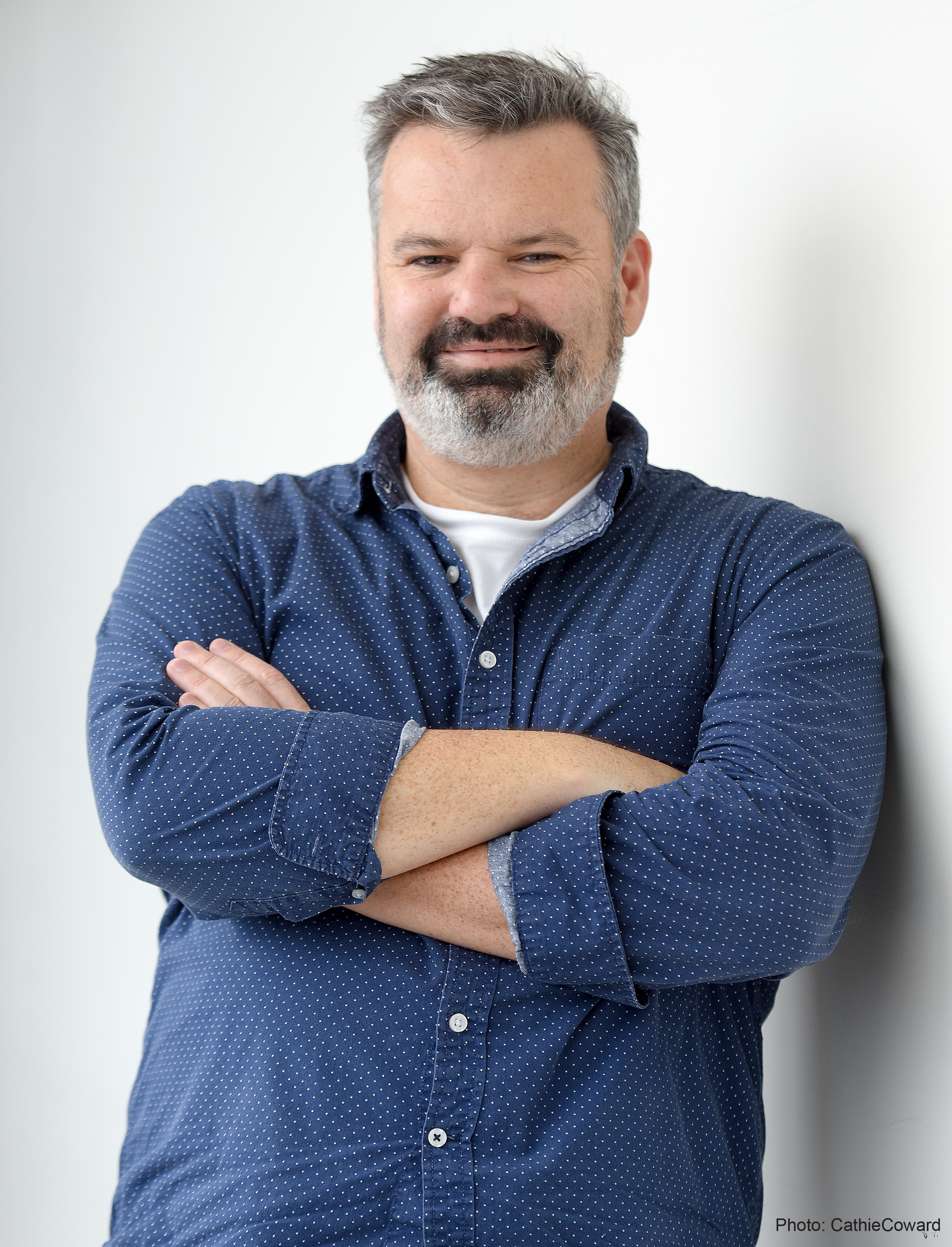
- Born: Graeme Patrick MacKay; September 23, 1968 (age 58) Dundas, Ontario, Canada
- Area: Cartoonist

Graeme Patrick MacKay (born 23 September 1968) is a Canadian editorial cartoonist for The Hamilton Spectator, where he has worked full-time since 1997, making various political cartoons for the newspaper.

== Early life and career ==
MacKay was born in Dundas, Ontario. After graduating from Parkside High School, he attended the University of Ottawa, where he studied history and political science. He contributed cartoons to the student newspaper The Fulcrum and was elected its graphics editor. From 1989 to 1991 he illustrated "Alas & Alack", a weekly comic strip co-written with Paul Nichols that satirized public figures in a medieval setting.

After spending two years working in Europe and North Africa, MacKay began publishing freelance illustrations in newspapers and magazines, including the Toronto Star, the Ottawa Citizen, the Chicago Tribune, the Canadian Forum, and Policy Options, published by the Institute for Research on Public Policy. From 1995 to 1997 he published local editorial cartoons in the Ancaster News and other Brabant newspapers (now owned by Metroland Media Group) under the pseudonym "Ham".

MacKay was hired as a full-time editorial cartoonist at The Hamilton Spectator in 1997. From 1999 to 2003 he illustrated Gridlock, a comic strip written by Spectator columnist Wade Hemsworth about five workers at a fictitious taxi company, Hammercab.

MacKay was president of the Association of Canadian Editorial Cartoonists from 2008 to 2010 and hosted its biennial gathering in Hamilton in September 2010. He lives in Hamilton.

== Awards ==
- Duncan Macpherson Award, second place, 1996
- United Nations/Ranan Lurie Political Cartoon Awards, Citation for Excellence, 2006 and 2013
- George Townsend Award: finalist (English language category), 2014; winner, 2018 and 2020
- National Newspaper Award finalist, 2020 and 2021

== Reception and controversy ==
Several of MacKay's cartoons have drawn public criticism.

A cartoon published on 22 August 2017 showed a person in a Nazi uniform holding a tiki torch being beaten by four people carrying peace-themed signs. The Hamilton LGBTQ media outlet BentQ published a response arguing that the cartoon resembled neo-Nazi propaganda, regardless of intent. After criticism on his Facebook page, MacKay took the cartoon down.

A cartoon published on 22 March 2018 depicted a Service Canada clerk asking a client how they wished to be addressed, referring to a recent directive encouraging employees to use gender-neutral language. Critics described the cartoon as transphobic.

A cartoon published on 24 August 2018 portrayed Ontario Premier Doug Ford in response to the Progressive Conservative government's repeal of the 2015 sex education curriculum and its plan to take reports of teachers not following the earlier curriculum. It drew criticism and letters to the editor. Spectator editor-in-chief Paul Berton defended the cartoon in a column.

A cartoon published on 20 August 2021 compared the Taliban with the Conservative Party of Canada during the 2021 Canadian federal election campaign. Some readers complained to the Spectator that it was unfair and biased, while others said such a reaction was to be expected of satire.

== Exhibitions ==
- "Bye Bye Jean", La Galerie Rouge, Quebec City, 2003
- "Halifax Pub Scrawl", Economy Shoe Shop, Halifax, 2005
- "Bush Leaguers: Cartoonists Take on the White House", Katzen Center, American University, Washington, D.C., 2007; later shown in Pittsburgh and Columbus, Ohio
- "Doodles to Digital: Editorial Cartooning in the 21st Century", Art Gallery of Hamilton, 2010
- "Polar Lines", National Arts Centre, Ottawa, 2011
- "World Press Cartoon 2012", Sintra, Portugal, 2012
- "Cartoonist Amigos", Havana, Cuba, 2014
- "The Auld Acquaintance", a travelling exhibit on Scottish independence, 2014
- "This is Serious: Canadian Indie Comics", Art Gallery of Hamilton, 2019–2020

== Publications ==
- You Might Be From Hamilton If..., MacIntyre Purcell Publishing, 2017
- Mennonite Cobbler: Balancing Faith and Tradition in a Turbulent World (illustrations), AuthorHouse, 2016
- Best Editorial Cartoons of the Year, Pelican Publishing Company (2002, 2006, 2007, 2010, 2012)
- Portfoolio: The Year's Best Canadian Editorial Cartoons, editions 16–25 (2000–2013), McClelland & Stewart
