= Sweett =

Travel Tech Startup Company

- Type: Limited liability company
- Industry: Travel
- Founded: 2014
- Founder: Paul Besnainou
- Headquarters: Tel Aviv, Israel
- Area served: Paris, Bruxelles, Barcelone, Lisbonne, Rome, Jerusalem, Tel Aviv, London, Madrid, Milan, Dublin, Sevilla
- Key people: Paul Besnainou (CEO)
- Products: Lodging
- Number of employees: 180
- Website: https://www.sweett.com

Sweett (formerly Sweet Inn) is a French-Israeli travel tech scale-up company founded in 2014. Active in Europe and in Israel, the company offers upscale vacation apartments with hotel services for tourists and business travelers.

As of 2019, Sweett has around 180 employees, and the housing stock includes upwards of 800 apartments.

== Description ==
In 2014, Paul Besnainou decided to launch Sweet Inn as a new kind of hospitality brand, one which would rent, manage and sublease apartments combined with an experience "worthy of a 5-star hotel."

Sweett designs and refurbishes its own apartments, focusing on "the importance of the design, the central locations in the cities’ typical buildings...". All apartments offer expensive concierge services.

== History ==
Sweett's first rental apartments were situated in Paris, Jerusalem and Tel-Aviv (2014), followed by Brussels, Barcelona, Lisbon and Rome in 2015. Madrid and Milan furthered the company's expansion in 2017, followed by London, Dublin, Seville in 2018. The company aims to expand to other leading European cities and Asia in 2019.

Though initially aimed at tourists, Sweett has been attracting more and more business travelers too and has created dedicated services aimed at them.

== Business model ==
Sweett operates in the short-term housing rental market, dominated by the peer-to-peer platforms, but has a different business model.

Since its launch, the company has consistently grown 100% annually.
