= Doorman (profession) =

Door monitor at a luxury residential building or hotel

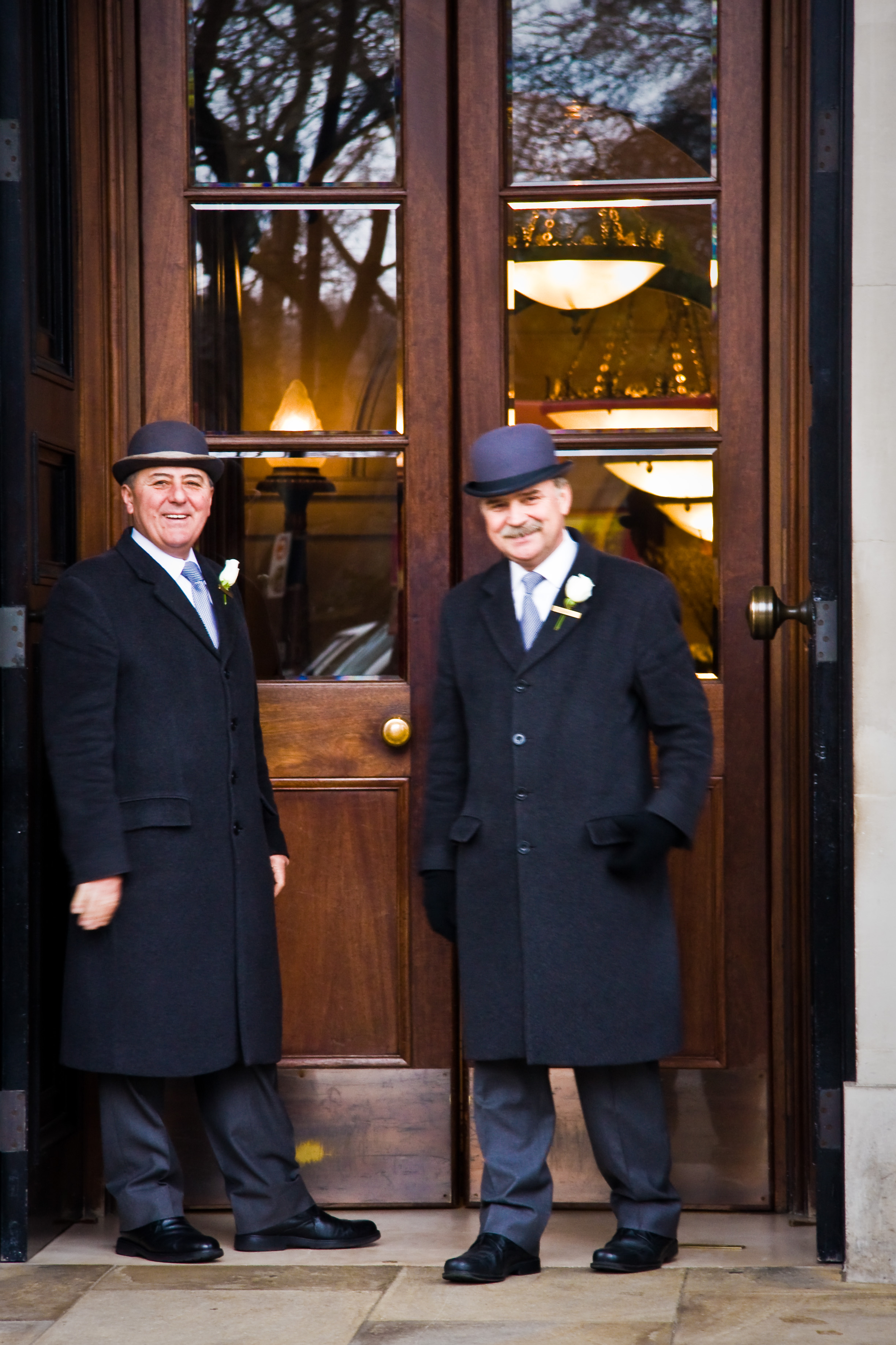
Hotel doormen in London

A doorman (or doorwoman/doorperson), also called a porter in British English, is a person hired to provide courtesy and security services at a residential building or hotel. They are common in urban luxury highrises. At a residential building, a doorperson is responsible for opening doors and screening visitors and deliveries. They will often provide other courtesy services such as signing for packages, carrying luggage between the elevator and the street, or hailing taxis for residents and guests.

== History ==
The occupation dates back at least to the time of Plautus under the Roman Republic where its name was iānitor (from iānua, 'door', the root of "janitor").

== Modern era ==
The United States House of Representatives had an official doorkeeper until the post was abolished in 1995.

In New York City, doorpeople and elevator operators are unionized and typically represented by SEIU 32BJ. They last went on strike in 1991, and other strikes were narrowly averted in 2006, 2010, and 2022. New York City doorpeople tend to be immigrant men. Historically they were Irish; in more recent times they are often Hispanic, Central European or Eastern European (Polish, Albanian, Montenegrin, and Macedonian). In 1997, Sheila Connors became the first female doorperson at the Plaza Hotel in New York City.

In Egypt, doormen are called bawab, and in modern times, they have been described by the BBC as security guards, porters, enforcers of social mores and general snoops, all rolled into one.

== See also ==
- Bouncer (doorman)
- Bawab
- Concierge
- Ostiarius
- Porter (monastery)
- Receptionist
