= Bawab =

Kind of doorman common in Cairo, Egypt

A bawab (Arabic: بواب) is a kind of doorman common in Cairo, Egypt. A bawab's job is to watch the entrance of the house or building where they work and perform errands and tasks for residents, essentially combining the function of a doorman with that of a building superintendent and errand boy. The bawab has been described by the BBC as a security guard, porter, enforcer of social mores and general snoop, all rolled into one.

Most buildings have more than one bawab who work in shifts. Bawabs are usually male and wear a gallabeya, a native Egyptian dress. Traditionally, bawabs were from Upper Egypt due to the widespread poverty there. Many modern bawabs are local ex-military men, and some buildings have transitioned to using private security companies which provide uniformed guards.

A bawab's salary is determined and paid by residents of the house or the residential building.
