= Olivia Ferney =

Canadian travel agent and influencer

- Born: 2000 or 2001 (age 25–26); Dundas, Ontario
- Occupations: Social media influencer, travel agent

Olivia Ferney is a Canadian social media influencer and travel agent. She is best known for her content focused on her role as a high-end concierge for wealthy individuals. She was named to the Time100 Creators in 2026.

== Biography ==
Ferney was born and raised in Dundas, Ontario as the child of schoolteachers. She grew up in a log cabin. She attended the University of Western Ontario, before moving to Miami. There, she was hired to a company called Top Tier Travels, a luxury concierge service, which is run by a man who has since become her fiancee. She has since become its Chief Marketing Officer. She has stated that this has made her largely live out of hotels.

She started creating social media content detailing her work for her clients in 2025. She has stated that all of the content she creates is real and with the permission of her clients, though some of the content is created through reenactment. Her content was described as "addictive viewing" by the New York Times.

She has emphasized the importance of flying out to major travel destinations to retain relationships with relevant individuals and aid her work. She takes most of her calls poolside, which, according to the New York Times, permits her to use "therapeutic neutrality in the face of outlandish behavior." She has been called "the living embodiment of the axiom 'The Customer is Always Right'".

Some of the most notable acts that she has been called on to do include acquiring Paris's largest croissant and taking it to Miami, shipping spring water to the Caribbean, and re-sourcing lemons that weren't vegan enough. However, she was unable to rent out a full branch of the Palm Jumeirah.

She has been called on to predict luxury travel destinations. She was named to the Time 100 Creators in 2026. In February 2026, Fifth Season announced they would be producing a series based on her social media content. As of 2026, she had more than 2 million followers.
