= Winter Equinox =

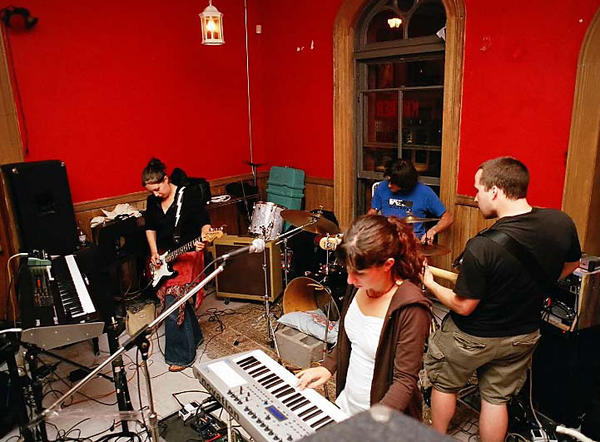

Background information
- Origin: Dundas/Waterloo, Canada
- Genres: Post-rock; Experimental music Electronica; Indie rock
- Years active: May 2004–March 2006
- Labels: Crony Records
- Members: Dan Roberts; Brad Weber; Lauren Yakiwchuk; Robyn Yakiwchuk
- Website: www.myspace.com/winterequinox

Winter Equinox were a post-rock/experimental band hailing from Dundas & Waterloo, Ontario, Canada, formed in May 2004.

The band was a mainly instrumental quartet that created music with elements of post-rock, electronic, glitch, and experimental sounds. The band placed an emphasis on heavily layered arrangements to create intense soundscapes, combined with occasional lyrical melodies and catchy bass grooves. Members of the band were classically trained and influenced by jazz and rock music.

Winter Equinox utilized a wide variety of instruments such as keyboards, bass, guitar, drums, percussion, flute, clarinet, melodica, and programmed rhythms to define their sound. The band took influences from artists such as Tortoise, Do Make Say Think, Mogwai, Caribou, Sigur Rós, Explosions in the Sky, The Notwist, M83, and Boards of Canada.

The band played many shows around the southern Ontario area. While playing live, they often employed a backdrop with self-produced videos playing behind them that synced up to the music. Notably, the band was invited to perform at Wavelength Magazine's Music Series while being featured within their monthly issue. They have also played alongside such acts as Caribou, The Organ, Matt Pond PA, and Holy Fuck. In the summer of 2005, Winter Equinox self-recorded and produced their debut album, Safe and Sound, released on Crony Records in August 2005. It was described Stylus Magazine's Theon Weber as " one of the great unnoticed albums of 2005." Following the release of their CD, the band toured out to Quebec and Eastern Canada as well as around Ontario.

Winter Equinox broke up in March 2006. The band's last show was on December 11, 2005, at The Casbah in Hamilton, Ontario, performing with Caribou and Holy Fuck. Weber currently creates solo music under the name Solitary Extraction. Lauren Yakiwchuk is currently in the duo Knife-Like Objects.

Winter Equinox had their song "Two Eyes" featured in the Canadian drama series, Whistler, in the fall of 2007. It was episode 4 of season 2 of the show.

== Discography ==
- Safe and Sound - August 2005
- Demo 02 EP - January 2005
- Demo 01 EP - August 2004
