= Dundas Central Public School =

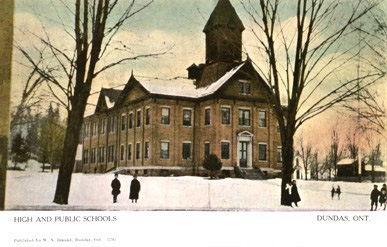

Location
- 73 Melville Street; Dundas, Ontario, L9H 2A2; Canada
- Coordinates: 43.2697°N 79.9581°W

Information
- School type: Primary School
- Founded: 1857
- School board: Hamilton-Wentworth District School Board
- Principal: Mr. Brennan B. Clark
- Grades: JK-8
- Enrollment: 550
- Language: English
- Colours: Green & Yellow
- Mascot: Cougar
- Website: www.hwdsb.on.ca/dundascentral/
- Last updated: June 3, 2007

Dundas Central Public School is a primary school located in Dundas, Ontario. It teaches students kindergarten to grade 8. Dundas Central is the second oldest school in Ontario. Dundas Central celebrated its 150th anniversary on June 16, 2007.

== Renovations in 1987 ==
In June 1987 it was closed for renovations and its students were relocated to the previously closed Dundas District. The school was originally renovated as a K-8 school which left intact the art room, shop, and family studies rooms.

== Changes After Construction ==
After relocating to the upgraded school in 1989, the seventh and eighth grade students were then moved back to the District which then became a middle school for students in grades 6 - 8. The following September Dundas Central began renting some of its empty classrooms to the Brock University Teachers College.

== Gymnasium ==
The Gymnasium for Central Public has a seating capacity of over 600.

== Awards ==
Ken Spencer Award for Innovation: Dundas Central teacher Heidi Siwak received the 2011/2012 Ken Spencer award for innovation for her guidance of grade 6 and 7 students on a project that peered students with programmers in Australia and Finland as well as digital media artists from New York to build a Tourism app for the iPhone.
