= King Street, Dundas, Ontario =

Road in Dundas, Ontario, Canada

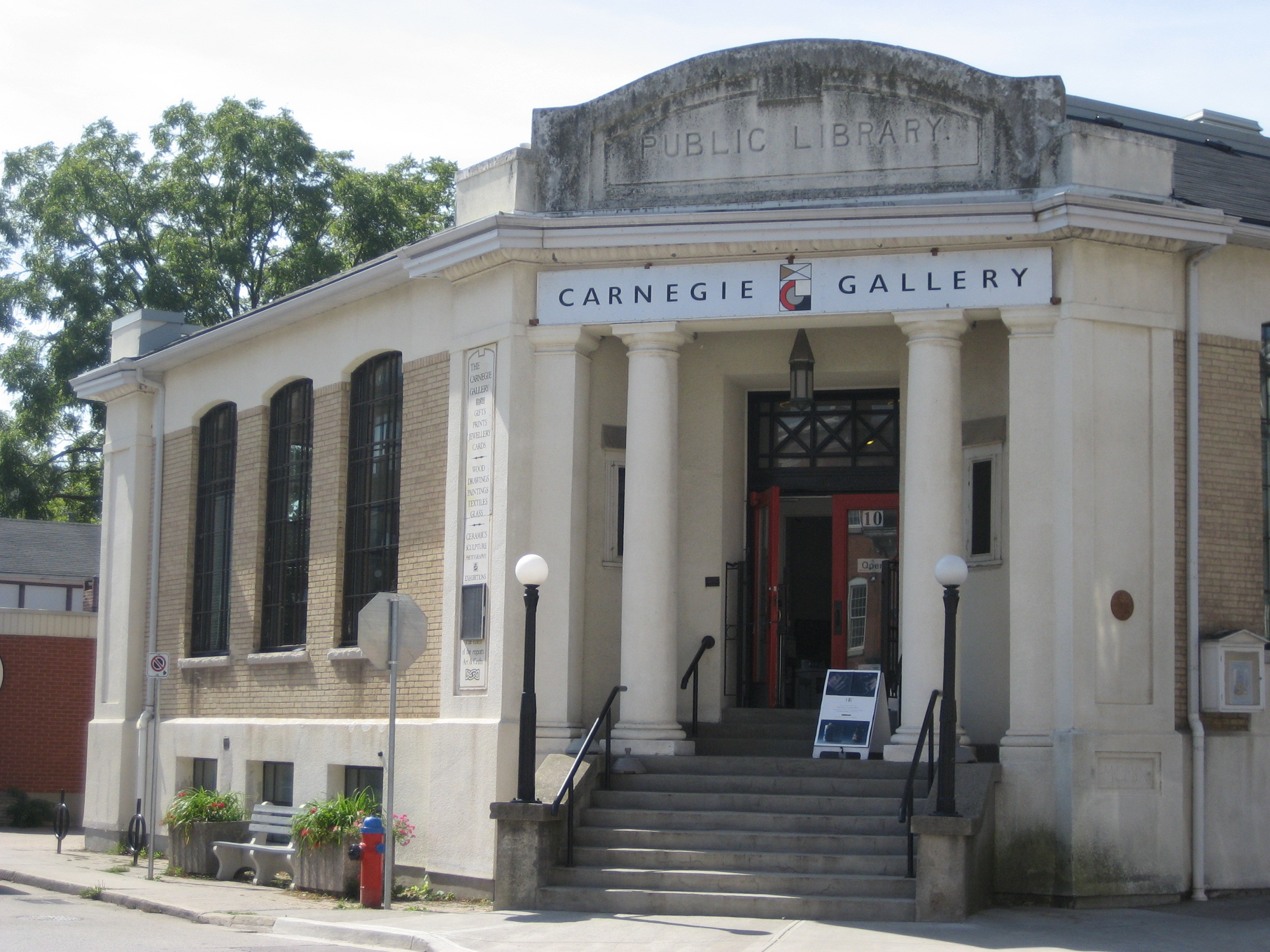
Carnegie Gallery

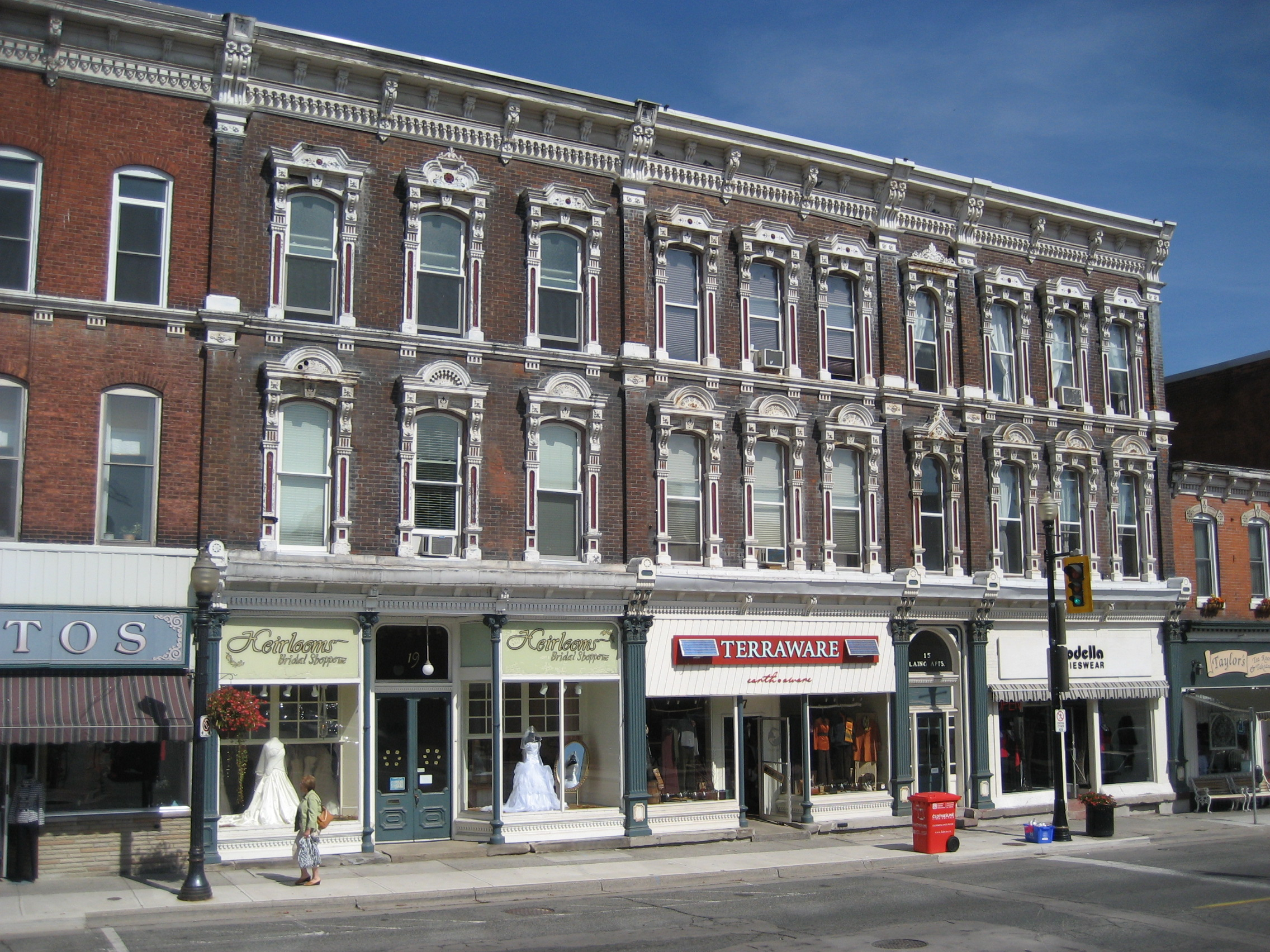
King Street West, Dundas

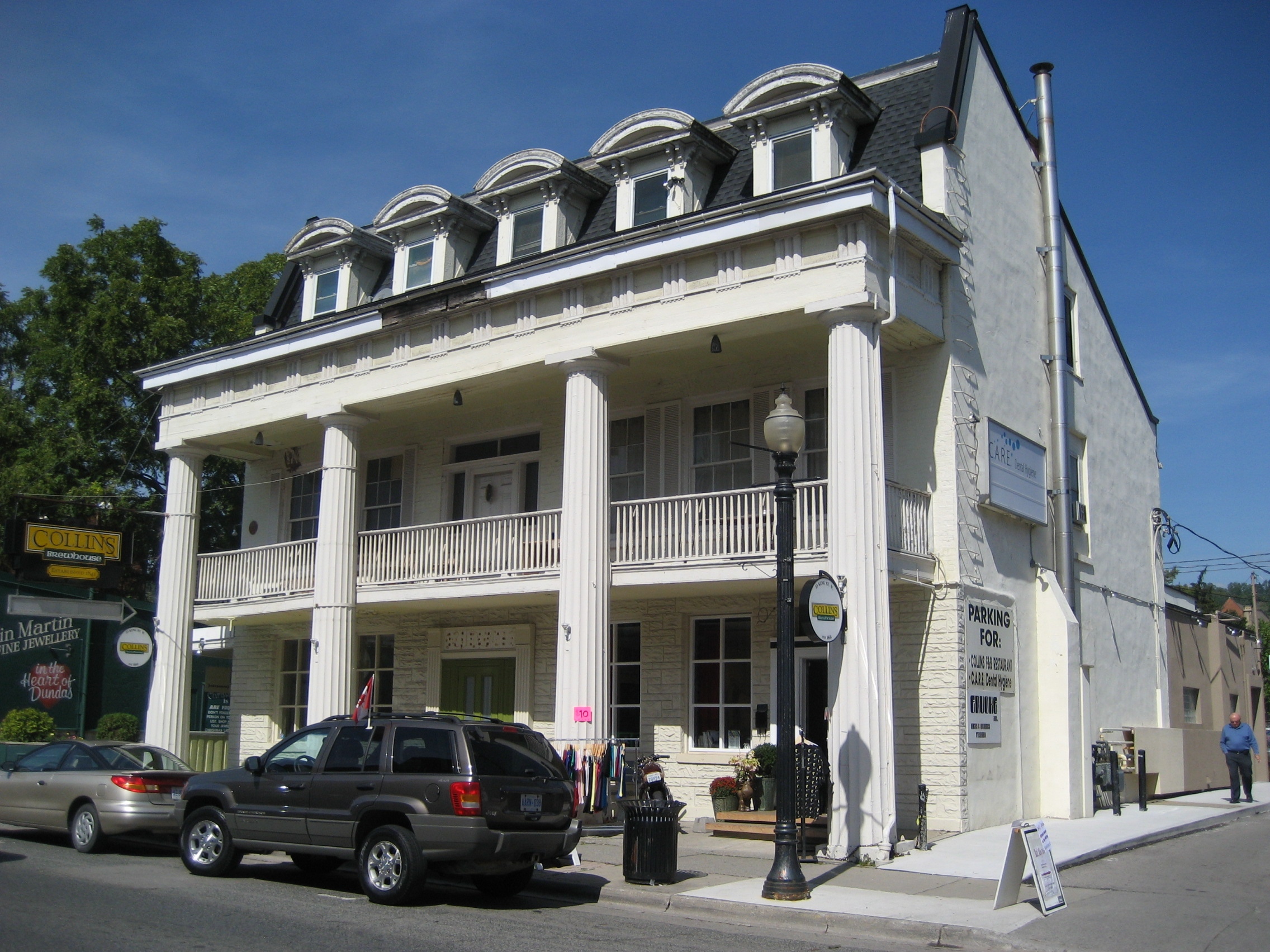
Collins Brewhouse, Originally Collins Hotel

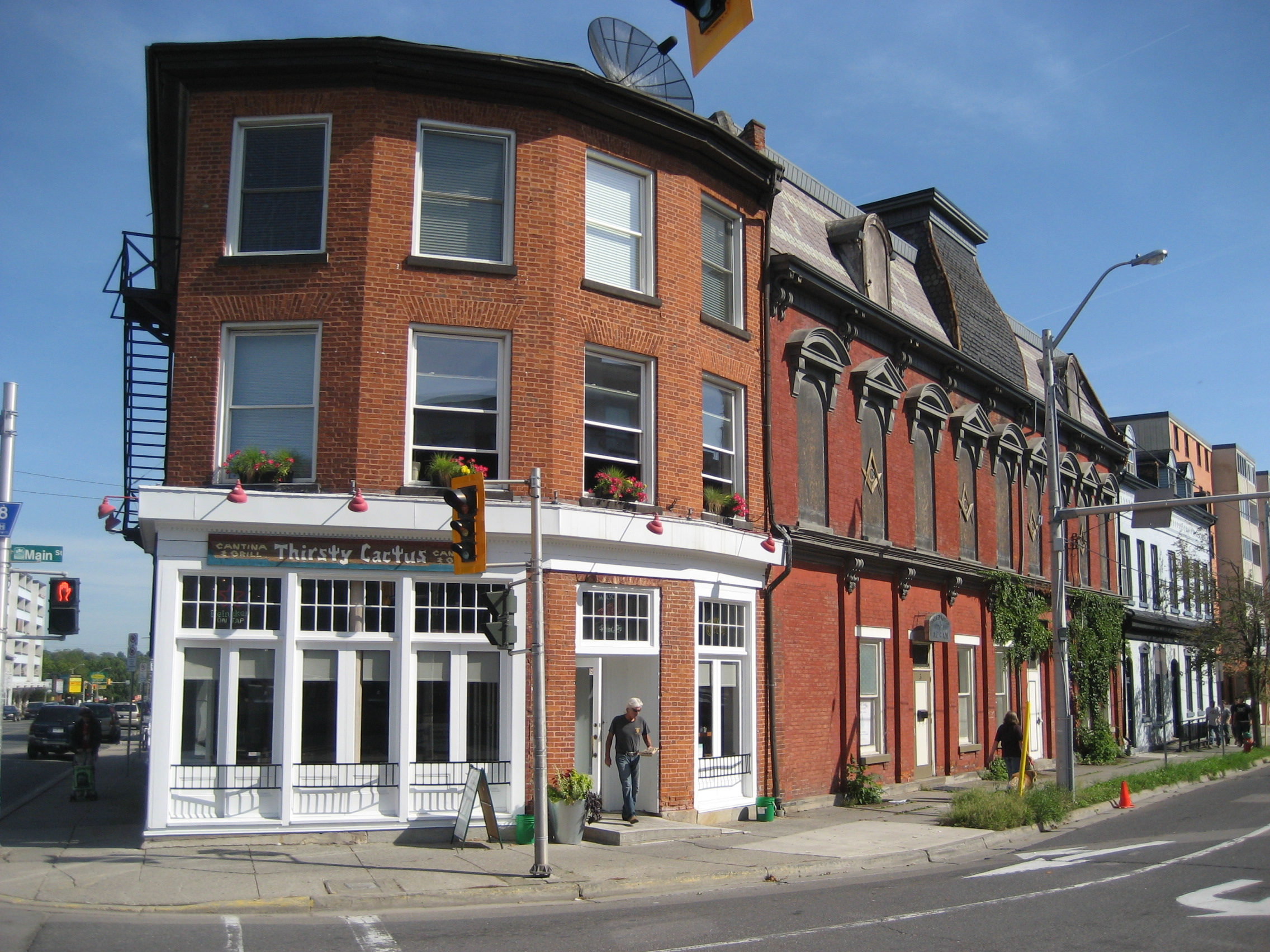
Thirsty Cactus/ Masonic Hall

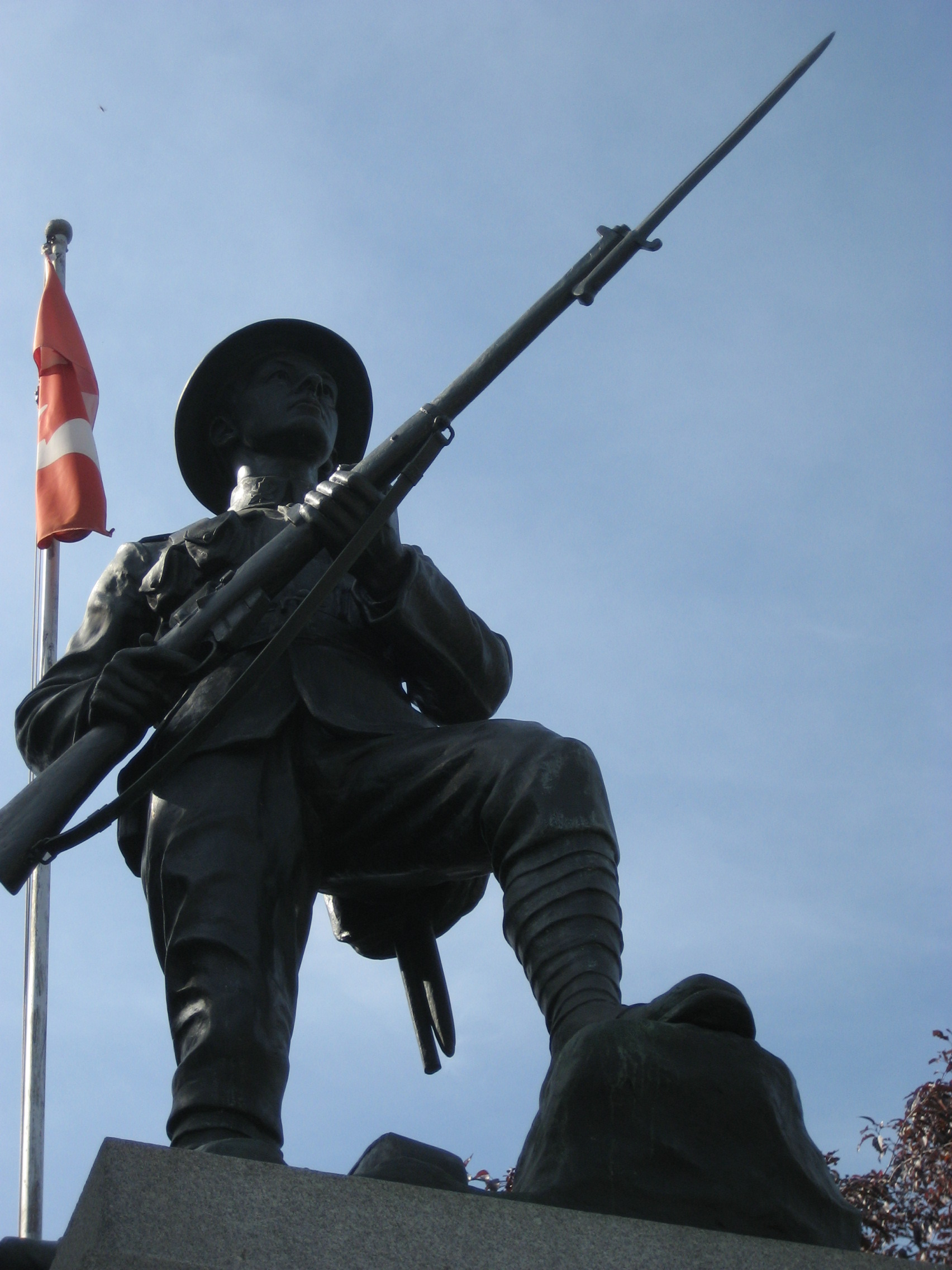
Memorial Square

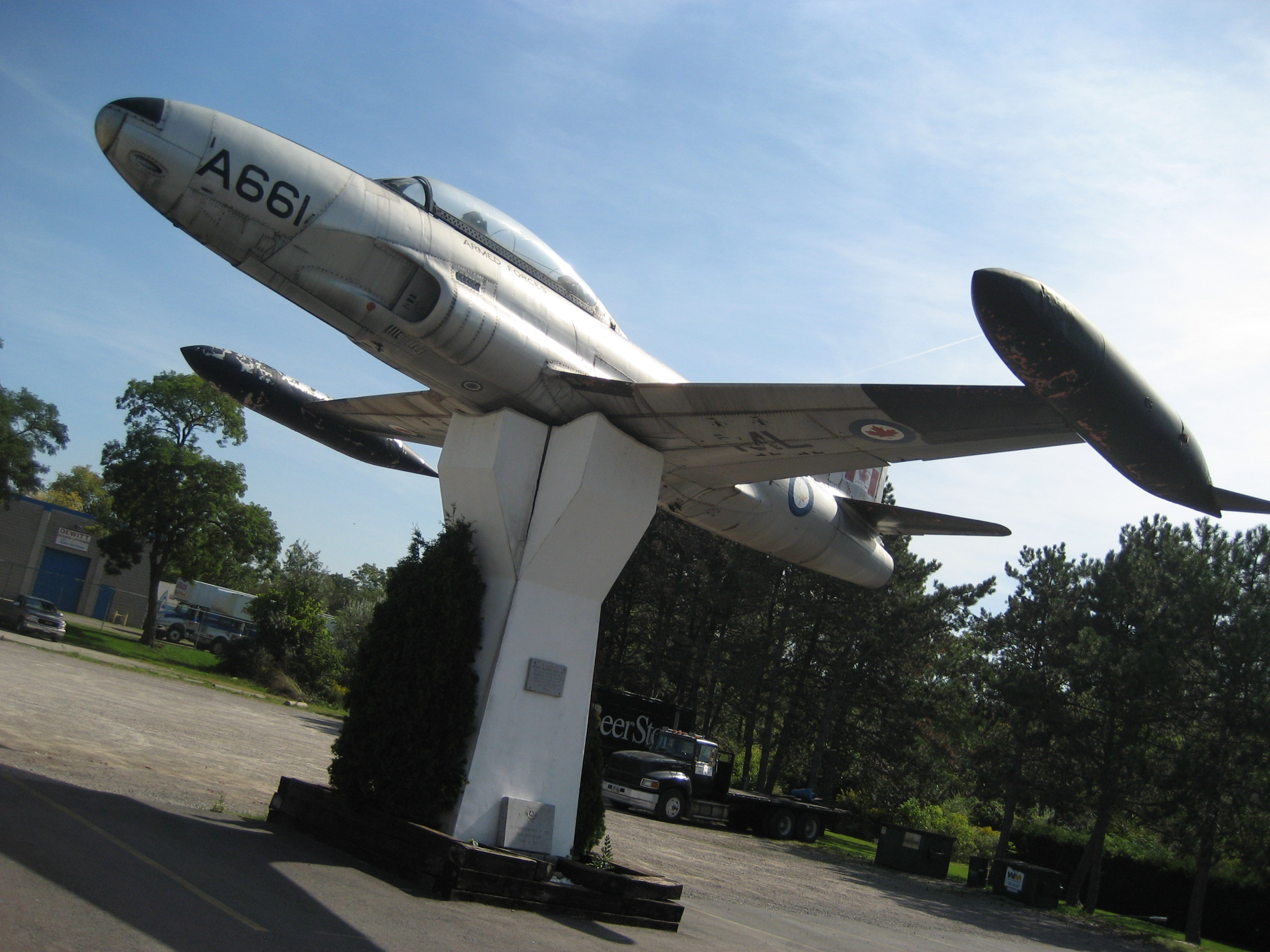
Canadian Armed Forces Jet, Hamilton Air Force Association

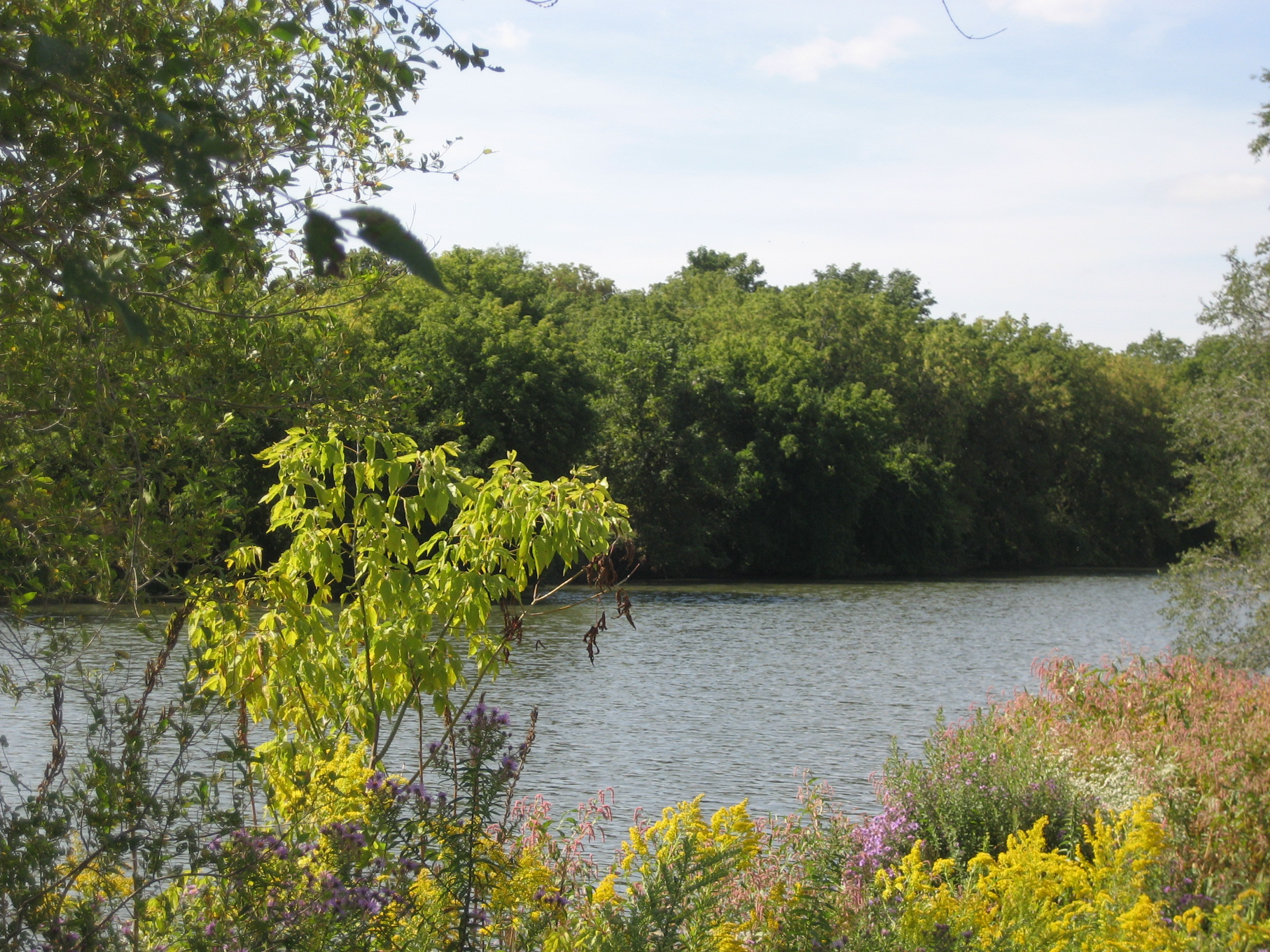
Desjardins Canal

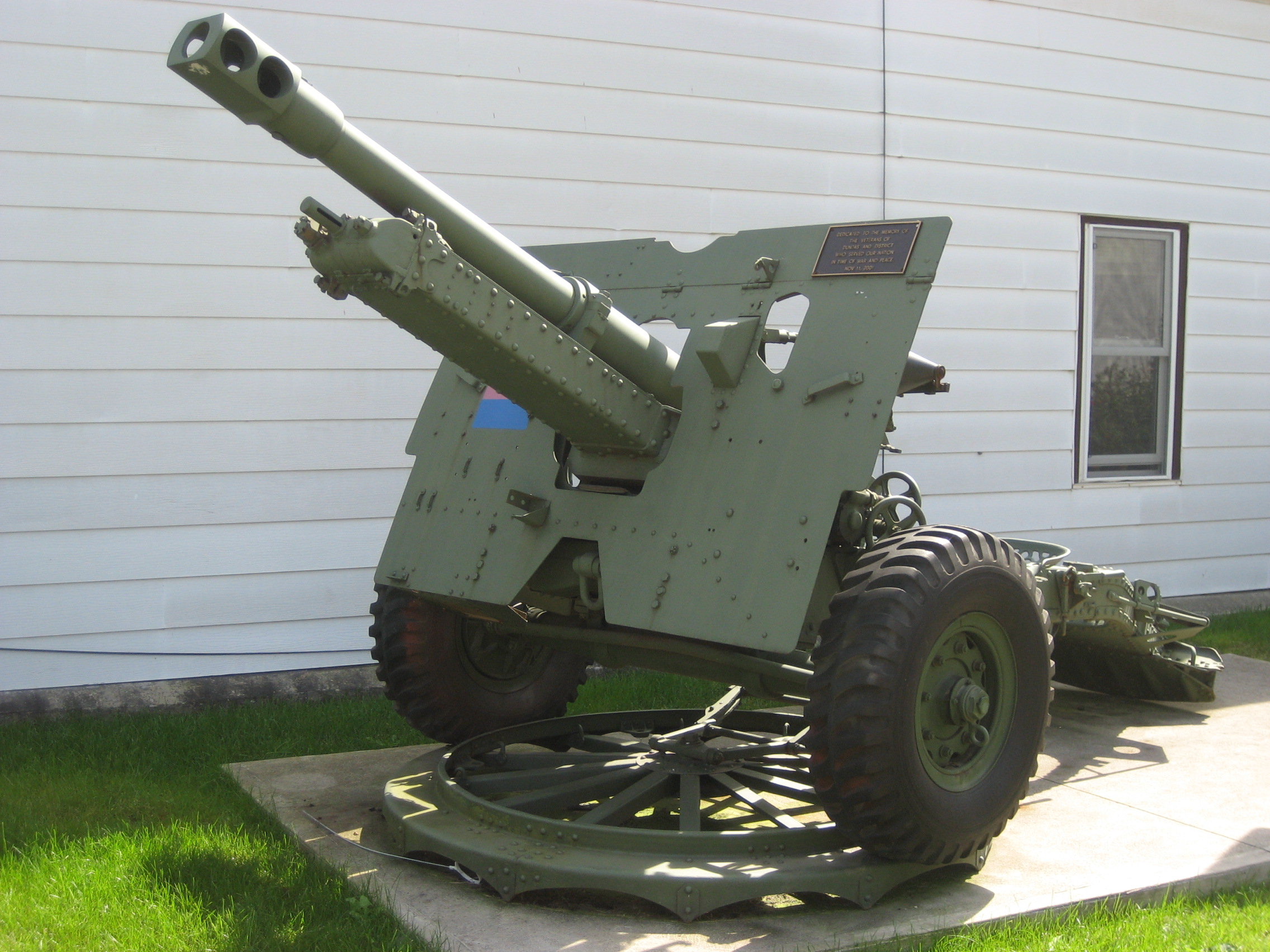
25-Pounder Gun/ Howitzer

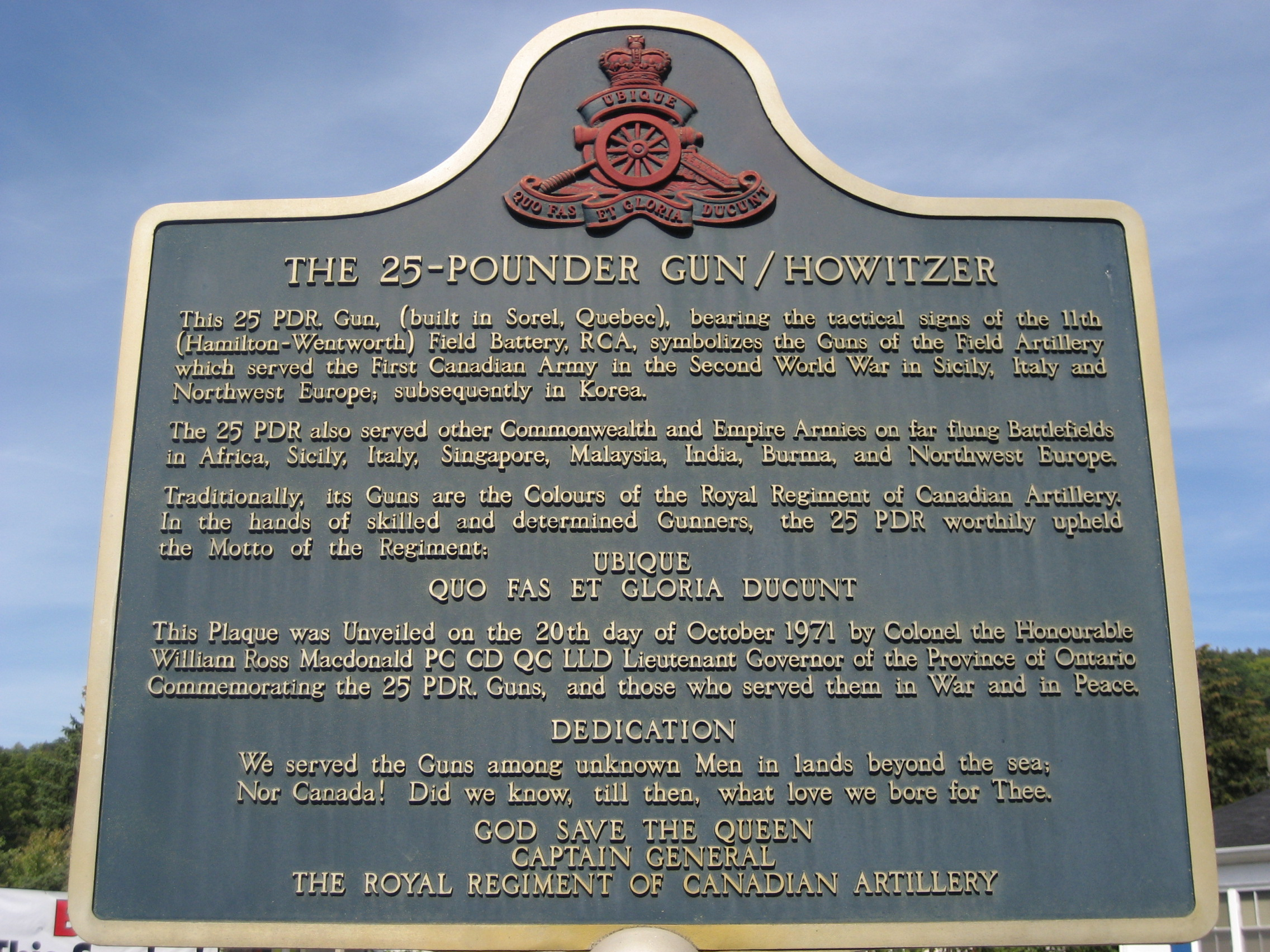
25-Pounder Gun/ Howitzer

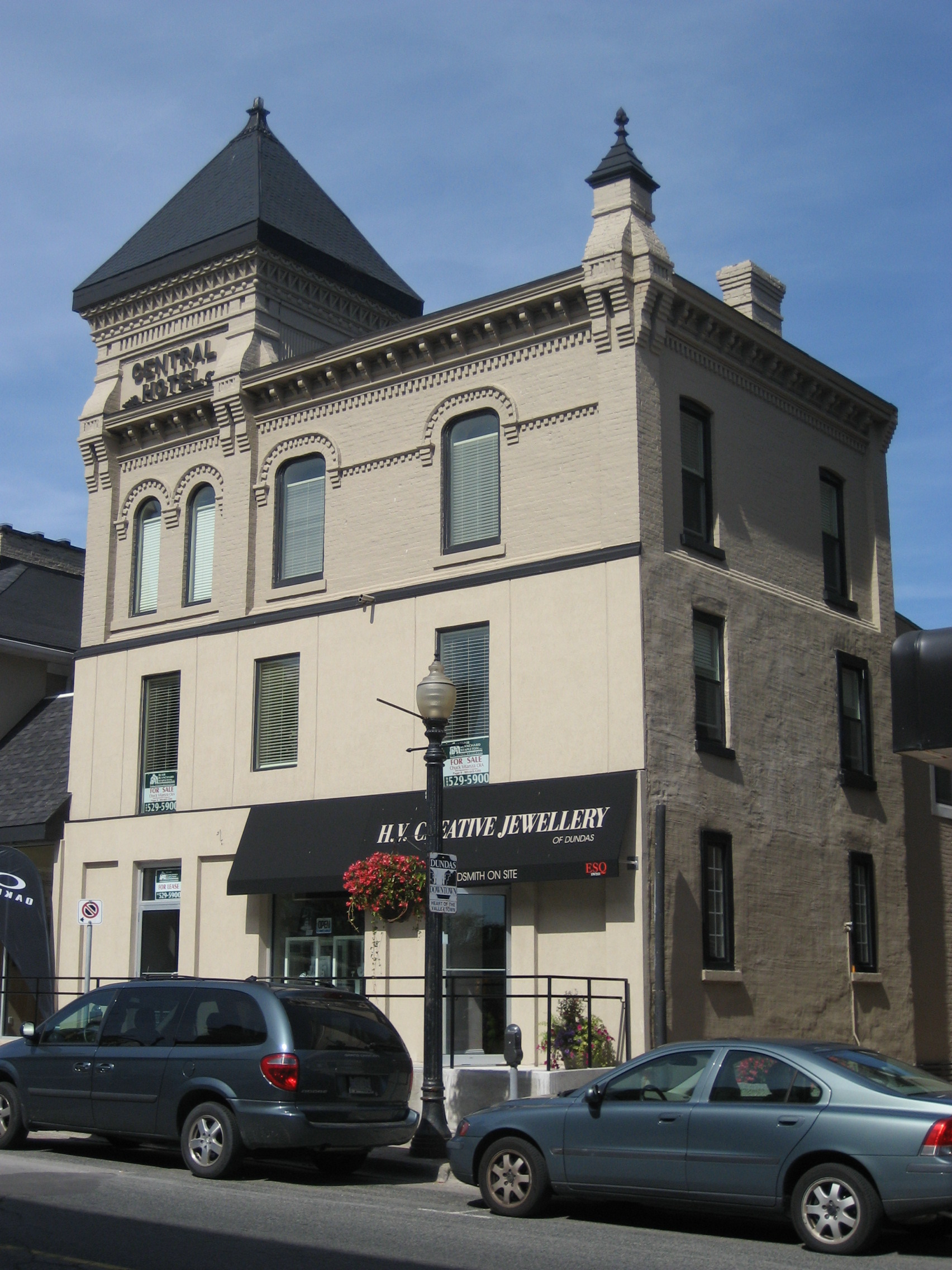
Central Hotel building

King Street starts off as a collector road in the east-end of town in Dundas, Hamilton, Ontario, Canada beside Cootes Paradise and the Desjardins Canal at Olympic Drive and switches to an arterial road at York Street and cuts through the town of Dundas where it ends in the west-end by the CN railway tracks at the base of the Niagara Escarpment. It is a two-way street throughout.

Note: West of the CN railway tracks this road changes its name to Brock Road.

== History ==
On January 1, 2001 the present City of Hamilton was formed from the amalgamation of the Regional Municipality of Hamilton-Wentworth (the metropolitan area of Hamilton and its five surrounding municipalities: Ancaster, Dundas, Flamborough, Glanbrook, and Stoney Creek). Before amalgamation, the City of Hamilton had 331,121 Hamiltonians divided into 100 neighbourhoods. The amalgamated city has 490,268 people in over 200 neighbourhoods and communities. This resulted in several duplicate street names; and there are two separate King Streets found in the present City of Hamilton. One in Dundas and the other in Lower City Hamilton.

The Dundas Valley was formed by retreating glaciers more than 25,000 years ago. Dundas originally was known as Cootes Paradise, named after Captain Cootes of the Kings Royal 8th Regiment and was incorporated as a town in 1847.

The Carnegie Library was the first library to open in Dundas. It opened in 1910 and was funded by a donation from American industrialist, Andrew Carnegie, and the citizens of Dundas. Today it plays a central role in the historic character of the Valley Town as Carnegie Gallery. In 1980 it became the home of the Dundas Art & Craft Association, a non-profit organization.

Dundas was also proclaimed the cactus capital of Canada in 1976. A summertime festival called The Cactus Festival is held in Dundas annually. When it was discovered that Dundas was already internationally recognized for the Cacti produced by the local Ben Veldhuis Cactus Greenhouses, the citizens of Dundas came up with the name, "Cactus Festival" for a summertime festival.

The Desjardins Canal in pioneer days provided the essential means of transportation. Dundas, located at the head of navigation of Lake Ontario and the eastern terminus of the Governor's Road, was thus in a favoured position. However, in 1823 the government authorized the construction of a canal for larger vessels through Burlington sand-bar. Since its completion would make the shallow approach through Coote's Paradise marsh inadequate, Pierre Desjardins, an enterprising settler from France, formed a company in 1826 to build a canal there. Opened on August 16, 1837, it contributed greatly to the development of this region until the completion of the Great Western Railway in 1853, when the Desjardins Canal gradually fell into disuse. By the time the first train entered Dundas in 1895 commercial traffic on the canal had come to an end.

The canal continued to be a popular recreational spot; boats could be rented for fishing, excursions and picnics to La Salle Park, Oaklands and Burlington Beach. In 1966 Dundas Town Council granted permission for the canal basin to be filled in. On July 1, 1967 as part of Canada's Centennial Celebration Dundas' Centennial Park was officially dedicated.

== Hollywood North: The West Wing and others ==
The De Luxe Restaurant is a nostalgic 1950s-style diner used primarily today for film shoots. A number of feature films and television productions have been shot here in Dundas at the De Luxe Restaurant. In 2006 the NBC television serial drama, The West Wing, directed by Christopher Misiano and starring Jimmy Smits and Bradley Whitford was shot here at this location.

Also in 2006, Man of the Year, a political thriller/comedy movie directed by Barry Levinson and featuring Robin Williams and Christopher Walken was shot here. As well, Molly: An American Girl on the Home Front, the third movie in the American Girl film series, tagged as a Disney Channel Original Movie was shot here. It was directed by Joyce Chopra and stars Molly Ringwald.

In 2007, parts of Closing the Ring, a film directed by Richard Attenborough and starring Shirley MacLaine, Christopher Plummer and Neve Campbell was shot in Dundas and at the De Luxe Restaurant. Also in 2007, CIBC Bank used the restaurant for a TV commercial shoot.

== Landmarks ==
Note: Listing of landmarks from west to east.

- Spencer Gorge / Webster's Falls Conservation Area
- Bruce Trail
- Niagara Escarpment
- CN Railway tracks
- Fisher's Mill Park
- Dundas District Elementary School
- Royal Canadian Legion, Branch 36 (building)
- 25-pounder gun / howitzer
- Memorial Square (statue)
- Dundas Lions Memorial Community Centre
- Christian Life Assembly Church
- 150 King West (four-storey apartment complex)
- RONA Cashway Building Centres. Shoppers Drug Mart, is now in its place
  - J L Grightmire Arena, "Market Street Arena" home of the Dundas Real McCoys, (off of Market Street)
- Post Office building / clock tower (c. 1913)
- Central Hotel Building
- Fire E.M.S. Station (Dundas 23)
- De Luxe Restaurant (closed since the 1970s, used primarily now for film shoots) Now called Bangkok Spoon
- Collins Brewhouse (originally Collins Hotel, established 1841)
- Carnegie Gallery
- Thirsty Cactus Cantina & Grill
  - Masonic Hall (Valley Lodge 100, A.F. & A.M.)
- Yorkdale (six-storey apartments)
- Valley Gate Manor Apartments (six stories)
  - Dundas Valley School of Art (off of Ogilvie Street)
- Sydenham Creek
- King's Court (9-storey apartments)
- Kingston Manor (5-storey apartments)
- Centennial Park
- Desjardins Canal
- City of Hamilton Dundas, Wastewater Treatment Plant
- Hamilton Air Force Association (building)
  - Canadian Armed Forces jet
- Hamilton Fire Prevention: Main Office (Station 29)
- Martino Memorial Park
- Cootes Paradise
- Picone Fine Food: a grocery store open since 1915.

== Communities ==
Note: Listing of neighbourhoods from West to East.

- Greensville
- Dundas
- Cootes Paradise

== Images ==
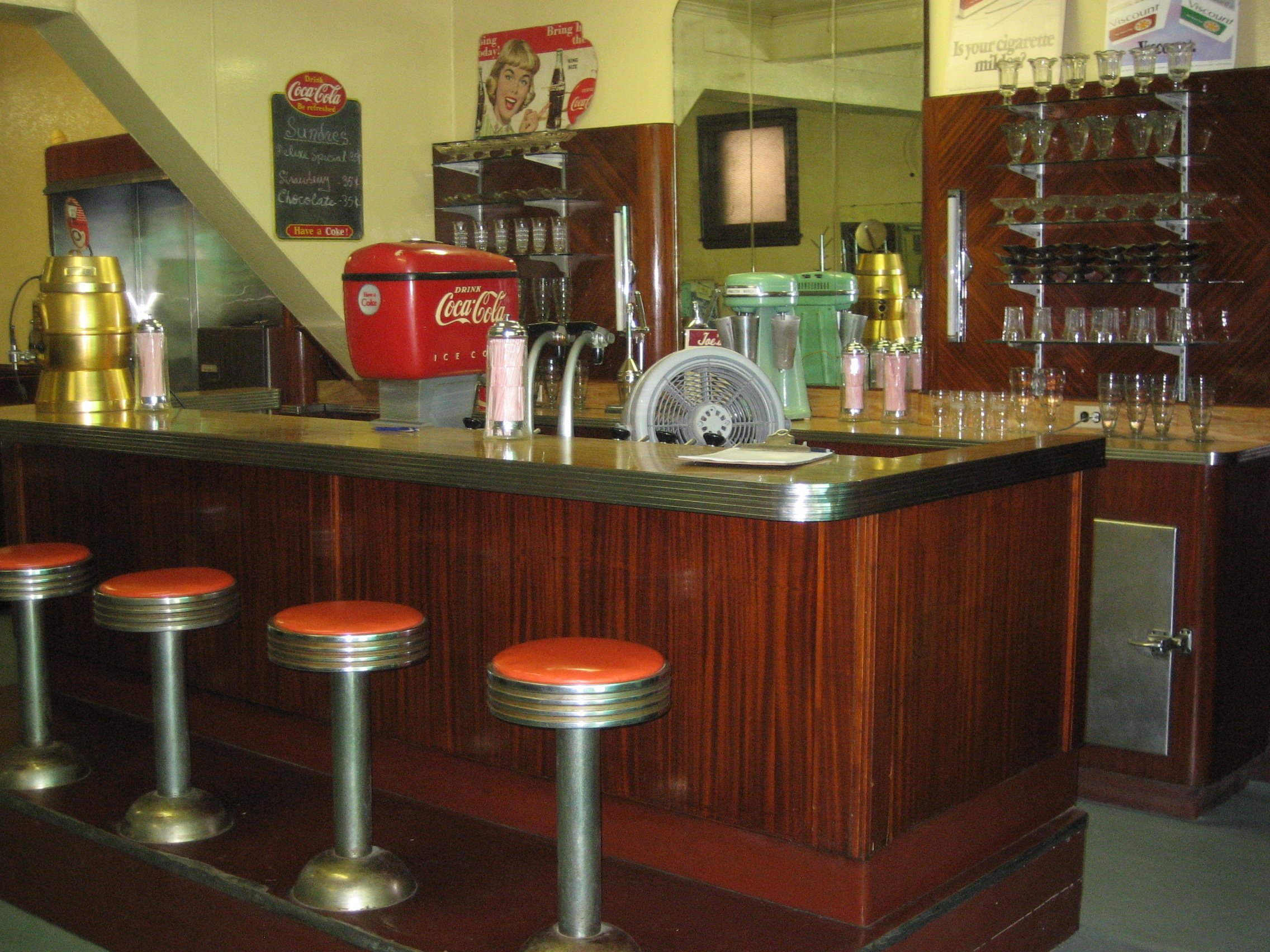
De Luxe Restaurant

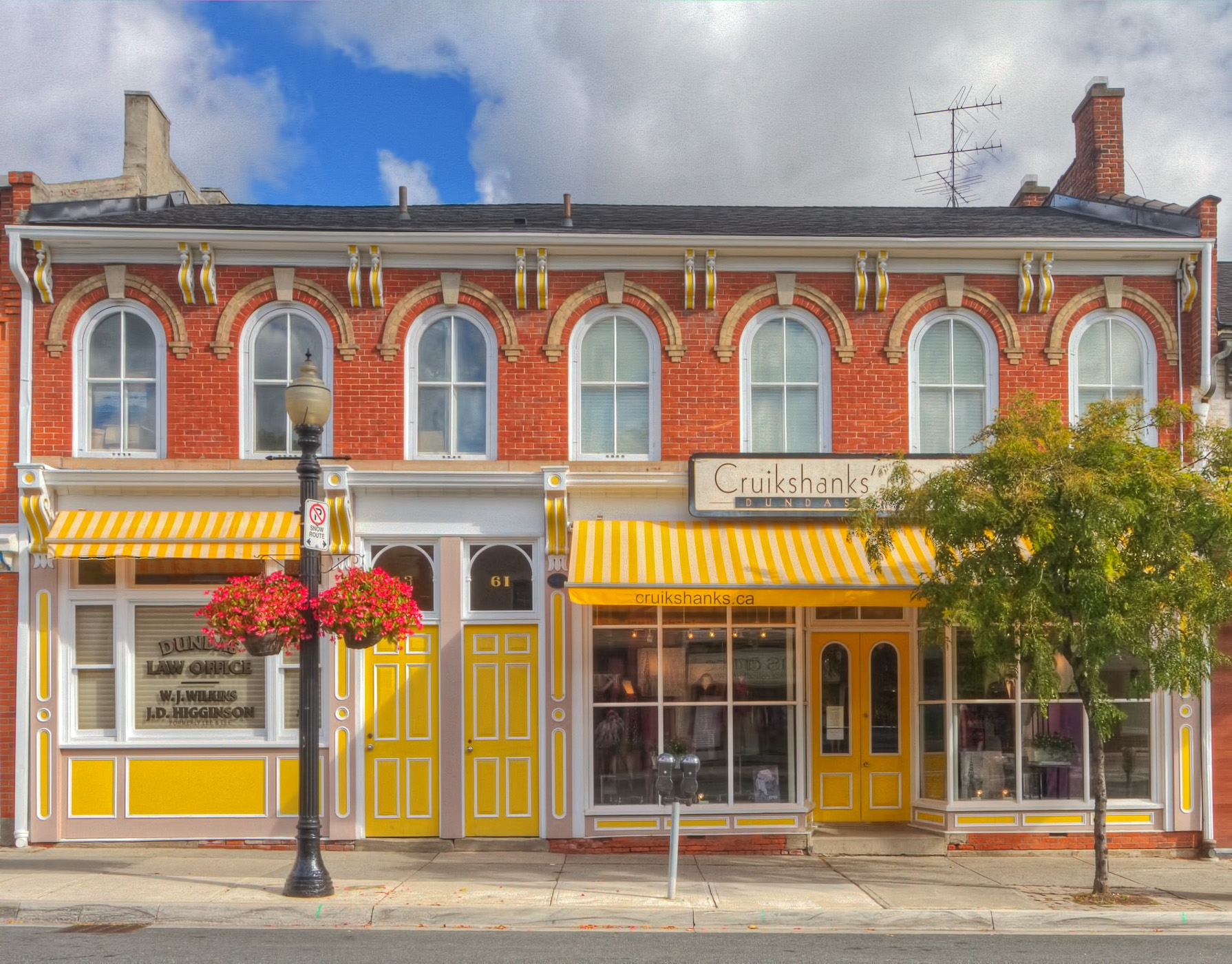
59-63 King Street West
