= Dundas Cactus Festival =

Event held in Dundas, Ontario, Canada

Sign promoting the festival

The Dundas Cactus Festival occurs on the third weekend of August in Dundas, Ontario, Canada, with King Street blocked off from York Road to Market Street, there is a parade on Thursday evening. Following that, from Friday to Sunday, there are live musicians, buskers, arts and crafts, a Family Zone, and vendors.

== History ==
The Dundas Cactus Festival began in 1976 as a festival to mark the beginning of summer. In 1979, the festival was moved to August, with local downtown merchants having sidewalk sales to coincide with it. The Dundas Cactus Festival was inspired by Barend Veldhuis, a Dutch immigrant who ran a large greenhouse specializing in cacti and housed over 200 species.
