= David Vienneau =

Canadian journalist

David Vienneau (1951–2004) was a Canadian journalist. He was born in Hamilton, Ontario and grew up in nearby Dundas. He graduated from the University of Western Ontario school of journalism in 1975 with an honours degree. He began working for the Toronto Star newspaper that same year, becoming its Ottawa bureau chief in 1995. Vienneau moved to television in April 1998 as Ottawa bureau chief at for Global News, where he remained until his death from pancreatic cancer on December 1, 2004.
