= Parkside High School (Dundas, Ontario) =

Closed secondary school

Coordinates: 43.27278°N 79.95263°W

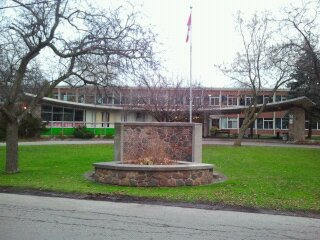
The Front of the School

Parkside High School was located at 31 Parkside Avenue, Dundas, Ontario, and was a member of the Hamilton-Wentworth District School Board (HWDSB). The school opened in 1960 and backed onto the Dundas escarpment. Parkside High School had a 2009–2010 enrollment of 700, and reported that 80% of its graduates attend post-secondary education. The school's mission statement was "Educating students to become lifelong learners and contributing citizens in a challenging, changing, multi-cultural world." The school also offered special education classes and had an ESL program.

In 2008, 2009, 2010, 2011, and 2012, Parkside High School was noted as the school with the most involved students in HWDSB according to Director Malloy's Annual Report.

The HWDSB announced on 15 May 2012 that Parkside High School would close in 2014, citing over $5 million in repair costs and almost 200 empty seats. The students attending Parkside were moved to Dundas Valley Secondary School, which will receive $15 million for renovations if approved by the Ministry of Education.

Parkside closed in June 2014 at the end of the 2013/2014 school year. Demolition of the school began in January 2017.

== Notable alumni ==
- Karen Bertelsen (TV personality)
- Dianne Bos (photographer)
- Andrew Cividino (movie & TV director and screenwriter)
- Darcy Hepner (musician)
- Graeme MacKay (editorial cartoonist)
- Colleen McEdwards (news anchor)
- Richard Oddie (musician)
- Christina Sealey (visual artist & musician)
- Daniel Victor Snaith (musician)
- Elissa Mielke (model/musician)
