= Highland Secondary School (Dundas, Ontario) =

Location
- 310 Governor's Road; Dundas, Ontario, L9H 5P8; Canada; 43.258°N 79.976°W

Information
- School type: High school
- Motto: Quaere Verum ('Seek the Truth')
- Founded: 1966
- Closed: 2014
- School board: Hamilton-Wentworth District School Board
- Grades: 9-12
- Mascot: The Highland Hawks

Highland Secondary School was a high school in Dundas, Ontario that opened in 1966. The school was a member of the Hamilton-Wentworth District School Board, in Ward 13. Highland was originally conceived to be 25% Academic and 75% Vocational, but evolved into a fully comprehensive secondary school. Only 60% of Highland Secondary School students who graduated pursued post-secondary education, making Highland one of the lowest in the board. Highland Secondary was renamed Dundas Valley Secondary in June 2014, when nearby Parkside Secondary closed.

== Technological programs ==
Highland Secondary School offered five specialized technological programs that gave interested students training in a specific field of interest. The program fields were: Transportation, Construction, Precision Machining, Electronic Design, Communication – specialties in cabinet making, pneumatics, aviation.

== Program highlights ==
Highland Secondary School took part in the following programs:

- Variety of courses including: LDCC, Applied, Academic, Open, college, Workplace, university
- Award-winning arts program: Music, Art, Drama
- Yearbook – 2 credit course
- Student Success team of teachers to guide, mentor, and track all students
- Individual timetabling for students considered to be at risk
- Study Hall at lunch for Grade 9 and 10s
- In-class OSSLT preparation
- S.T.E.P. (Summer Transitions program for Grade 8 – 9)
- Caring Adult program

== Clubs and activities ==
Highland Secondary School offered the following clubs and activities:

- Jr. Concert Band, Concert Band, Symphonic Band, Sr. Jazz Band
- Badminton
- Curling
- Basketball
- Alpine Skiing and Snowboarding Teams
- Track and Field
- Baseball
- Golf
- Cross-Country
- Soccer
- Tennis
- Touch Football
- Volleyball
- Football (male)
- Waterpolo
- Hockey
- Indoor Track
- Councils (Student, Grad, Music, Visual Arts, Boys’ Athletics, Girls’ Athletics)
- HAVEN (social justice) / WAC (World Awareness)
- Highland Writers' Guild / Drama Student Federation
- Leadership Camp / DECA
- Feel the Power, Feel the Fit (Girls’ Fitness)
- Library / Chess / Model Building / Philosophy/ Sound & Light / Anime
- Knitting
- Cancer Awareness
- Friends of Diversity
- Dance Team
- GLOW
- Roseberry's Board Games Club

== See also ==
- List of high schools in Ontario
