= Dundas, Ontario =

Community in Hamilton, Ontario, Canada

Dundas
- Community (Dissolved town)
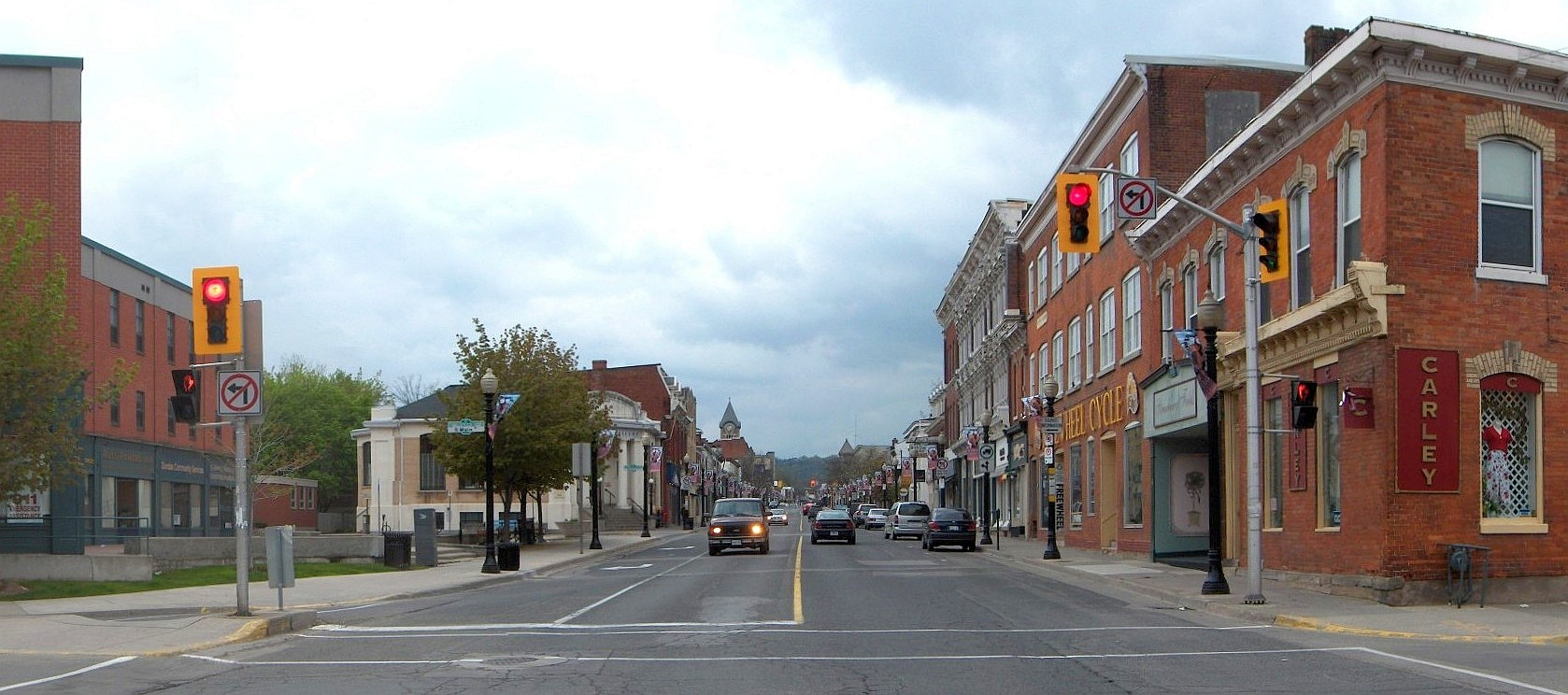
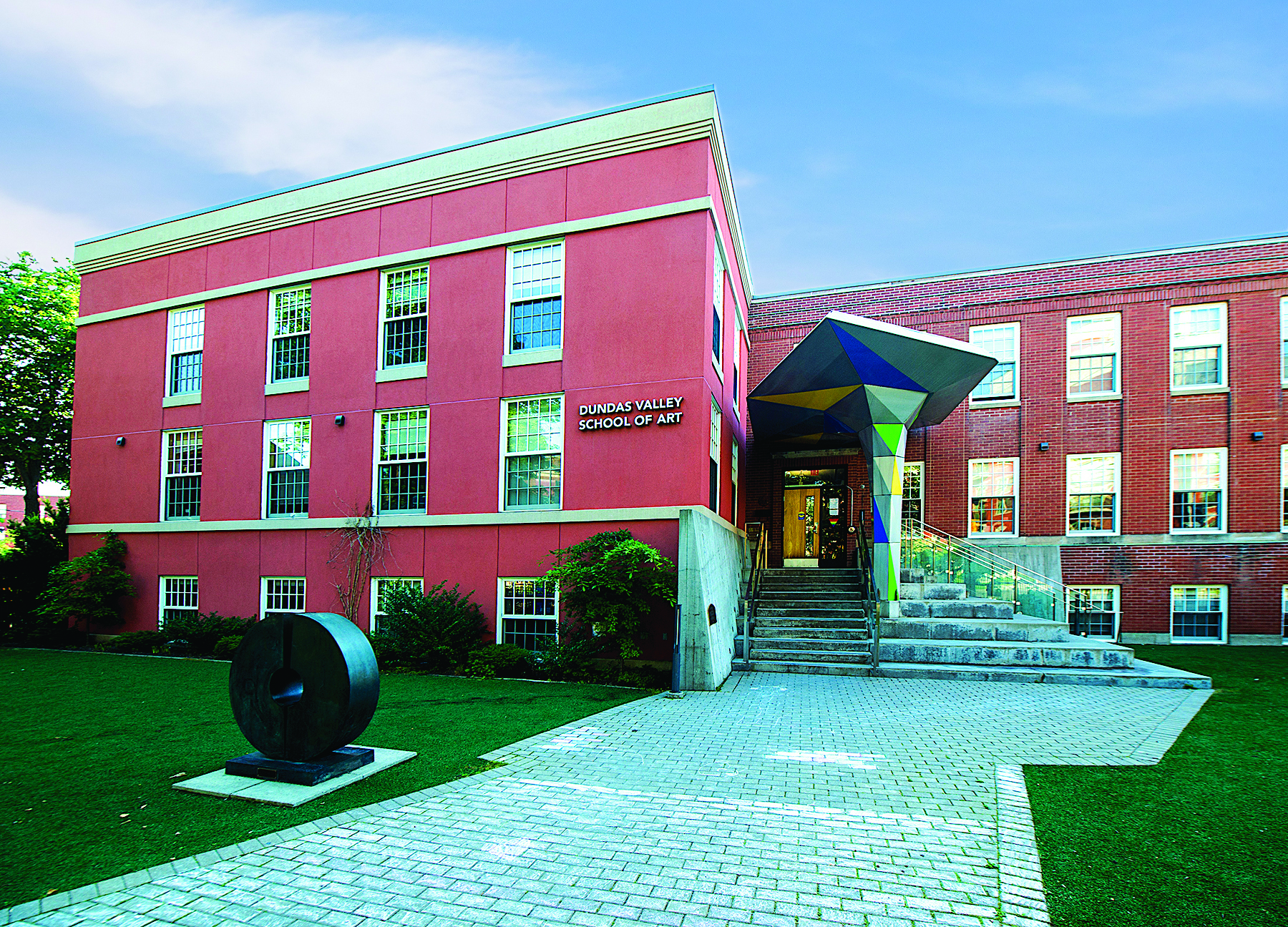
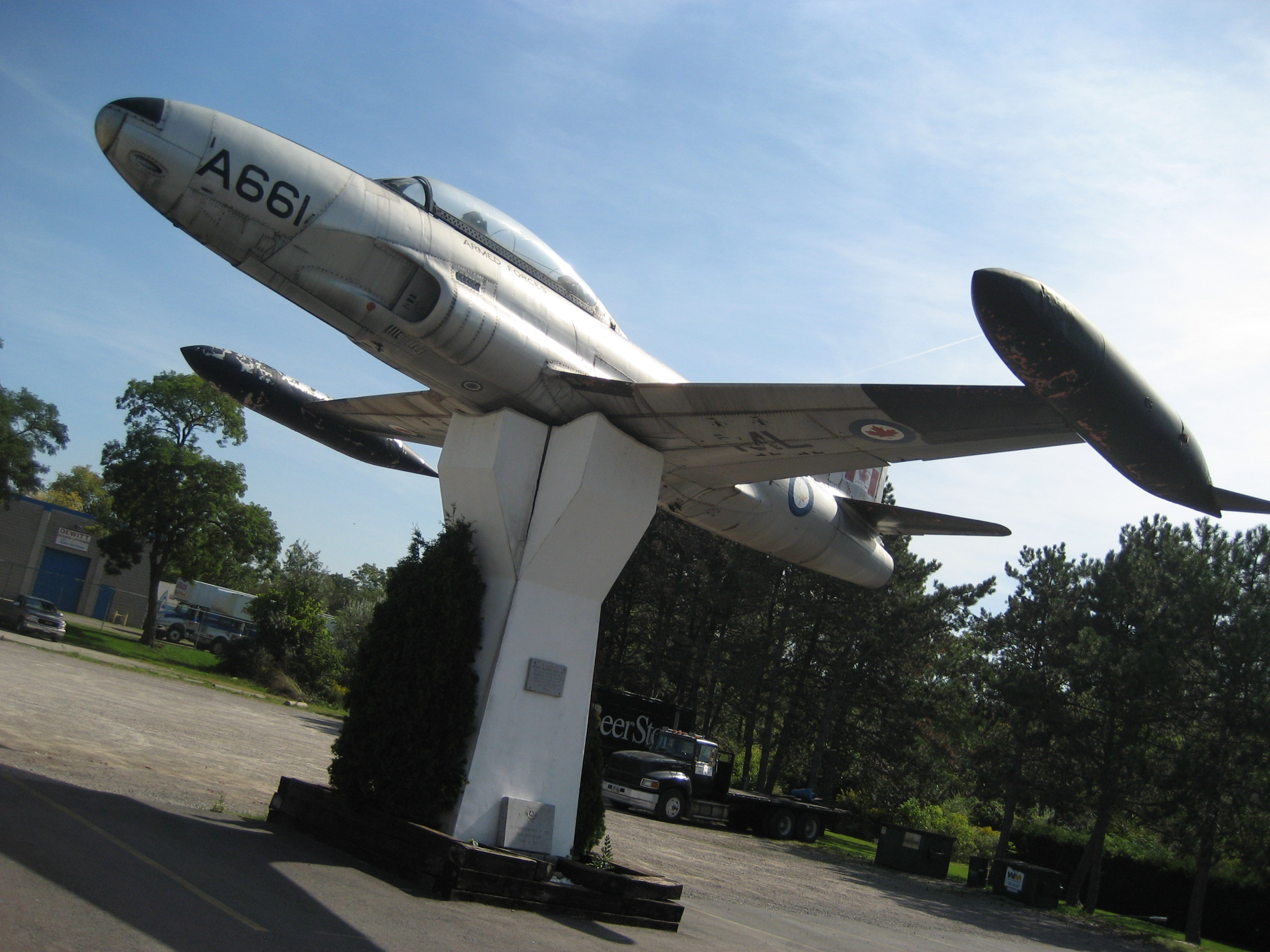
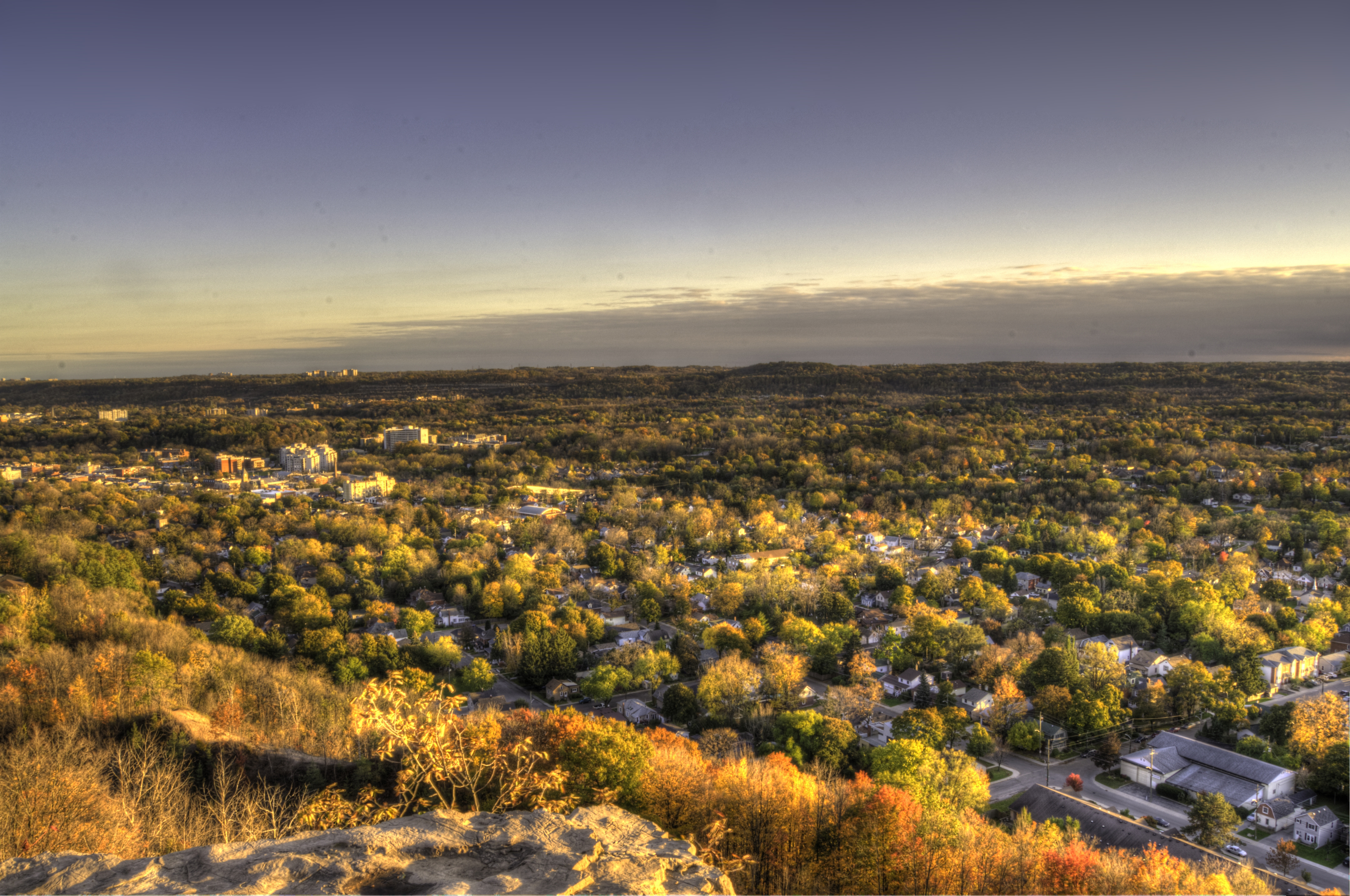
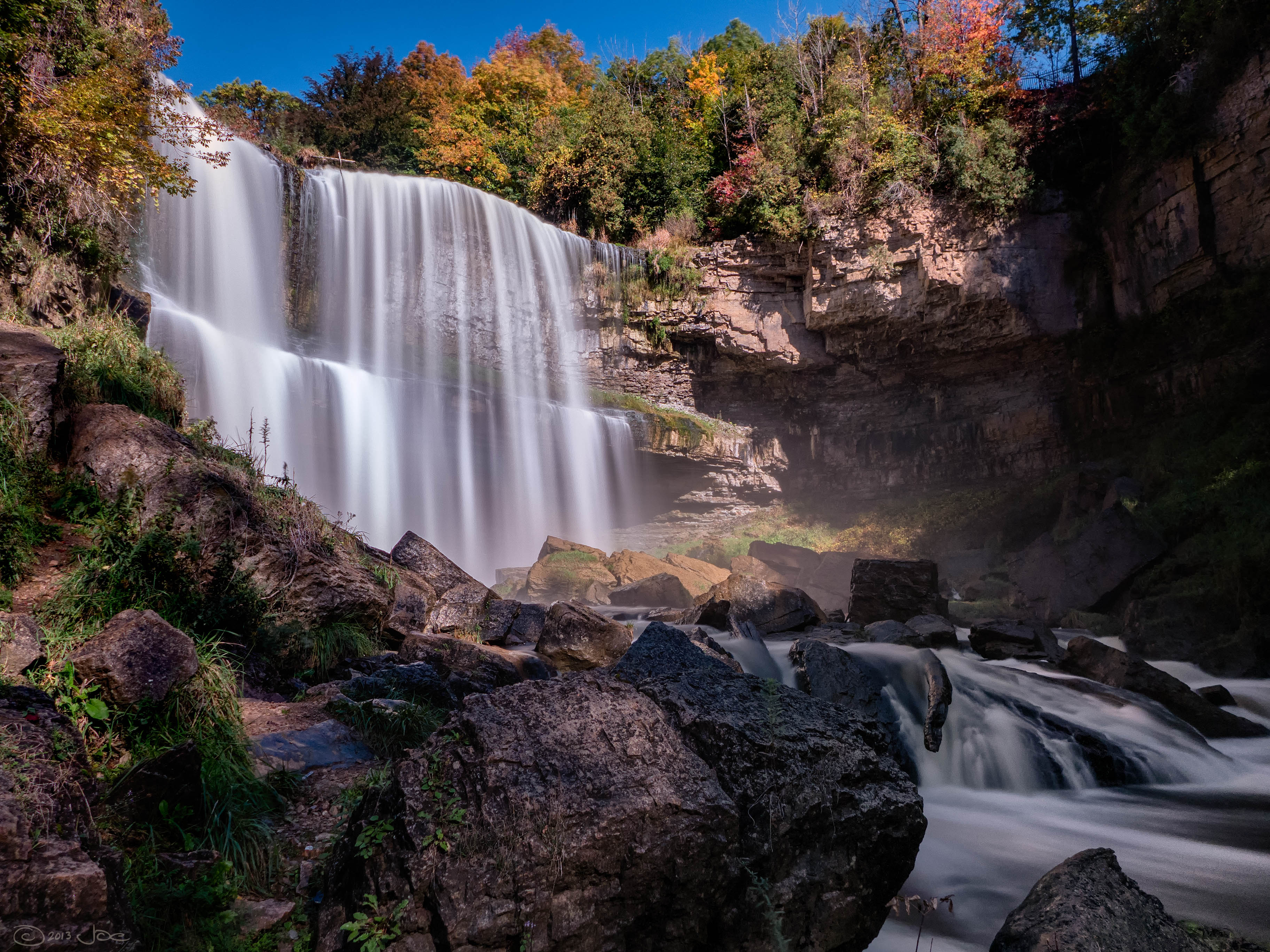
- Downtown Dundas Dundas Valley School of Art Hamilton Air Force Association Skyline of Dundas Webster's Falls
- Nickname: "Valley Town"
- Location within City of Hamilton
- Coordinates: 43°15′58″N 79°57′17″W
- Country: Canada
- Province: Ontario
- City: Hamilton
- Incorporated: 1847; 179 years ago (town)
- Amalgamated: January 1, 2001; 25 years ago

Government
  - MP: John-Paul Danko (Liberal)
  - MPP: Sandy Shaw (NDP)

Area
  - Total: 23.31 km^{2} (9.00 sq mi)

Population (2021)
  - Total: 24,154
  - Density: 1,036.2/km^{2} (2,684/sq mi)
- Time zone: UTC−05:00 (EST)
  - Summer (DST): UTC−04:00 (EDT)
- Forward sortation area: L9H
- Area codes: 905, 289, and 365
- Highways: Highway 8; Highway 99

Dundas (/ˈdʌnˌdæs/) is a community and urban district in the city of Hamilton, Ontario, Canada. It is nicknamed Valley Town because of its topographical location at the bottom of the Niagara Escarpment on the western edge of Lake Ontario. The population has been stable for decades just above 20,000, largely because it has not annexed rural land from the protected Dundas Valley Conservation Area.

Notable events are the Buskerfest in early June and the Dundas Cactus Festival in August.

== History and politics ==
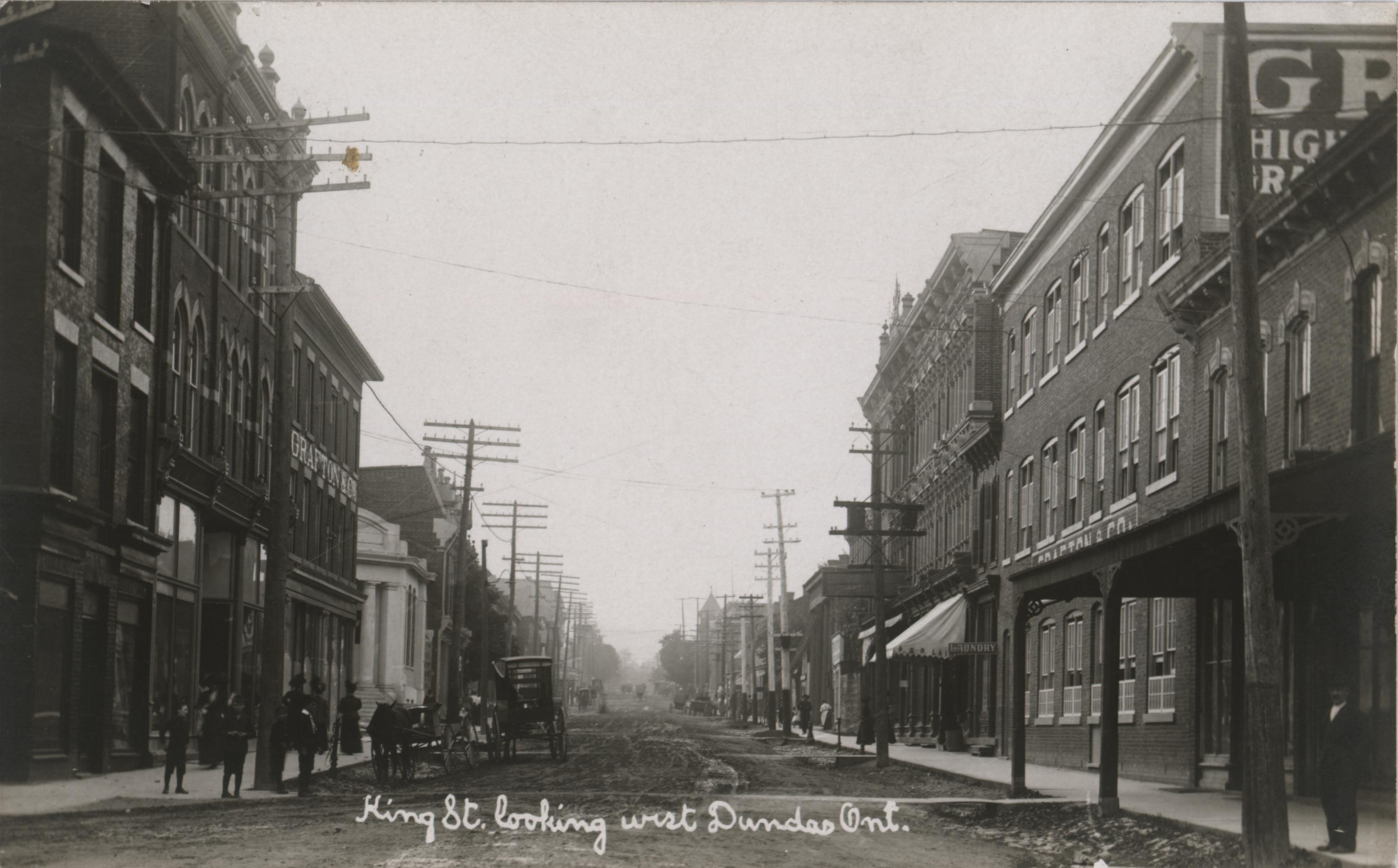
King Street in Dundas

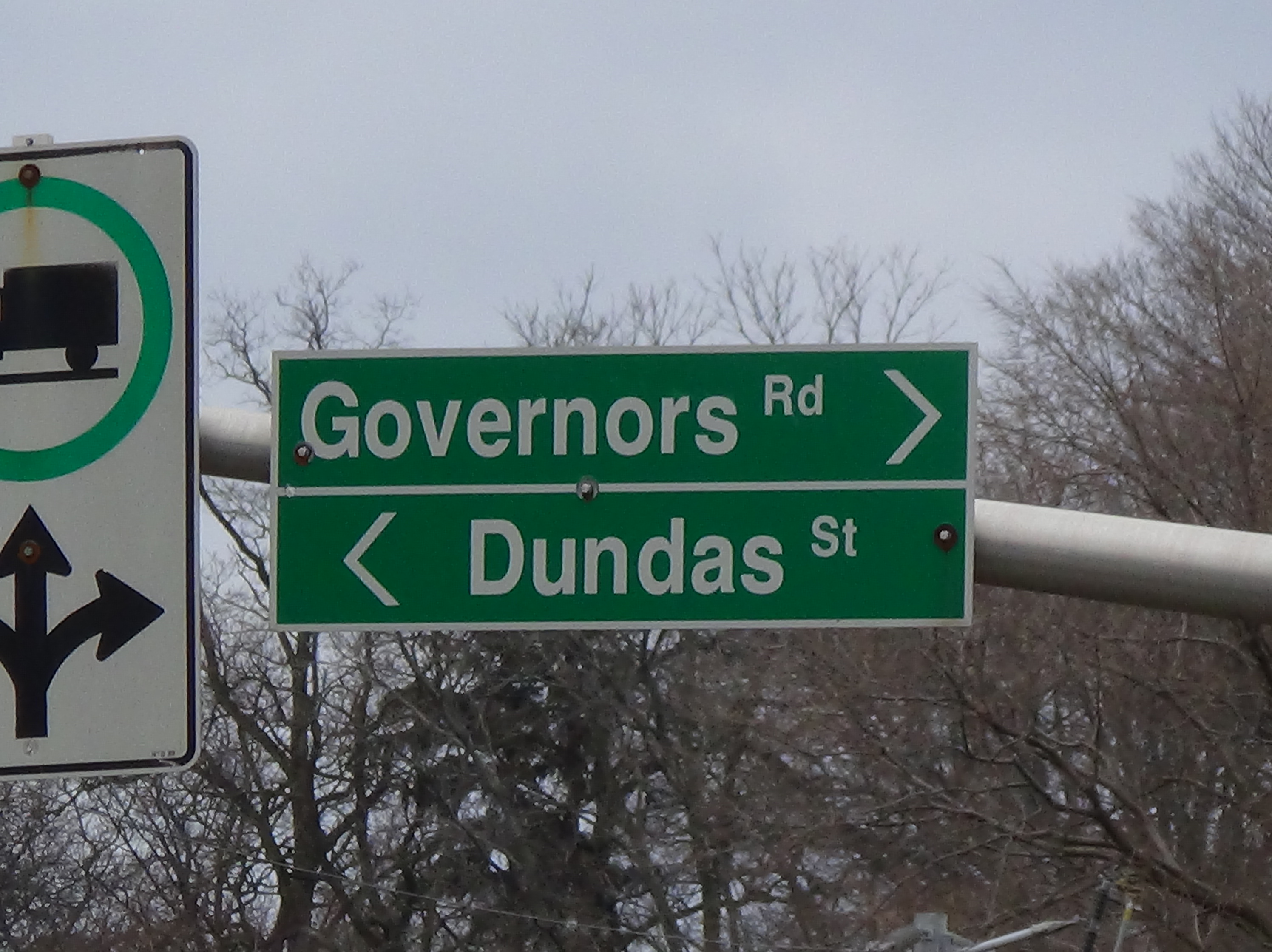
Dundas Street passes through and reverts to its historic alternate name in Dundas

=== History and politics to 1974 ===
Dundas was a prime location for hunting wildfowl, hence a "hunter's paradise," and was unofficially named Coote's Paradise. It was renamed Dundas in 1814. It was named after Dundas Street (also known as Governor's Road) that passed through the village, the road in turn named after Scottish politician Henry Dundas who died in 1811. Dundas is located along the street, which runs between Toronto and London, and is one of the earliest routes used by Ontario's first settlers. The street is still known as Governors Road in parts, and both names are used in Dundas. It is designated Hamilton Road 99 and was formerly Highway 99, though changes to the historic road grid means the street is no longer a through artery to the east. An historical plaque commemorating Dundas Street is located on Governors Road.

In 1846, this "manufacturing village" had a population of just over 1,700. The Desjardins Canal had been completed and connected the community with Lake Ontario, allowing for convenient shipping of goods. A great deal of cut stone was obtained from the "mountain," and much of it was shipped to Toronto. There were six chapels or churches, a fire company and a post office. Industry included two grist mills, a furniture factory, a textile mill, and two foundries (for making steam engines). Tradesmen of various types also worked here. Four schools, six taverns, three breweries and a bank agency were operating. Dundas was incorporated in 1847 from parts of West Flamborough Township and Ancaster Township in Wentworth County, Canada West.

The Great Western Railway (GWR) put their line through Dundas in 1853, but it was not until 1864 that the first Dundas station was built. By 1869 the population was 3,500 and was known as a small manufacturing centre.

In the late 18th and early 19th centuries, Dundas enjoyed considerable economic prosperity through its access to Lake Ontario via the Desjardins Canal and was an important town in Upper Canada and Canada West. It was later surpassed as the area's economic powerhouse by Hamilton, but for decades it led in importance.

With the establishment of McMaster University nearby in west Hamilton in 1930, Dundas gradually became a bedroom community of the university faculty and students, with a thriving arts community. Dundas has a large community of potters, and several studio shows and town walking tours feature their work each year.

== Demographics ==
The 2001 census population of Dundas was 24,394.

Visible minority status:

- 1.41% South Asian
- 1.19% Chinese
- 0.79% Black
- 2.32% Other Minorities

Religion:

- 43.57% Protestant
- 26.94% Catholic
- 19.83% No religious affiliation
- 3.62% Jewish
- 6.04% Other religions

Age characteristics of the population:

- 0–14 years: 18.29%
- 15–64 years: 63.53%
- 65 years and over: 18.18%

== Culture ==
=== Fine arts ===
The Dundas Valley School of Art

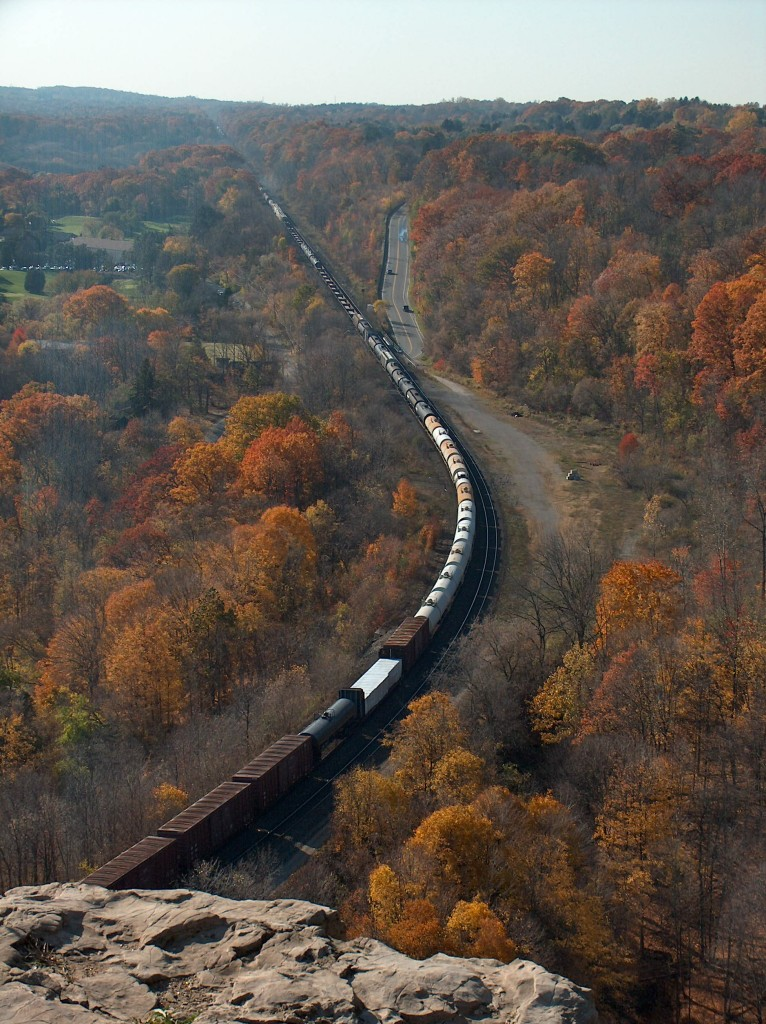
Dundas escarpment as seen from Dundas Peak, located in the abutting district of Flamborough

The Dundas Museum & Archives, located at 139 Park St. West, was established in 1956. Their collections, exhibits, and events showcase how Canadian history and geography have unfolded in the unique Dundas Valley. Several local events also occur at the Museum, including art shows, book launches, community celebrations, and more.

Dundas is home to the Dundas Valley School of Art. Marion Farnan and Emily Dutton established it in 1964. It became a non-profit corporation three years later. Since 1970, it has been located in the former Canada Screw Works building from the 1860s.

The Carnegie Gallery is housed in the 1910 Carnegie library building and celebrated its 25th anniversary in 2005. It is run by the Dundas Art & Craft Association and hosts art exhibitions, book readings, concerts, McMaster custom framing and a gift shop.

=== Music ===
"Dundas, Ontario" is also the title of a song from the album Start Breaking My Heart by the artist Caribou (formerly Manitoba), a native of the town. Dundas' sobriquet The Valley Town is used as the title of a song on the album Mountain Meadows by the band Elliott Brood; one of the band members, Casey Laforet, spent part of his childhood in Dundas. The town has produced other independent artists, including Junior Boys, Orphx, Koushik, and smaller bands such as Winter Equinox and The Dirty Nil. Folk singer Stan Rogers, who died in an airplane fire in 1983, lived in Dundas. He grew up in the Hannon area and moved to Dundas as an adult. He is best remembered for his songs about Canada's Atlantic provinces.

Dundas is home to the Dundas Valley Orchestra. The DVO is an amateur, community orchestra and was founded in the fall of 1978 by Arthur Vogt. Many have made the DVO a way station en route to successful musical careers. Former conductors include Rosemary Thomson.

Dundas is also the home of Dundas Concert Band. The Dundas Concert Band was established in 1873 as a military band. In 1923, the band was renamed "The Dundas Citizens' Band" and became known as the Dundas Concert Band in the early 1940s. The Dundas Concert Band's "Concerts in the Park" series has performed at the Dundas Driving Park Bandshell venue since 1958.

Dundas Conservatory of Music is located in historic downtown Dundas; it has been providing musical instruction in the community for 30 years.

=== Theatre ===
Dundas Little Theatre (DLT), a community theatre based in Dundas, was founded in 1960. In 1980, it moved from performing in school auditoriums into the Garstin Centre of the Arts, a purpose-built theatre named for one of the theatre’s founders and designed by architect Trevor Garwood-Jones. Since January 1961, DLT has produced more than 200 plays. Using amateur actors and volunteer stage crew, DLT produces at least three plays a year. Its policy is to select an annual playbill of “good plays that are not frequently undertaken by other local community groups ... one classic play, one comedy, and one edgy contemporary drama.”

=== Film ===
Because of Dundas' 19th-century downtown architecture, films such as Haven, Cabin Fever, Wrong Turn, and others have made use of its location. In December 2005, major filming was completed for Man of the Year, starring Robin Williams. Mr. Williams delighted townsfolk, taking time for pictures and autographs in the downtown core.

In early December 2004, The West Wing did some filming, remaking parts of Dundas (Town hall, a residence, and Deluxe Restaurant) into New Hampshire locales. The three episodes aired in late January and early February 2005. Several dozen enthusiasts of this HBO series braved chilly weather to witness the snail's pace of television filming and grab autographs and photos with celebrities.

In September 2007, a scene of The Incredible Hulk was filmed around the exterior and inside the DeLuxe Restaurant in Dundas, and other scenes were filmed at different locations in Hamilton.

From 2004 to 2007, parts of the YTV program Dark Oracle were also filmed in Dundas.

From 2015 until the present, parts of the W Network series The Good Witch have been filmed in Dundas.

=== Sports ===
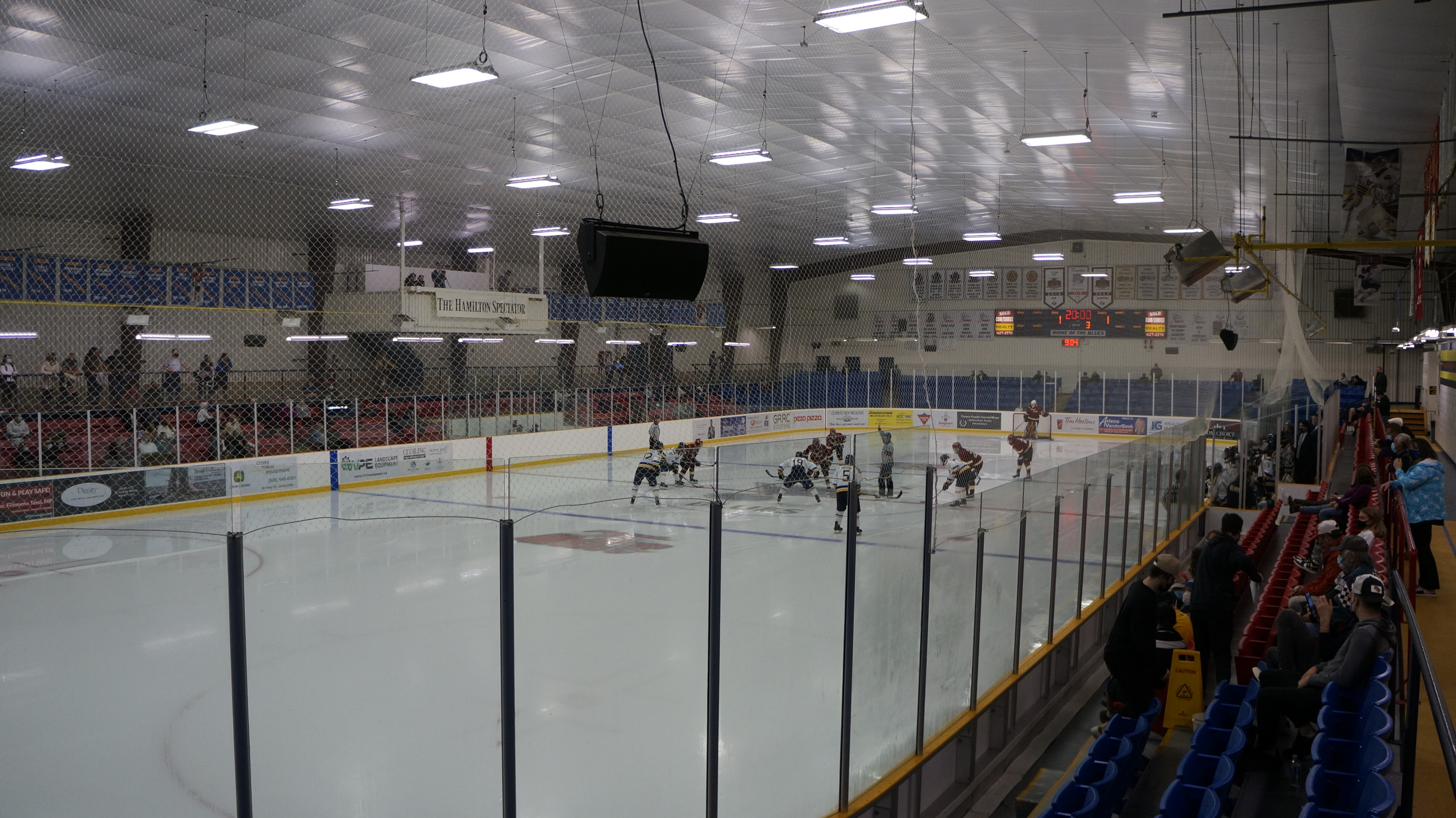
The J.L. Grightmire/Market Street Arena

The Dundas Blues are a junior ice hockey team from Dundas, and they play in the Provincial Junior Hockey League.

The Dundas Real McCoys are a senior ice hockey team from Dundas. They play in the Ontario Hockey Association's Allan Cup Hockey league. The Real McCoys won the 1986 Hardy Cup as Senior "AA" champions of Canada and are the two-time defending Allan Cup champions at the highest level of senior hockey in Canada.

On April 3, 2010, NHL Commissioner Gary Bettman named Dundas the winner of the 2010 Kraft Hockeyville competition during a live announcement on Hockey Night in Canada. As a result of being named the winner, the community received $100,000 CAD in arena upgrades and got to host an NHL pre-season game between the Ottawa Senators and Buffalo Sabres prior to the 2010–11 season.

After existing for 93 years, the Dundas Chiefs senior baseball team folded in 2010. The Chiefs had won 11 Ontario Baseball Association provincial titles over the years, with the first in 1961 and the last in 2001. Their success included three straight titles from 1976 to 1978 and back-to-back titles in 1987 and 1988.

== Schools ==
- Central Park – Elementary School (Closed)
- Cornerstones Hamilton Special Needs Services @ Dundas Valley Secondary School - Adult Day Program
- Dundana – Elementary School
- Dundas Central Public – Elementary School
- Dundas District – High School (Closed June 1982)
- Dundas District – Middle School (Closed November 5, 2007)
- Dundas Valley Montessori School – Private Elementary School
- Dundas Valley Secondary School – High School (Formed by the amalgamation of Highland and Parkside Secondary Schools)
- Highland – High School (Closed June 2014-amalgamated with Parkside Secondary School)
- St. Augustine – Catholic Elementary
- St. Bernadette – Catholic Elementary
- Sir William Osler – Elementary School
- Parkside – High School (Closed June 2014-amalgamated with Highland Secondary School)
- Pleasant Valley – Elementary School (Closed)
- Providence Christian School – Independent Elementary School
- SiTE Schools Dundas - Private Montessori based High School (Closed)
- University Gardens – Elementary School (Closed)
- Valley – Elementary School (Closed June 1978)
- Yorkview – Elementary School

== Geography ==
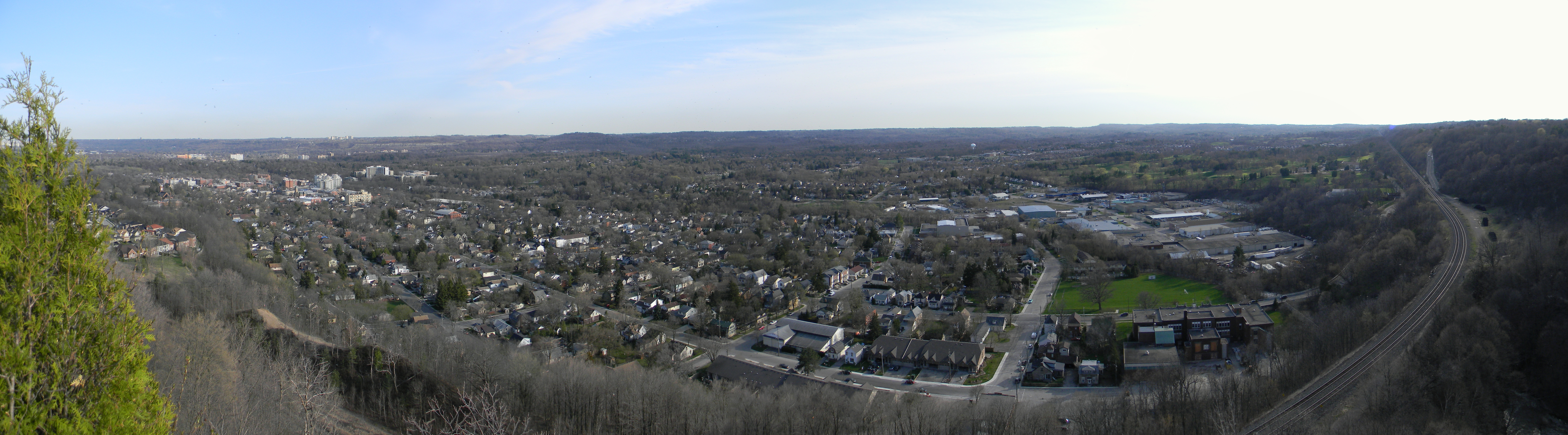
Panoramic view of Dundas, East-West, from the Dundas Peak

=== Waterfalls ===
Dundas is near two commonly visited waterfalls near the district of Flamborough. These are Webster's Falls (named after Joseph Webster) and Tew's Falls. Both waterfalls are accessible by the Bruce trail leading to the Dundas Peninsula.

In 1819, Joseph Webster purchased property on the escarpment above Dundas, including the waterfall, which still bears his family's name. In 1856, his son built a huge stone flour mill just above the falls, but it was destroyed by fire in 1898. After the fire, one of the first hydroelectric generators in Ontario was built at the base of the falls. In 1931, a former Dundas mayor, Colonel W.E.S. Knowles, generously bequeathed monies so that the area surrounding Webster's Falls could be made into a public park.

=== Dundas Peak ===
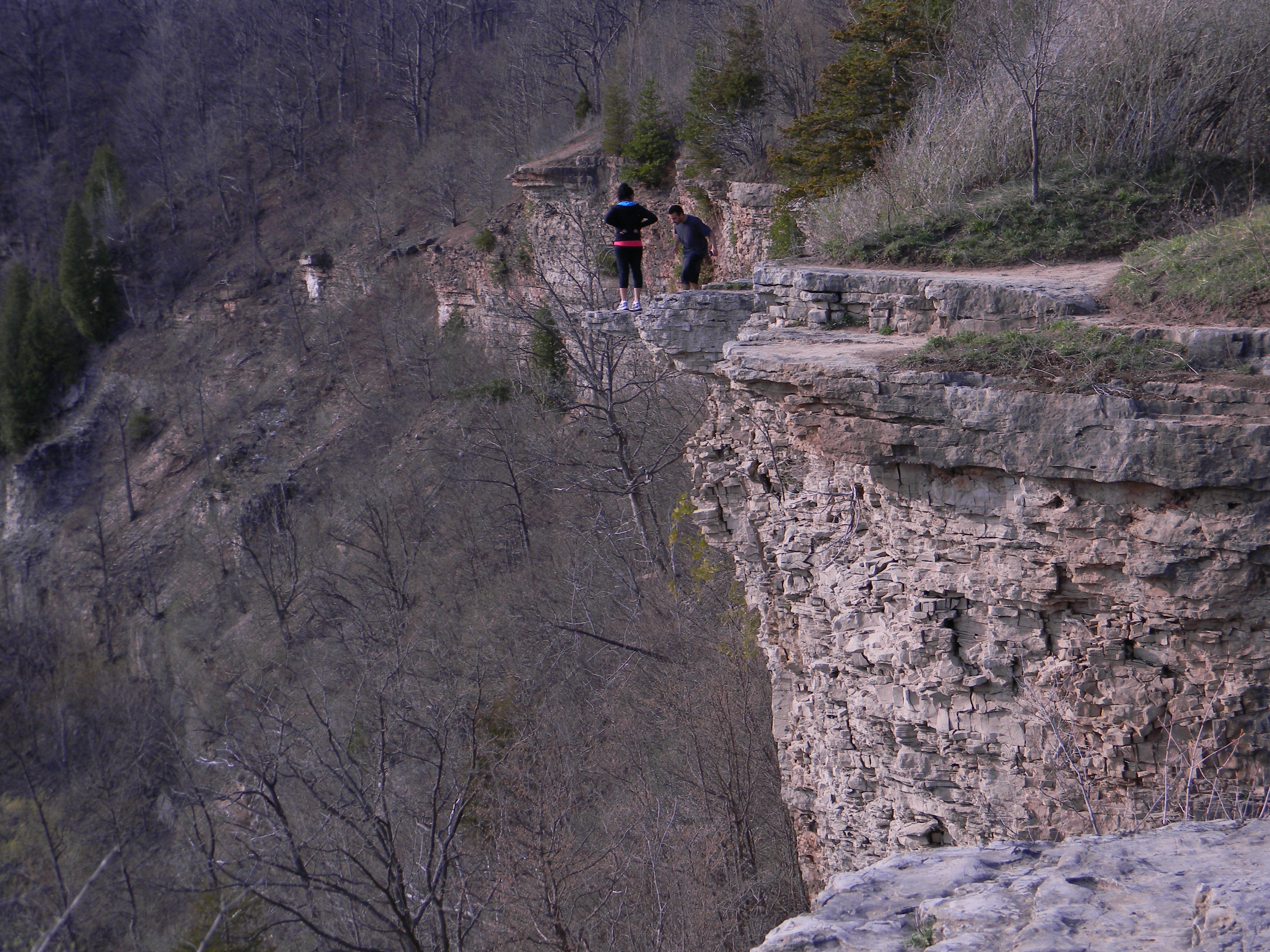
Dundas Peak

Dundas is also near the Dundas Peak, which is also in the Flamborough district. The Peak overlooks Dundas from The Bruce Trail in Flamborough and has become one of the most visited parts of Dundas. Hikers can take the Bruce Trail from Tews or Webster's Falls to the peak and look over Dundas and West Hamilton.

== Landmarks ==
Dundas is famous for the Collins Hotel. After opening in 1841, it has since been the longest-running hotel in Ontario. One feature of the building is a front entrance (portico) with four fluted Doric columns; above them are triglyphs and metopes found on a traditional Doric entablature with a discrete cornice. The roof has a series of dormers with Florentine pediments. There are two floors to the hotel, the second of which has a balcony running the full length of the building. On the street level, there are shops.

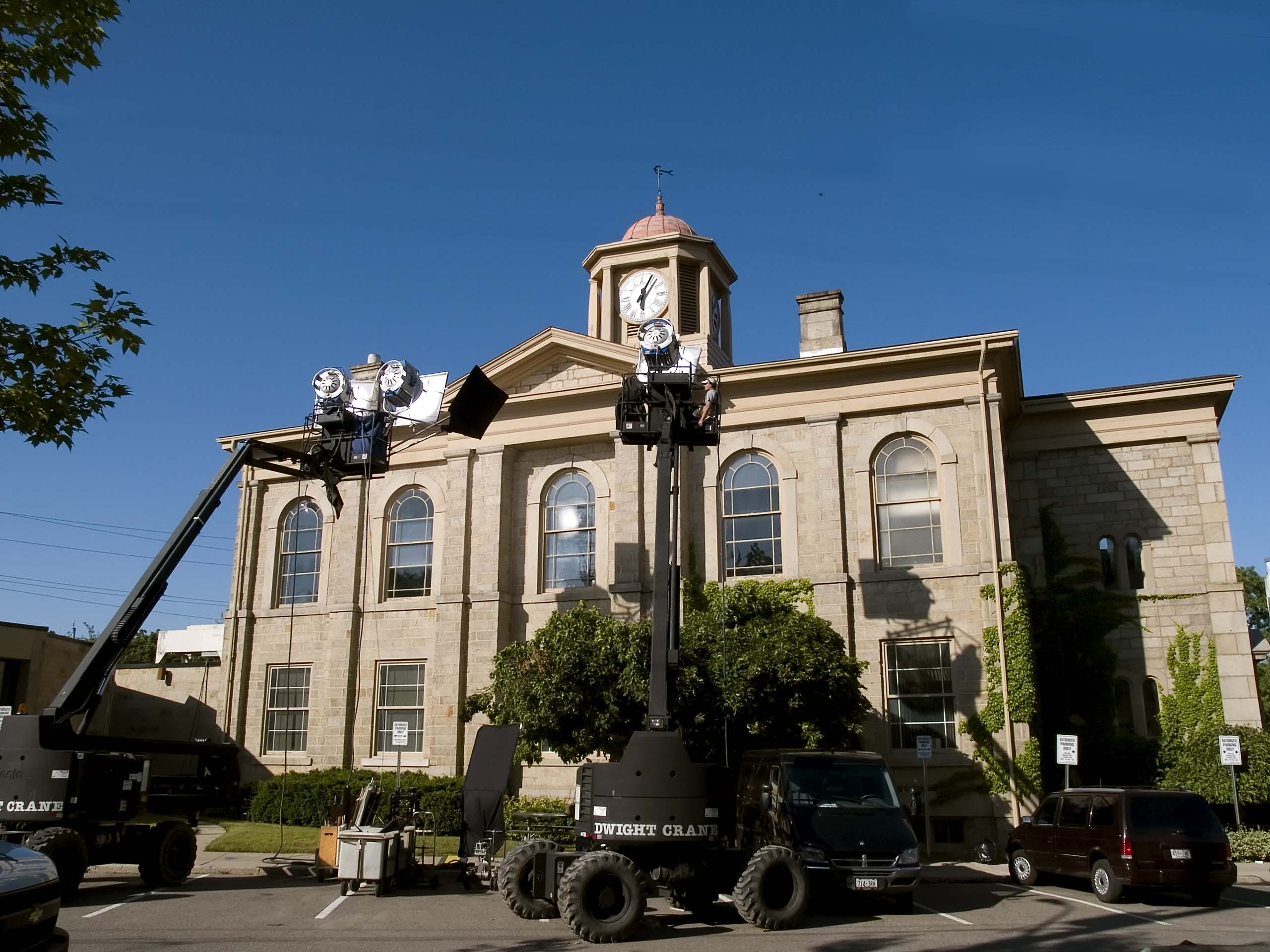
Town Hall during filming, c. 1849

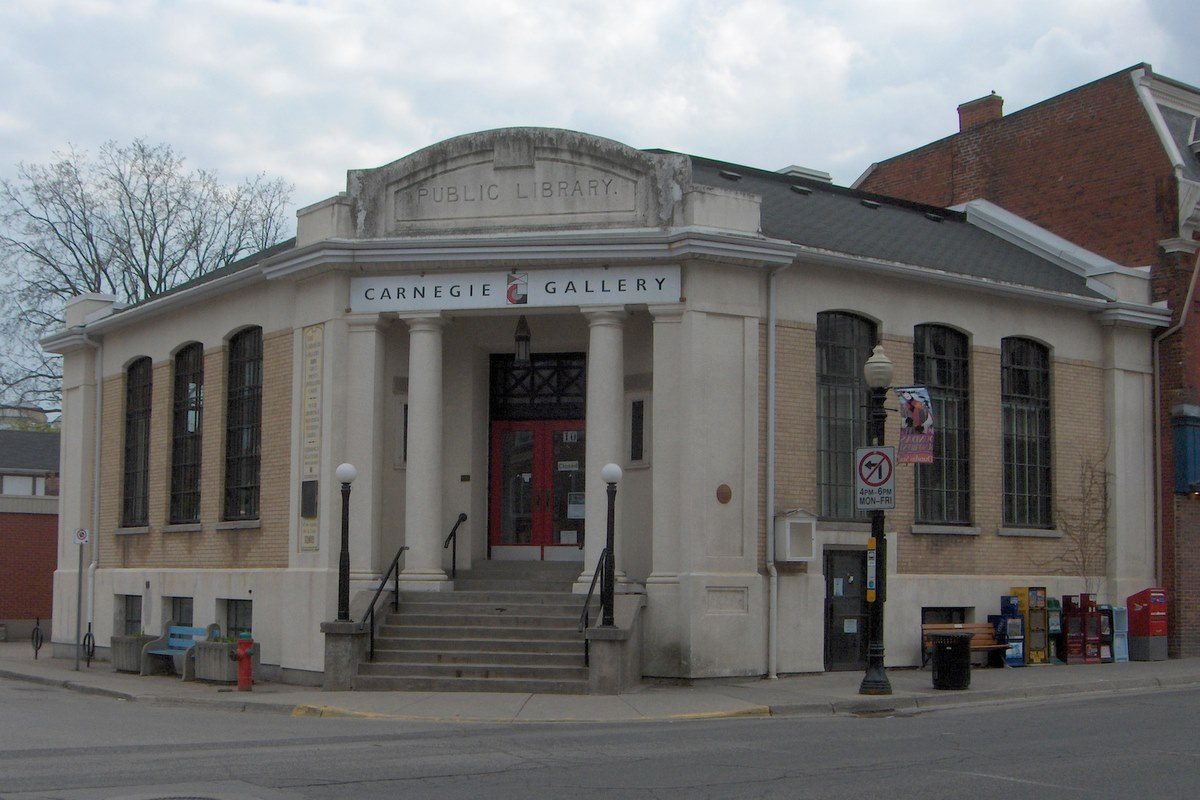
Carnegie Gallery

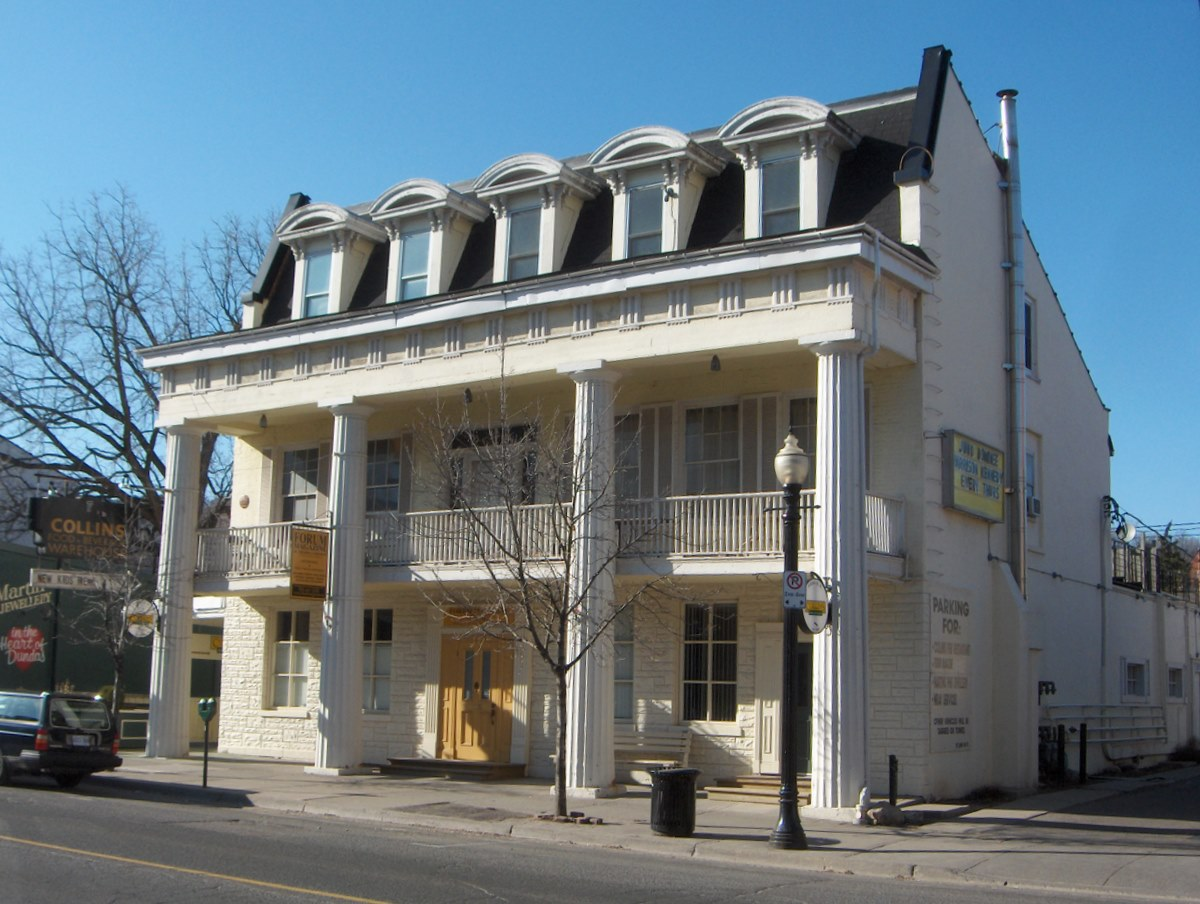
The Collins Hotel, c. 1841

== Notable people ==
- John H. Bryden, novelist
- John Ellison, singer and songwriter who wrote "Some Kind of Wonderful" lives in Dundas.
- Olivia Ferney, social media influencer and travel agent, born and raised in Dundas.
- Mackenzie Hughes, professional golfer raised in Dundas.
- Sarah Galt Elwood McKee, temperance reformer; born in Dundas
- William Osler, Canadian physician was raised in Dundas.
- Stan Rogers, folk singer lived in Dundas; his wife, Ariel, still lives there.
- John Douglas Smith, multiple Emmy Award-winning motion picture sound editor raised in Dundas.
- Daniel V. Snaith, musician also known as "Manitoba" and "Caribou," grew up in Dundas and wrote a song called "Dundas, Ontario."
- Bob Stutt, puppeteer
- Dave Thomas, actor and comedian from SCTV grew up in Dundas.
- Ian Thomas, singer, songwriter, Juno Award winner, actor and author. He is the younger brother of comedian and actor Dave Thomas.
- Don Thomson Jr., race car driver grew up in Dundas. He is a five-time CASCAR Series Champion.
- David Vienneau, journalist, grew up in Dundas.
- Pete Wood, major league pitcher from the 19th century.

== Sister city ==
- Kaga, Ishikawa, Japan
- Otjiwarongo, Namibia

== See also ==
- King Street, Dundas, Ontario
