= Concierge =

Employee of an apartment building, hotel or office building, who receives guests

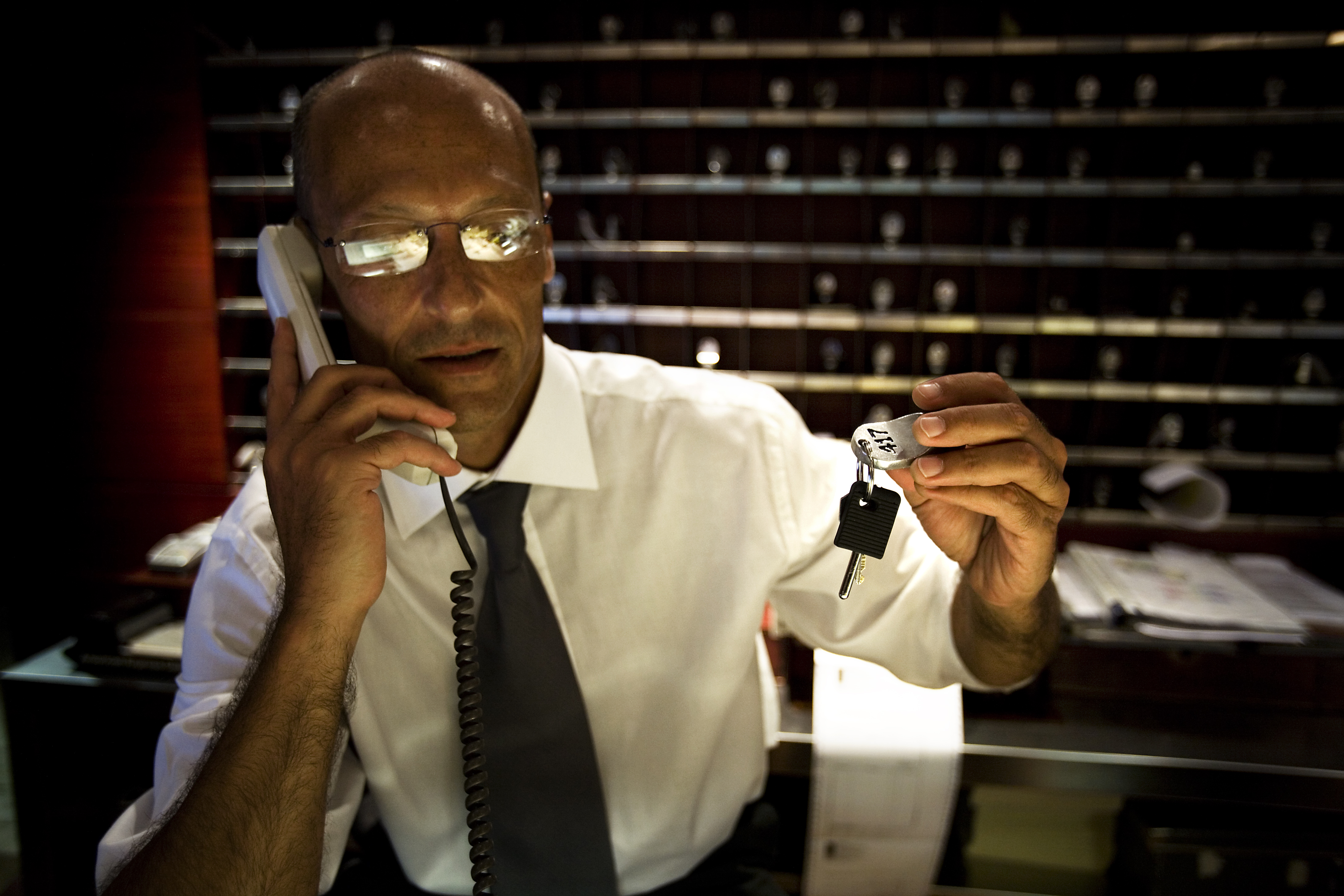
A hotel concierge

A concierge (French pronunciation: [kɔ̃sjɛʁʒ]) is an employee of a multi-tenant building, such as a hotel or apartment building, who receives and helps guests. The concept has been applied more generally to other hospitality settings and to personal concierges who manage the errands of private clients.

== Etymology ==
The French word concierge is likely derived from the Old French cumcerges, itself related to the Medieval Latin consergius or the Latin conservus ("fellow servant or slave").

Another possibility, suggested by French authors as early as the 19th century, is that concierge is a contraction of comte des cierges ("count of candles"), a servant responsible for maintaining the lighting and cleanliness of medieval palaces.

== Duties and functions ==
=== In history ===
In medieval times, the concierge was an officer of the king who was charged with executing justice, with the help of his bailiffs. Initially working as a porter of a castle, under Hugh Capet up to Louis XI, the term was transferred to a high official of the kingdom and - after the castles had lost their defensive function and served as prisons - also to prison guards, appointed by the king to maintain order and oversee the police and prisoner records. This latter use gave the name to the Conciergerie, a palace, courthouse, and prison in Paris.

=== In apartment or office buildings ===
The concierge serves inhabitants and guests of an apartment or office building with duties similar to those of a receptionist. The position can also be maintained by a security guard over the late night shift.

In 19th-century and early 20th-century apartment buildings, particularly in Paris, the concierge was known as a "Suisse", as the post was often filled by Swiss people. They often had a small apartment on the ground floor, called loge, and were able to monitor all comings and goings. However, such settings are now extremely rare; most concierges in small or middle-sized buildings have been replaced by the part-time services of door-staff. Some larger apartment buildings or groups of buildings retain the use of concierges. The concierge may, for instance, keep the mail of absented dwellers, be entrusted with the apartment keys to deal with emergencies when residents are absent, provide information to residents and guests, provide access control, enforce rules, and act as a go-between for residents and management when management is not on-site.

=== In hotels ===
The usual sign for a hotel concierge: Two crossed keys.

A hotel concierge is mainly employed in the luxury hotel industry and is often located near the reception desk with their own counter. While the receptionist deals with check-in, check-out and other hotel-related matters in the narrower sense, the concierge is available to guests as a contact person for other inquiries, such as advice and bookings for excursions, transfers and restaurants. They often have special contacts, acting as a “door opener”. They are at the service of guests who usually have the highest expectations and with whom they sometimes build up a close relationship, especially with regular guests.

The international professional association of hotel concierges is the Union Internationale des Concierges d'Hotels with the distinctive mark Les Clefs d'Or, a kind of insignia in the form of two gold-plated keys crossed over each other, which the concierge wears on their lapel. The association has 4,000 members from 80 countries (2017). Candidates for membership must have at least five years of “hall service” in a luxury hotel and provide a recommendation from at least two people.

=== In hospitals ===
In hospitals, concierge services are becoming increasingly available. A hospital concierge provides similar services to those of a hotel concierge, but serves patients and employees as well. This helps hospital employees who work long shifts and helps to provide work–life balance.

=== Personal concierge ===
A modern concierge may also serve as a lifestyle manager, like a secretary or a personal assistant.

There are numerous independent personal concierge companies that provide errand services and information services for their members. Services include informational requests, setting dinner reservations, making telephone calls, researching travel arrangements and more. Typically, concierge companies will bill on an hourly rate, and depending upon the type of task, fees can vary drastically. Other companies bill a flat monthly fee based upon the number of requests a member is allowed to place each month. In the United Kingdom, since the year 2000 and as of 2010, concierge has become a key marketing and loyalty tool in the banking sector and offered as a benefit on luxury credit cards. This service offering is also known as lifestyle management. Concierges also entertain their clients. Notable concierges include Olivia Ferney.

Additionally, concierge services are now frequently offered as a service by financial institutions to their most valuable clients as way of retaining and attracting clients. Lifestyle and travel concierge companies often offer their service as a white-label or semi-branded product on a business-to-business-to-consumer (B2B2C) basis. Banks who currently offer concierge services to clients include Coutts, China Merchants Bank, RBC, and HSBC.

Airport concierge services help travellers make it through security, customs, and immigration faster, and provide lounge access.

The owners and operators of concierge, lifestyle management, and errand service businesses are supported and advocated by the non-profit International Concierge and Lifestyle Management Association (ICLMA) and the National Concierge Association.

== See also ==
- Concierge medicine
- Doorman
- Property caretaker
- Receptionist
- Duty officer
