= 2026 Cinéfest Sudbury International Film Festival =

2026 film festival in Ontario

- Opening film: Run Terry Run by Sean Menard
- Closing film: The Only Living Pickpocket in New York by Noah Segan
- Location: Sudbury, Ontario, Canada
- Founded: 1989
- Festival date: September 19–27, 2026
- Website: cinefest.com

Cinéfest Sudbury International Film Festival
- 2027 2025

The 2026 edition of the Cinéfest Sudbury International Film Festival, the 38th edition in the event's history, was held from September 19 to 27, 2026 in Sudbury, Ontario. The festival included a new program, Desjardins After Dark, to highlight edgier genre films comparable to the Toronto International Film Festival's Midnight Madness lineup.

The festival poster, based on the theme of "For thinkers and feelers", was designed by Sudbury artist Tony Jurgilas, and released on August 3.

The first programming announcements were released on August 18, with short film programs announced on August 25. The full schedule was announced on August 26.

== Awards ==
Awards in the festival's Best in Shorts competition for local filmmakers were announced on September 26. Audience award winners were announced on September 29, while awards in juried categories were announced on October 1.

Award	Film	Filmmaker
Audience Choice, Feature Film	I Play Rocky	Peter Farrelly
Audience Choice, Feature Film Runner-Up	Women on Trial (L'Affaire Marie-Claire)	Lauriane Escaffre, Yvo Muller
Audience Choice, Documentary	Run Terry Run	Sean Menard
Audience Choice, Documentary Runner Up	Darlene Love: I Know Where I've Been	Barry Avrich
Audience Choice, Short Film	A Wolf in the Suburbs	Amélie Hardy
Audience Choice, Short Film Runner Up	Stewards of the North	Diego Rojas Garcia
Outstanding Canadian Feature	Run Terry Run	Sean Menard
Outstanding International Feature	The Only Living Pickpocket in New York	Noah Segan
Outstanding Female-Led Feature Film	Rehearsals for a Revolution (خاطرات ایران)	Pegah Ahangarani
Cinema Indigenized Outstanding Talent	In Alaska	Jaap van Heusden, Vinnie Karetak
Cinema Indigenized Outstanding Talent	In the Heart of the South	Nyla Innuksuk
French-Language Feature Film	The Money Maker (L'Affaire Bojarski)	Jean-Paul Salomé
Inspiring Voices and Perspectives	Women on Trial (L'Affaire Marie-Claire)	Lauriane Escaffre, Yvo Muller
Outstanding Short Film	Living Grounds (Sol vivant)	Émile Lavoie
Outstanding Animated Short Film	To Our Future Ancestors (À nos futurs ancêtres)	Bogdan Anifrani-Fedach, Ian Keteku
Outstanding Northern Ontario Short Film	The Pomegranate Theory	Eliza Goodwin
CTV Best in Shorts, Open Category First Place	Happy	Kato Alexander, Renjie Li
CTV Best in Shorts, Open Category Second Place	The Fire Spirit	Jake Savard
CTV Best in Shorts, Scholarship	Stick: School Days	Michael Loranger
CTV Best in Shorts, Special Merit	Western Days Gold	Donna Bowles

== Official selections ==
=== Gala Presentations ===
English title	Original title	Director(s)	Production country
Club Kid		Jordan Firstman	United States
Coward		Lukas Dhont	Belgium
The Debut		Jesse Eisenberg	United States
Fjord		Cristian Mungiu	Romania, France, Norway, Sweden, Denmark
I Play Rocky		Peter Farrelly	United States
Last Moon		Brandon D. Cox	Canada
The Only Living Pickpocket in New York		Noah Segan	United States
Run Terry Run		Sean Menard	Canada
The Stunt Driver		Michael Dowse	Canada

=== Special Presentations ===
English title	Original title	Director(s)	Production country
The American Dream	Le Rêve américain	Anthony Marciano	France
Back in Black		Ron Murphy	Canada
Darlene Love: I Know Where I've Been		Barry Avrich	Canada
Foreign Tongue		Boris Mojsovski	Canada
Ha-Chan, Shake Your Booty!		Josef Kubota Wladyka	United States
In Alaska		Jaap van Heusden, Vinnie Karetak	Netherlands, Canada
In the Heart of the South		Nyla Innuksuk	Canada
Ithaqua		Casey Walker	Canada
Just an Illusion	Juste une illusion	Éric Toledano, Olivier Nakache	France
A Long Winter		Andrew Haigh	United States, Canada, United Kingdom
Look Back	ルックバック	Hirokazu Kore-eda	Japan
Love of Your Life		Rachel Morrison	United States
Minotaur	Минотавр	Andrey Zvyagintsev	France, Germany, Latvia
The Money Maker	L'Affaire Bojarski	Jean-Paul Salomé	France
Nina Roza		Geneviève Dulude-De Celles	Canada
Parallel Tales	Histoires Parallèles	Asghar Farhadi	France, United States, Italy, Belgium
So Long Pluto	Au revoir Pluton	Sarianne Cormier	Canada
The Soundman	Radioman	Frank Van Passel	Belgium
Tender Loving Care		Mike Leigh	United Kingdom
Women on Trial	L'Affaire Marie-Claire	Lauriane Escaffre, Yvo Muller	France
Your Mother Your Mother Your Mother		Bassam Tariq	United States

=== Features Canada ===
English title	Original title	Director(s)	Production country
125, rue des Malaises		Louis Bélanger	Canada
L'Autre		Alexandre Franchi	Canada
The Banquet		Gloria Ui Young Kim	Canada
The Betrayers		David Bezmozgis	Canada, Ukraine
Extravagant Ways to Say Goodbye		Liese Kuhn	Canada
François.e		Jean-François Asselin	Canada
The Furies	Les Furies	Mélanie Charbonneau	Canada
Julián		Louise Bagnall	Luxembourg, Ireland, Canada, Denmark
Lydia and the Mist Rider	Lydia et le vaisseau des tempêtes	Émilie Rosas, Philippe Arseneau Bussières, Nancy Florence Savard	Canada
The Mechanics of Borders	La Mécanique des frontières	Hubert Caron-Guay	Canada
My Son Came Back to Disappear	Mon fils ne revint que sept jours	Yan Giroux	Canada
Neverman		Rodrigo Barriuso	Canada
Paradise		Jérémy Comte	Canada
Plan C		Scott Cavalheiro	Canada
Redemptions	Rédemptions	Luc Picard	Canada
Seahorse		Aisha Evelyna	Canada
Someone's Daughter		Wiebke von Carolsfeld	Canada
Sunburn		Serville Poblete	Canada
What We Have Left		Sergio Navarretta	Canada
Whatcha Want		Mina Shum	Canada

=== Cana-Doc ===
English title	Original title	Director(s)	Production country
Faking Filmation		Rob McCallum	Canada
Gimme Truth		Simon Ennis, Brad Abrahams	Canada
Nuisance Bear		Jack Weisman, Gabriela Osio Vanden	Canada, United States
The Sandbox		Kenya-Jade Pinto	Canada
Still Night, Burning House		Carol Nguyen	Canada

=== World Cinema ===
English title	Original title	Director(s)	Production country
Bedford Park		Stephanie Ahn	United States
California Schemin'		James McAvoy	United Kingdom, United States
Double Freedom	La libertad doble	Lisandro Alonso	Chile, Argentina, Luxembourg, Germany, United Kingdom
Everytime		Sandra Wollner	Austria, Germany
La Gradiva		Marine Atlan	France, Italy
The Kidnapping of a President	Presidentin kyyditys	Samuli Valkama	Finland
Soumsoum, The Night of the Stars	Soumsoum, la nuit des astres	Mahamat-Saleh Haroun	Chad, France
The Sun Never Sets		Joe Swanberg	United States
Yellow Letters	Gelbe Briefe	İlker Çatak	Germany, Turkey, France

=== World Doc ===
English title	Original title	Director(s)	Production country
Birds of War		Janay Boulos, Abd Alkader Habak	United Kingdom, Syrian Arab Republic, Lebanon
Replica		Chouwa Liang	Australia, France
When a Witness Recants		Dawn Porter	United States

=== In Full View: Crisis, Conflict, Conscience ===
English title	Original title	Director(s)	Production country
Josephine		Beth de Araújo	United States
Rehearsals for a Revolution	خاطرات ایران	Pegah Ahangarani	Czech Republic, Spain

=== Cinema Indigenized (Nishnaabek Dbaajmawaat) ===
English title	Original title	Director(s)	Production country
Ancestor/Great-Grandparent/Great-Grandchild	Aanikoobijigan	Adam Khalil, Zack Khalil	United States, Denmark
How We Stand		Marie Clements	Canada
Nitassinan		Joséphine Bacon, Kim O'Bomsawin	Canada
Turtle Island Rap		Alexandra Lazarowich	Canada

=== Desjardins After Dark ===
English title	Original title	Director(s)	Production country
Feature films
Gail Daughtry and the Celebrity Sex Pass		David Wain	United States
Jim Queen	Jim Queen à la recherche de la Chloroqueer	Nicolas Athane, Marco Nguyen	France
Ladies and Gentlemen, Brian Mulroney	Mesdames et Messieurs, Brian Mulroney	Matthew Rankin	Canada
Lumi		Jen Walden	Canada
Starsuckers		Brett M. Butler, Jason G. Butler	Canada
Short films
A Bridge Across		Tash Baycroft	Canada
Forward		Michael Naphan	Canada
Halifax Pier		Matthew Daniel Herst	Canada
Haunt Restorer		Wil Andrews	Canada
Hilary's Cover Is Blown		MJ Dionne	Canada
Nightstands		Emily Fraser	Canada
Somnus		Matt Paradis	Canada
The Squirrel Diaries		KJ Carter	Canada
Twenty-Nine		Ra'anaa Yaminah Ekundayo	Canada
Wherever the Wind Blows		Mathieu Séguin	Canada

=== Short Circuit ===
English title	Original title	Director(s)	Production country
As Long As We Are Immortal	Tant que nous sommes immortels	Nora Burlet Dhainaut	Canada
Call to a Restless Sky		Tanner Stevens, Robert Scratch Mitchell, Kelly Hammond	Canada
Combustion		Arielle Legault	Canada
The Flames of Me	Je m'appelle Daniel	Daniel Léger	Canada
From Nine to Ten		Gus Belford, Steve Belford	Canada
Full Circle		Anna Hopkins	Canada
Gamophobia		Mariah Owen	Canada
Good Vibes Only		Sarah D'Ambrosio	Canada
Green Fingers		Farhad Pakdel	Canada
Into the Pool		Scott Ballard	United States
Living Grounds	Sol vivant	Émile Lavoie	Canada
Paradaïz		Matea Radic	Canada
Piluk		Elisapie, Marc Séguin	Canada
The Pomegranate Theory		Eliza Goodwin	Canada
Rotting/Loving U	Pourir/T'aimer	Lou Scamble	Canada
Rumspringa		Miia Piironen	Canada
Sitting Bird		Athena Han	Canada
Stewards of the North		Diego Rojas Garcia	Canada
Swimmers		Ryan Nesbitt	Canada
To Our Future Ancestors	À nos futurs ancêtres	Bogdan Anifrani-Fedach, Ian Keteku	Canada
The Undisputed Princess of Brooklyn		Derek Shane Garcia	United States
Wâwâhtew		Derrek Visentin	Canada
A Wolf in the Suburbs		Amélie Hardy	Canada

=== CTV Best in Shorts ===
The festival's dedicated competition for short films by amateur local filmmakers from Northern Ontario.

English title	Original title	Director(s)	Production country
Achilles		Emerson Geovany Bardales Madrid	Canada
Elderlemma		Nicolas Patrick Robillard	Canada
The Fire Spirit		Jake Savard	Canada
Emily's House		Kat Zhang	Canada
Happy		Kato Alexander, Renjie Li	Canada
Junk		Jackson Brotherton	Canada
Ms. Mary		Alyssa Kostello	Canada
Off Script		Daren Sullivan	Canada
Rumspringa		Miia Piironen	Canada
Stick: School Days		Michael Loranger	Canada
Western Days Gold		Donna Bowles	Canada
