= Kraakman =

Kraakman is a surname. Notable people with the surname include:

- Bernadette Kraakman (born 1959), Dutch singer, professionally known as Bernadette
- Maria Kraakman (born 1975), Dutch actress
