= Guillaume Pitron =

French journalist and documentarian

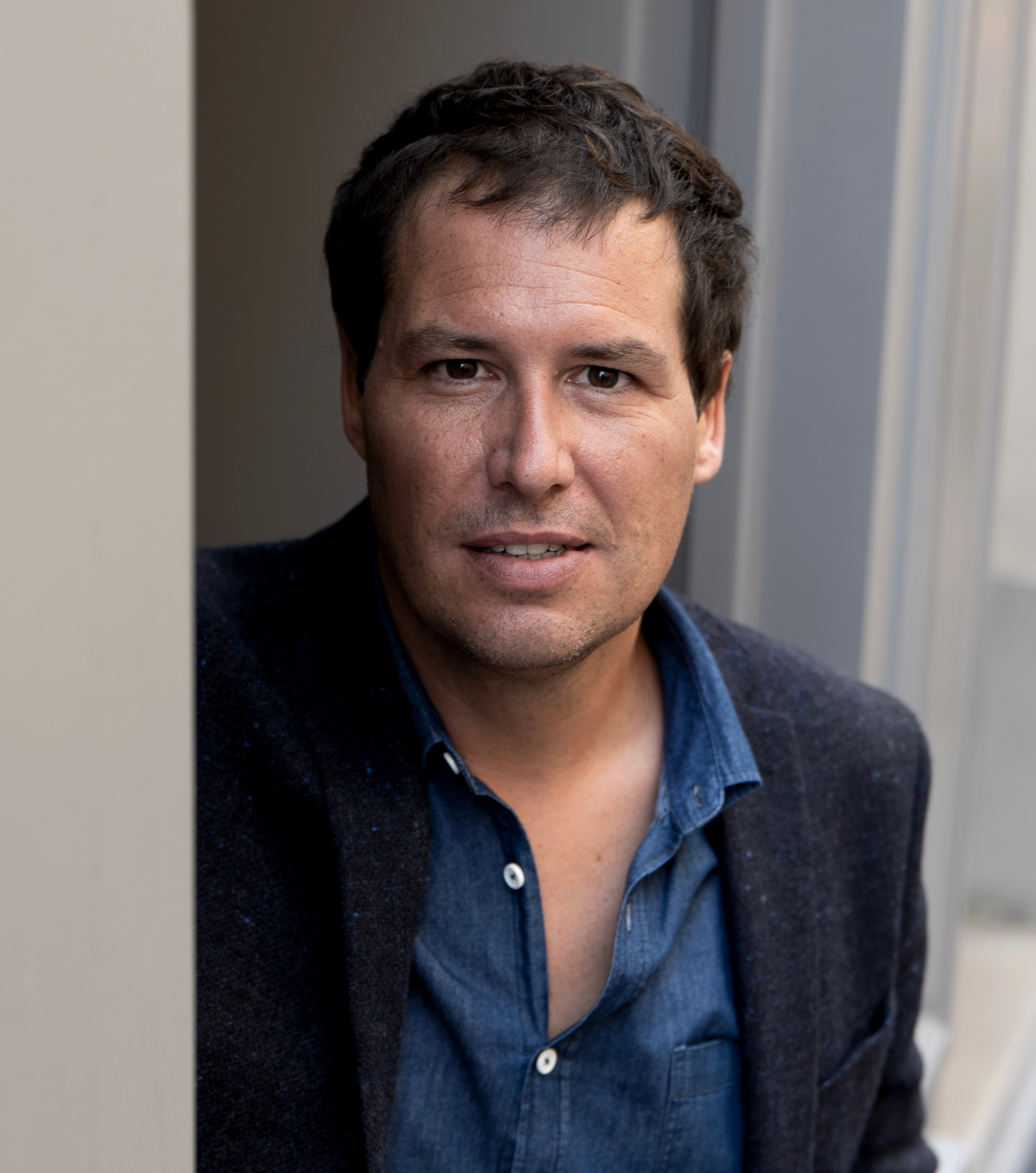
- Notable work: The rare metals war
- Website: https://www.en-guillaumepitron.com/

Guillaume Pitron (born 1980) is a French journalist, author and documentary maker. He specializes in the geopolitics of raw materials.

== Career ==
Guillaume Pitron holds a post-graduate law from the University of Paris and a master's degree in international law from Georgetown University.

He was a lawyer before becoming a journalist for Le Monde diplomatique, Geo, and National Geographic.

He is the director of several documentaries related to the exploitation of raw materials, in particular, "Boomerang: The Dark Side of the Chocolate Bar", "Rare Earth: The Dirty War " and " The Dark Side of Green Energies"

After 6 years of investigation, he published in 2018 a geopolitical book: "The Rare Metals War: The Dark Side of the Energy Transition and Digitalization". His work focuses on economic, political, and environmental issues related to the use of rare metals. He promotes the reopening of mines in France to avoid the export of nuisances to neighbouring countries and continents and to retain responsibility for the consequences of the energy transition.

== Awards ==
- 2017 Erik Izraelewicz Economic Survey Award for its publication on the "Forest Sale" published in Le Monde diplomatique
- 2018 Robertval Media Coup de cœur Award
- 2018 Economy Book Price for "The Rare Metals War: The Dark Side Of the Energy Transition and Digitalization"
- 2019 Turgot Prize for the best financial economics book of the year 2018

== Bibliography ==
- Guillaume Pitron, "The rare metals war: the hidden face of the energy and digital transition", London, Scribe, translation Bianca Jacobsohn, 2020, 288 p. ISBN 978-1-912-85426-4
- Guillaume Pitron, "The Dark Cloud: The Hidden Costs of the Digital World", London, Scribe, translation Bianca Jacobsohn, 2023, 304 p ISBN 978-1-957-36301-1
