= Paul Brothers (sportscaster) =

Canadian television personality

Paul Brothers is a Canadian television broadcaster, who was the anchor on Global News Morning for Global TV Halifax from 2013 to 2026.

He was previously a host and reporter on sports television station theScore. He began in national television on MuchMusic in 2006 as host of the show Going Coastal.

Brothers grew up in Bishop's Falls, Newfoundland and Labrador. He moved to Halifax in 2004 and then to Toronto in 2010. Brothers was the first ever winner of Gillette Drafted: The Search for Canada's Next Sportscaster, beating out over 3,000 hopefuls to gain a one-year contract at theScore and become a spokesperson for Gillette. The other contestants included Sean Menard, who went on to become a noted director of sports documentary films.

After departing Global in 2026 due to staff cutbacks, he joined CBHA-FM, Halifax's CBC Radio One station, as a newsreader.

He is married to curler Jill Brothers (née Mouazar).
