= 299 Queen Street West (film) =

- Film poster
- Directed by: Sean Menard
- Produced by: Sean Menard; Molly Ye
- Edited by: Sean Menard
- Music by: Tom Caffey
- Production company: Sean Menard Productions
- Release date: March 13, 2023 (SXSW)
- Running time: 118 minutes
- Country: Canada
- Language: English

299 Queen Street West is a 2023 Canadian documentary film, directed, produced, and edited by Sean Menard.

The film chronicles the early history of MuchMusic, a music television channel headquartered at 299 Queen Street West in Toronto, Ontario, Canada. The voices of VJs like Rick Campanelli, Sook-Yin Lee, Nam Kiwanuka, Mike Campbell, and George Stroumboulopoulos are featured in the film. Menard said, "I wanted to recreate the experience both for viewers who grew up with it and for those who have no clue what MuchMusic was. I wanted them to be immersed in that channel and the best way to do that is to live in the space and the world of the archives and not cut back and forth to on-camera interviews."

== Release ==
The film premiered at the South by Southwest film festival in March 2023. It later premiered at Roy Thomson Hall in Toronto in September 2023.

It was scheduled to premiere on January 26, 2024 on Crave, owned by Much's current parent company Bell Media. However, its release was indefinitely delayed due to copyright issues involving the music video clips seen in the film.

=== Tour ===
The film toured across Canada in the following cities:

Date	Location	Venue
September 22, 2023	Toronto	Roy Thomson Hall
October 17, 2023	Montreal	Rialto Theatre
October 18, 2023	Saint John	Imperial Theatre
October 24, 2023	Charlottetown	Sobey Family Theatre
October 25, 2023	Halifax	Rebecca Cohn Auditorium
October 28, 2023	Ottawa	ByTowne Cinema
November 1, 2023	Calgary	Jack Singer Concert Hall
November 4, 2023	Hamilton	FirstOntario Concert Hall
November 5, 2023	Windsor	Chrysler Theatre
November 8, 2023	Edmonton	Winspear Centre
November 13, 2023	Regina	Conexus Arts Centre
November 24, 2023	Vancouver	Vancouver Playhouse
November 25, 2023	Victoria	Royal Theatre
November 27, 2023	Winnipeg	Centennial Concert Hall
