= Serge Halimi =

French journalist

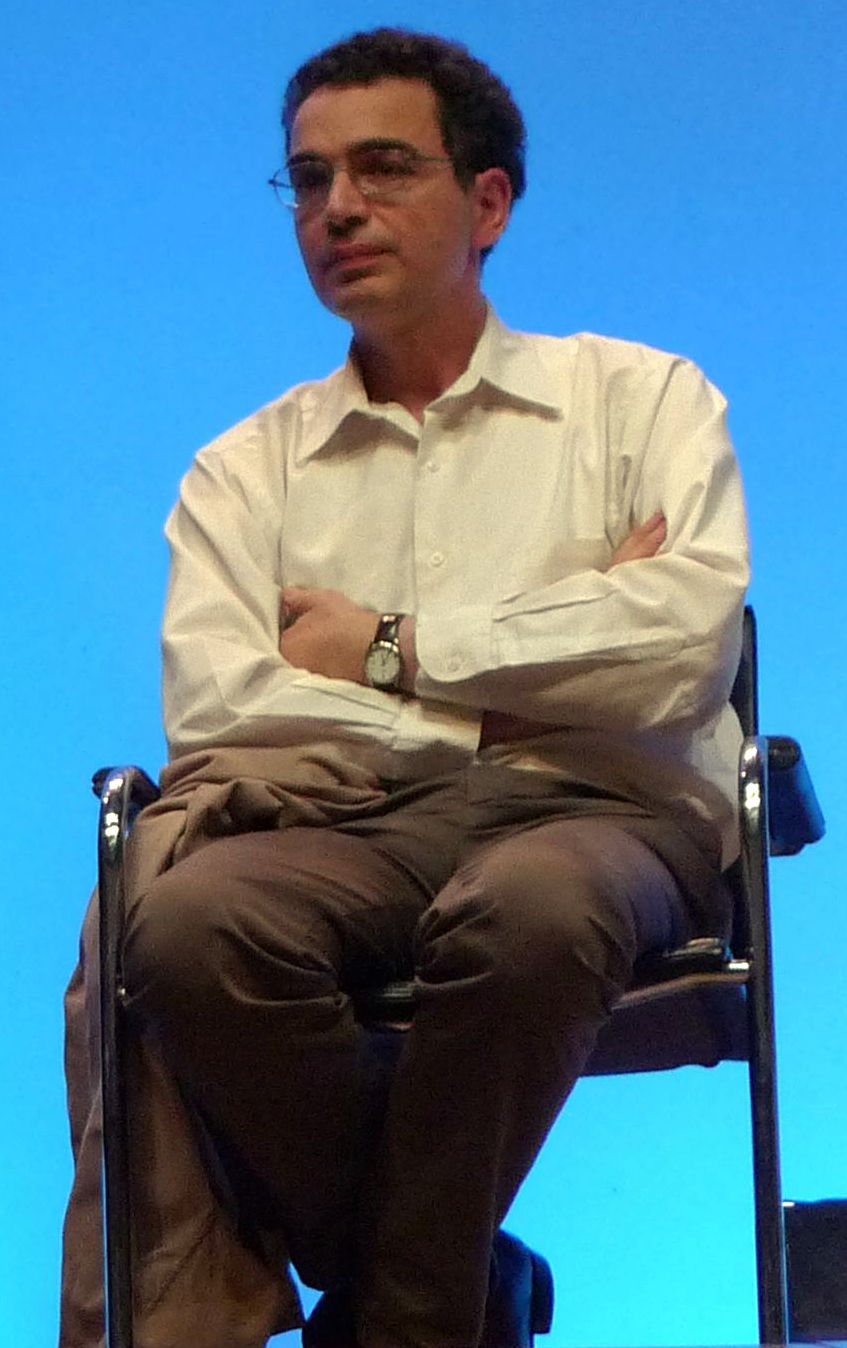
- Serge Halimi, in 2010.
- Born: 2 August 1955 (age 71)
- Education: University of California, Berkeley (PhD)
- Occupation: Journalist
- Known for: Working at Le Monde diplomatique since 1992
- Parent(s): Paul Halimi; Gisèle Halimi

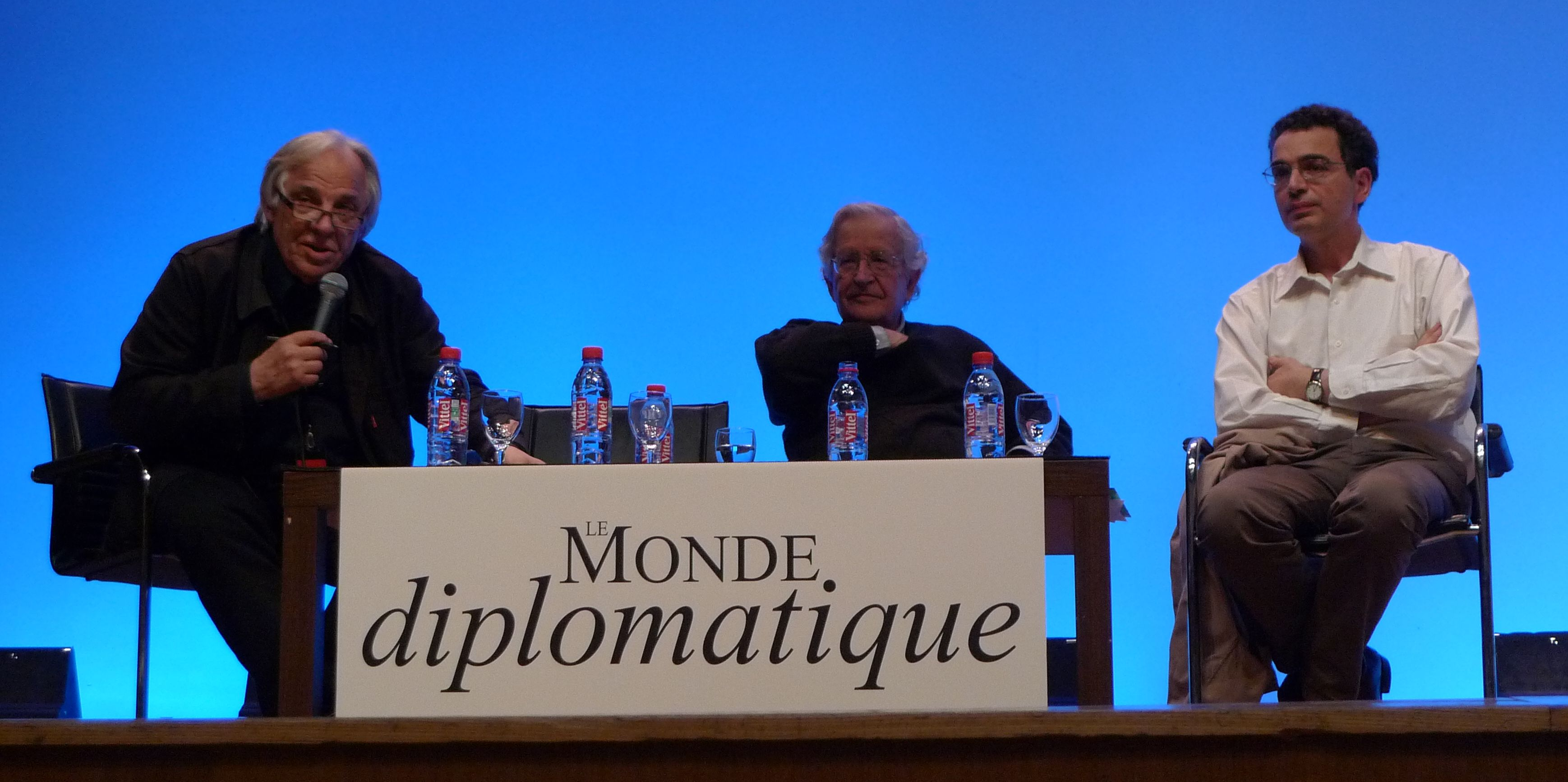
Daniel Mermet, Noam Chomsky and Serge Halimi in Paris (May 2010).

Serge Halimi (born 2 August 1955) is a French journalist working at Le Monde diplomatique since 1992. He served as the newspaper's editorial director from March 2008 through January 2023. He is also the author of Le Grand Bond en Arrière.

== Biography ==
Serge Halimi was elected editorial director of Le Monde diplomatique on 17 December 2007. He assumed the position on 1 March 2008, replacing Ignacio Ramonet. Before that, he served as a journalist at the newspaper.

In 2019, citing decades of American military adventurism dragging NATO nations into wars and President Trump's erratic leadership on Syria, Halimi called for European countries to leave NATO.

== Publications ==
- À l'américaine, faire un président, 1986.
- Sisyphe est fatigué. Les échecs de la gauche au pouvoir, 1993.
- Les Nouveaux Chiens de garde, 1997; updated and enlarged in 2005.
- Quand la gauche essayait, Arléa, 2000.
- L'Opinion, ça se travaille…, Agone, 2000; fifth edition, with Dominique Vidal and Henri Maler, updated and enlarged in 2006, coll. « éléments ».
- Le Grand Bond en arrière, 2004, éditions Fayard (réédité en 2006), Agone, coll. « éléments », 2012.
- Économistes à gages, 2012, Les liens qui libèrent - Le Monde diplomatique, coll. « Prendre parti ».
