= Djamila Boupacha =

Algerian militant (born 1938)

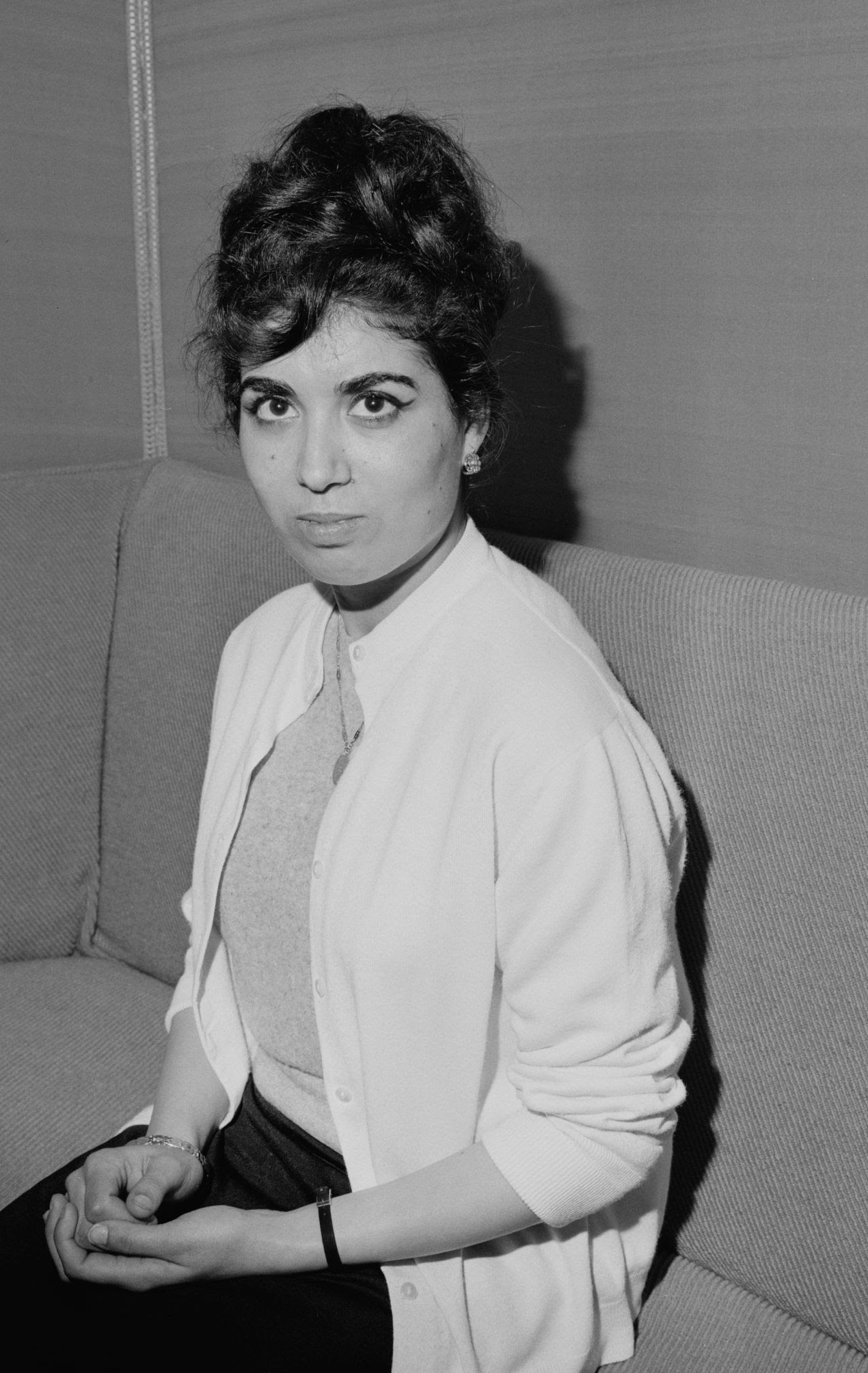
- Boupacha in 1963
- Born: 9 February 1938 (age 88); Saint-Eugène, French Algeria (now Bologhine, Algiers, Algeria)

Djamila Boupacha (Arabic: جميلة بوباشا, born 9 February 1938) is a former militant from the Algerian National Liberation Front. She was arrested in 1960 for attempting to bomb a cafe in Algiers.

Her confession, which was purportedly obtained by means of torture and rape, and her subsequent trial affected French public opinion about the methods used by the French army in Algeria after publicity by Simone de Beauvoir and Gisèle Halimi. Boupacha was sentenced to death on 29 June 1961, but was given amnesty under the Evian Accords and later freed on 21 April 1962.

== Early life ==
Djamila Boupacha was born on 9 February 1938 in Saint-Eugène (now Bologhine), a suburb of Algiers, then part of French Algeria. Her father, Abdelaziz Boupacha, was uneducated but spoke French, while her mother, Zoubida Amarouche, was illiterate and did not speak French.

In her adolescence, Boupacha became involved in Algerian nationalist movements. She joined the Democratic Union of the Algerian Manifesto (UDMA), founded by Ferhat Abbas, in 1953 at the age of 15. Later, she became a member of the National Liberation Front (FLN), the leading nationalist organization during the Algerian War. During the conflict, she operated under the nom de guerre Khelida.

== FLN work, arrest, and torture ==
Early in the Algerian War, Boupacha worked as a trainee at Béni Messous Hospital but was prevented from taking a certificate in training because of her race and religion. This setback played a role in her rejection of the French colonial system in Algeria.

On 10 February 1960, French troops raided Boupacha's household and arrested her, her father and her brother-in-law. She was accused of having planted a bomb—defused by army deminers—at the Brasserie des facultés on 27 September 1959 in Algiers.

The arrestees were taken to a military barracks at El Biar where they were beaten and interrogated. Boupacha was later transferred and reportedly tortured at the prison of Hussein Dey. The torture purportedly included sexual violence, burning her breasts and legs with cigarettes, as well as vaginal rape with an empty beer bottle, as reported by Simone de Beauvoir. Boupacha confessed to planting a bomb at a University restaurant on 27 September 1959. Torture was a common experience for women who were arrested in this conflict, and rape was systematically used to terrorize and shame the Algerian community.

The importance of Boupacha's case lies in her decision to bring a suit against her torturers. Although she did not deny her affiliation with the FLN or her commitment to Algerian independence, she argued that a confession achieved under torture should not be admissible before the military tribunal that was to try her.

== Trial and book publication ==
=== Publication and political implications ===
Working with French Tunisian lawyer Gisèle Halimi, Boupacha brought her torture case to trial, causing a scandal in France and Algeria and gaining wide public attention. Halimi and Simone de Beauvoir wrote a book entitled Djamila Boupacha, with the subtitle 'The Story of the Torture of a Young Algerian Girl which Shocked Liberal French Opinion' as part of a broader plan to "rally public opinion and to put the government on trial for violating Article 344 of the French Penal Code".

Throughout the trial, Boupacha also gained the support of prominent artists and intellectuals such as Henri Alleg, André Philip, and Pablo Picasso. Publicizing the French use of torture was particularly damning given that "France had signed three international documents condemning torture" and, consequently, "De Gaulle repeatedly denied that torture was still used in Algeria." Boupacha's suit, along with a 1960 article by Beauvoir in Le Monde, sought to publicise the claims of unlawful torture during the Algerian War.

Boupacha's violated virginity and her physical and metaphorical purity came under intense scrutiny in the court case as well as in the media. The army's practices of sexual humiliation were already known to the public, but her case shed light on how far the army would go to protect her torturers from prosecution.

Despite being asked by Le Monde to remove the statement that Boupacha had been a virgin prior to her capture, Beauvoir kept it in her article, causing Judith Surkish to explain that although "Beauvoir denounced the fetishization of virginity as the product of paternalistic ethics, here she nonetheless mobilised that figure for the sake of political argument".

Consequently, Natalya Vince claimed Boupacha and other female FLN fighters had their "bodies and sexualities…on display for public consumption." Julien Murphy states that "in her memoir, Beauvoir minimized the political content and impact" of her 1960 writing, portraying it as simply Djamila's story, whereas it "was actually a scathing indictment of the Army."

In addition to the facts of the case, Beauvoir interrogated the notion of “French Algeria" —asking what the phrase would mean if the laws of France were set aside by the army” The article also questioned government control of the army, saying "Such an abdication of responsibility would be a betrayal of France as a whole, of you, of me, of each and every one of us." Beauvoir further implicated all citizens in the torture of Algerians such as Boupacha, writing that “every citizen thereby becomes a member of a collectively criminal nation.” Boupacha thus became a figure at the center of "political engagement" and "public opinion". French officials in Algeria also hindered Boupacha's access to legal representation, denying Halimi's visas to Algeria for Boupacha's court dates. Through the book, Boupacha and her supporters attempted to publicize these actions and garner support to delay the trial in order to allow her more time for preparation and visas.

The government "seized and destroyed" copies of the issue of Le Monde containing Beauvoir's article in Algiers. The book itself, published in 1962, not only describes Boupacha’s story yet also serves as a "historical record" and Beauvoir's "most explicit act of support for decolonization of Algeria". The book insisted "that revulsion at Boupacha's torture must lead to political action."

More generally, scholars such as Maria Vendetti argue that the text Djamila Boupacha "brings the act of torture into public discourse…despite the strong preference for denial and inattention." However, the accords which ended the War for Independence and freed Boupacha also provided the Army with immunity.

=== Boupacha Committee ===
The Djamila Boupacha Committee was a continuation of Beauvoir and Halimi's efforts and instrumental in drumming up public outrage. The Committee campaigned to remove the case from Algerian jurisdiction; this campaign was successful, and the case was transferred to France in December 1960. More generally, the Committee worked to free Boupacha and pressure "the government to publicly punish Boupacha's torturers, an ambitious goal since corruption and abuse regarding the practices of torturing prisoners by the French was abetted at the highest levels."

=== Contents of book ===
Djamila Boupacha includes an introduction by Beauvoir followed by a section by Halimi focusing on Boupacha’s biography and the legal case, and finally statements by “engaged intellectuals” such as Henri Alleg, Jules Roy, and Françoise Sagan.

In 1958, Henri Alleg authored a text entitled La Question, thereby connecting Boupacha to male torture victims in Algeria and corroborating and legitimizing her statement further.

=== Boupacha’s reaction ===
Boupacha originally said that she had “never been able to read” the book titled with her own name. However, in a 2005 interview she explained that she decided to read it before an interview about fifteen years previously in order to remind herself of the dates of various events so she “‘wouldn’t say anything silly.’ Yet in doing so, she ‘felt like I was being strangled.’”

== Later life and legacy ==
=== Post-war activities ===
After the Evian Accords, the end of the War, and the resulting Algerian independence from France, Boupacha worked in the Office for Women’s Employment. In discussing her work during this period, she mentions that she tried to lead illiterate women into trade jobs such as becoming a seamstress rather than returning to an “old colonial role for ‘indigenous women’” of being domestic cleaners. As for more educated women, she explains that she helped them “into accounting, into secretarial roles.”

=== Political involvement, status as national symbol ===
In post-independence Algeria, Boupacha remained a notable individual. The FLN used her as a symbol to support their claim to legitimacy as a one-party state.

For example, in March 1963, Boupacha was one of only four individuals in the “first official delegation to Britain since Algerian independence, the guests of Queen Elizabeth.”

At the time, Alger républicain wrote that Boupacha was "particularly interested in women’s organisations, whilst the men participating in this delegation have expressed a particular interest in visiting the different industrial sectors in Britain." In 2005, Boupacha told an interviewer that she was selected for this delegation only because “they needed a woman,” more to improve Algeria’s public image and “fulfill a gendered role” than to engage in serious politics. She participated because “she felt that she had a responsibility to serve", the same reason she acquiesced more generally to being a "symbol of Algeria as part of her contribution to the nationalist struggle".

She cited the countless other women who worked towards independence but were not recognized for their efforts, saying "there are many other women who suffered more than we did and we don’t know them". She served more as a symbol than a real person for Simone de Beauvoir as well, according to Halimi, who "complained that Beauvoir was more concerned about the cause than she was about Boupacha herself".

In Algiers in 1963, Boupacha visited the new Fatma N’Soumer Centre for Daughters of Shuhada with Nasser, contributing to an image that positioned the women who fought with the FLN guerillas during the war as "direct descendants of the anti-colonial struggle which had begun in the nineteenth century" and portraying "the young girls in the orphanage as representing the future of the struggle for freedom, equality and pan-Arab unity." Boupacha frequently spoke with schoolchildren, generally preferring to emphasize "civic responsibility".

The Museum of the Army in Algiers contains official commemorative oil paintings of Boupacha and other female FLN members, painted from photographs approximately from the war period.

In the 2000s, Boupacha inspired a song called "Djamila" that was composed by Bernard Joyet and sung by Francesca Solleville. Her legacy also lives on in popular culture through Picasso's artwork inspired by her. Composer Luigi Nono wrote "Djamila Boupachà" in 1962, part of his Canti di vita e d'amore.

On 8 March 2023, France paid tribute to the memory of Gisèle Halimi during a national ceremony. President Emmanuel Macron recalled the acts of humiliation, torture, and rape inflicted by the French army upon Boupacha during the Algerian War.
