= Maria Kraakman =

Dutch actress (born 1975)

- Born: 5 August 1975 (age 51); Soest, Netherlands
- Occupation: Actress
- Years active: 2001 – present
- Awards: Golden Calf for Best Actress, Theo d'Or

Maria Kraakman (born 5 August 1975) is a Dutch actress. She has been awarded the Golden Calf for Best Actress at the Netherlands Film Festival in 2005 and 2018, and the Theo d'Or theatre award for best leading actress in 2010 as well as for the most impressive acting performance in a leading role in 2024.

== Career ==
Kraakman has played roles in various Dutch films, including 06/05 (2004), My Queen Karo (2009) and Schneider vs. Bax (2015). She won the Dutch Golden Calf for Best Actress award twice: for her role in the 2005 film Guernsey by Nanouk Leopold and for the 2017 film In Blue by Jaap van Heusden.

Kraakman has performed on stage with Toneelgroep Oostpool in Arnhem and has been a cast member at Internationaal Theater Amsterdam (ITA) since 2017. During the ITA's 2023/24 season, Kraakman gave 30 performances of Suzie Miller's one-woman play Prima Facie, which also included a small tour across the Netherlands. The role garnered Kraakman the 2024 Theo d'Or theatre award for the most impressive acting performance in a leading role. She had previously been awarded a Theo d'Or for her performance in the Dutch stage adaptation of Virginia Woolf's Orlando in 2010.

In 2025, Kraakman will reprise her role in Prima Facie at the ITA, with 13 performances scheduled for February and March. During the ITA's 2024/25 season, she will also perform the role of Rogier Hartman in the Dutch adaptation of Robert Icke's The Doctor and the role of Prothoe in Heinrich von Kleist's Penthesilea.

In April 2021, Kraakman gave her directorial debut in the ITA's production of Cliënt E. Busken, a monologue based on Jeroen Brouwers' novel of the same name. It was revived in the 2024/25 season at the ITA, with Kraakman returning as director.

== Awards ==
Kraakman has received several awards throughout her career.

=== Film ===
- 2005: Golden Calf for Best Actress (won), Guernsey (2005)
- 2010: Ensor for Best Supporting Actress (nominated), My Queen Karo (2009)
- 2010: Golden Calf for Best Actress (nominated), Hunting & Zn. (2010)
- 2015: Golden Calf for Best Actress (nominated), Schneider vs. Bax (2015)
- 2018: Golden Calf for Best Actress (won), In Blue (2017)

=== Theatre ===
- 2009: Gouden Kniertje (won), Anoniem, Productiehuis Rotterdam
- 2010: Theo d'Or (won), Orlando, Toneelgroep Oostpool
- 2016: Theo d'Or (nominated), Het jaar van de kreeft, Toneelgroep Amsterdam
- 2024: Theo d'Or (won), Prima Facie, Internationaal Theater Amsterdam
