= Gisèle Halimi =

Tunisian-French lawyer and politician (1927–2020)

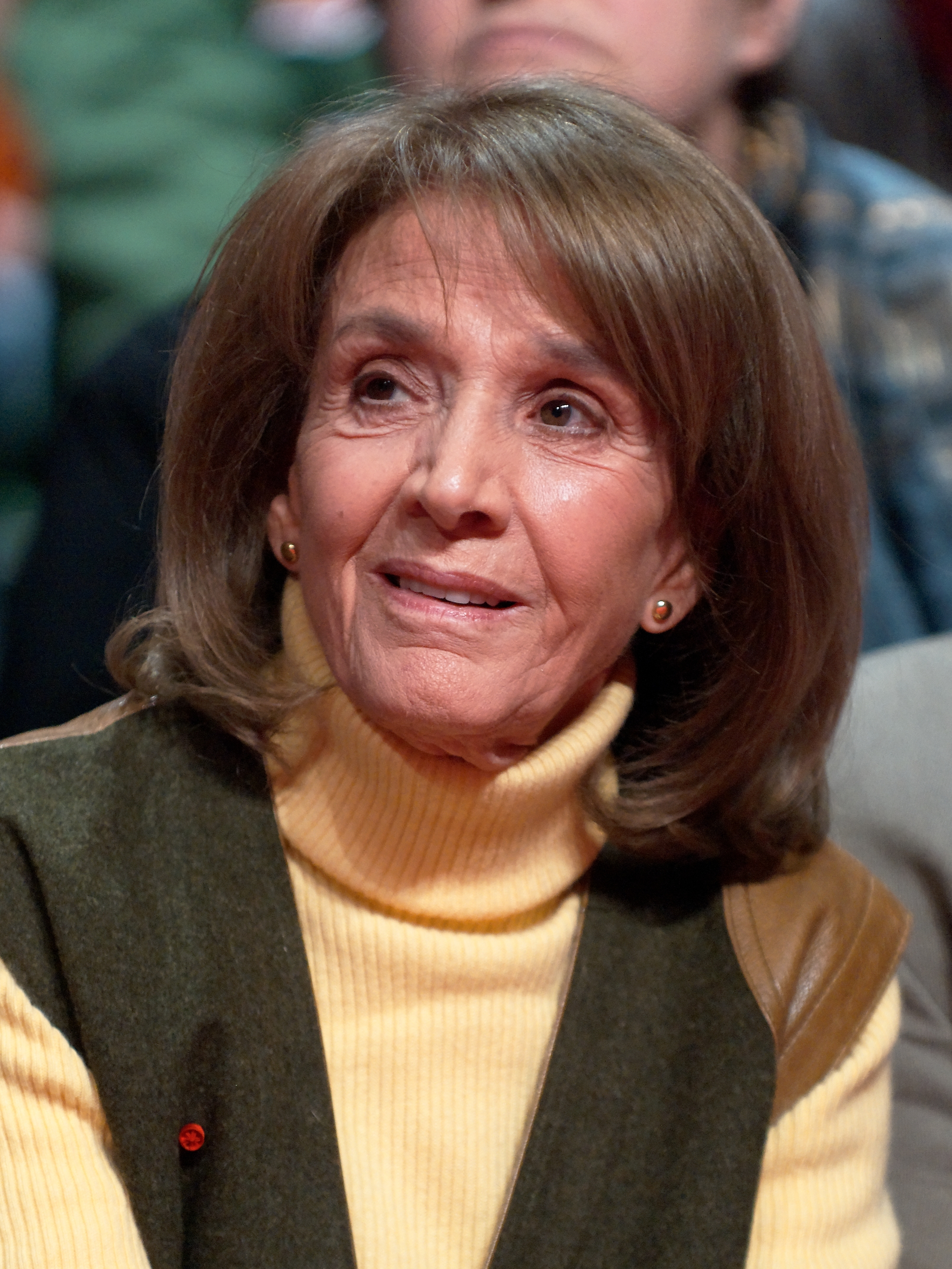
- Halimi in 2009

Permanent Representative of France to UNESCO
- In office 13 April 1985 – 1 September 1986
- President: François Mitterrand
- Preceded by: Jacqueline Baudrier
- Succeeded by: Marie-Claude Cabana

Member of the National Assembly for Isère's 4th constituency
- In office 21 June 1981 – 9 September 1984
- Preceded by: Jacques-Antoine Gaur
- Succeeded by: Maurice Rival

Personal details
- Born: Zeiza Gisèle Élise Taïeb; 27 July 1927 La Goulette, Tunis, French Tunisia
- Died: 28 July 2020 (aged 93) Paris, France
- Spouse(s): Paul Halimi (divorced); Claude Faux
- Children: 3 (including Serge Halimi)
- Education: University of Paris; Sciences Po
- Profession: Lawyer
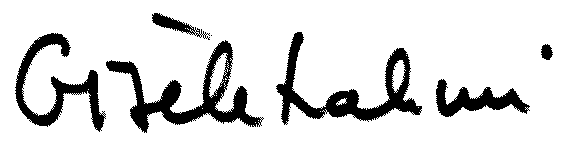
- Signature

Gisèle Halimi (born Zeiza Gisèle Élise Taïeb, Arabic: زايزا جيزيل إليز طيب; 27 July 1927 – 28 July 2020) was a Tunisian-French lawyer, politician, essayist and feminist activist.

As a lawyer, she defended activists fighting for the Algerian nationalism, then a French colony, from the 1950s onwards, including members of the National Liberation Front (Algeria) (FLN). From 1960 onwards, she defended the activist and militant Djamila Boupacha, who was accused of attempted murder and then survived torture and rape while being detained by French soldiers. Alongside Simone de Beauvoir, she publicized the trial in order to highlight the French army's methods of torture during the Algerian War.

A leading figure in French feminism, she was the only lawyer to sign the 1971 Manifesto of the 343, which brought together women who declared that they had had abortions and demanded free access to abortion, which was then illegal in France. In the wake of this, she founded the Choisir la cause des femmes (Choose Women's Cause) movement, alongside Simone de Beauvoir and Jean Rostand, among others. In 1972, during the Bobigny trial, her work as a lawyer for women accused of illegal abortion led to the acquittal of three of the defendants and a suspended sentence for the fourth, and contributed to the evolution towards the Veil Act, named for Simone Veil, on voluntary termination of pregnancy in 1975.

Similarly, her high-profile strategy for two young women who were victims of a gang rape in 1974, tried in 1978, Anne Tonglet and Araceli Castellano, contributed to the adoption of a new law in 1980, clearly defining indecent assault and rape, allowing the latter to be recognized as a crime, whereas until then it had most often been treated as a misdemeanor under French law.

In 1981, Halimi was elected to the French National Assembly, as an independent Socialist and served as Deputy for Isère until 1984. Between 1985 and 1987, she was a French legate to UNESCO. In 1998, she was a founding member of ATTAC.

== Biography ==
Zeiza Gisèle Élise Taïeb was born in La Goulette, French Tunisia, on 27 July 1927 to a practicing Jewish Berber family. Her father, Edouard Taïeb, began as a courier in a law office before becoming a notary clerk and then a legal expert. He was naturalized as a French citizen in 1928. Her mother, Fortunée "Fritna" Mettoudi, conformed to society's expectations of traditional womanhood, which Halimi cited as the reason for her own early feminist engagement. When Gisèle was born, her parents hid her birth for fifteen days because at that time giving birth to a daughter was perceived as a curse. At 12 years old, she refused to wait on her brothers and went on a hunger strike to protest the gender roles enforced by her family. At 15, she refused to marry a rich oil merchant much older than herself.

She was educated at a French lycée in Tunis, then attended the University of Paris, graduating in law and philosophy. She had three sons: Serge, a journalist, and Jean-Yves, a lawyer, from her first marriage to Paul Halimi, and Emmanuel Faux, a journalist, from her second marriage to Claude Faux. She died the day following her 93rd birthday, on July 28, 2020.

== Career ==
In 1948, Halimi qualified as a lawyer and, after eight years at the Tunis bar, moved to practise at the Paris bar in 1956. She acted as a counsel for the Algerian National Liberation Front, most notably for the activist Djamila Boupacha, who had been raped and tortured by French soldiers, writing a book in 1961 (with an introduction by Simone de Beauvoir) to plead her case. Gisèle Halimi was unable to attend the first trial scheduled before the military court and therefore had to delegate one of her correspondents in Algeria, Pierre Garrigues, who was assassinated in Algiers on March 1, 1962. Faced with legal obstacles, she filed a complaint against General Ailleret, commander-in-chief of the armed forces in Algeria, and Pierre Messmer, Minister of the Armed Forces, for violating her client's constitutional rights. The two senior officials were charged with treachery, which brought the case to the attention of the media. She also obtained a change of venue for the trial to Caen and mobilized her networks to form a defense committee that raised the necessary funds to finance the repatriation to France. This trial was notably defended in the French newspaper Le Monde.

She also defended Basque individuals accused of crimes committed during the conflict in Basque Country.

Halimi served as counsel in many cases related to women's issues. She was the only lawyer to sign the 1971 manifesto of 343 women who declared that they had had abortions and demanded free access to contraception and abortion. Alongside Simone de Beauvoir and Jean Rostand, among others, she founded the feminist movement Choisir la cause des femmes (Choose the Cause of Women) in 1971 and campaigned for the decriminalization of abortion. to protect the women who had signed the Manifesto of the 343 admitting to having had illegal abortions, of whom she was one. Her primary goal was to defend the signatories of the manifesto of the 343 who could be charged, and beyond that, to fight for the revision of the 1920 law prohibiting women from controlling their fertility through contraception or abortion. She assumed the presidency of this association upon the death of Simone de Beauvoir.

During the Bobigny trial in 1972, which had a considerable impact, she first obtained the court's acquittal for Marie-Claire Chevalier, a 16-year-old girl who had an abortion after being raped, a suspended sentence for the mother, and acquittal for the two friends who had helped Marie-Claire. She used this trial as a platform to speak out against the law criminalizing abortion. This trial contributed to the evolution towards the Veil Act on voluntary termination of pregnancy, passed in December 1974 and promulgated in January 1975.

Close to François Mitterrand, she was elected to parliament in the 1981 legislative elections, a position she held until 1984. An activist for gender parity in politics, in 1982 she secured the passage of a law authorizing gender quotas in elections, but the text was overturned by the Constitutional Council (France). Alongside Robert Badinter, she was behind the law repealing the distinction between the age of consent for heterosexual and homosexual relations.

From 1985 onwards, she held several successive positions at UNESCO (French ambassador, chair of the Committee on Conventions and Recommendations) and then at the United Nations (special advisor to the French delegation to the General Assembly, rapporteur for gender equality in political life).

In 1998, she was a founding member of the anti-globalization association Association for the Taxation of Financial Transactions and for Citizens' Action (ATTAC).

In 2008, she published an essay with the association Choisir entitled La clause de l'Européenne la plus favorisée (The Most Favored European Clause), which proposes extending the most favorable provisions in each area of women's rights to all citizens of every member country of the European Union. In 2009, she was a member of the sponsorship committee for the Russell Tribunal on Palestine.

== Honors ==
Honorary member of the Order of Lawyers of Mexico in 1982.

Personality of the Year Award from the Grand Jury of International Distinction in 1983.

Minerva Award from the Club delle Donne, in the "Field of Politics and Social Engagement" section (Rome, October 1985).

Medal of the Paris Bar Association (April 2003).

In 2021, an online petition signed by 35,000 people asked that Giséle Halimi be honoured by being reburied at the Panthéon in Paris or be granted Panthéon honours, alongside Simone Veil, Geneviève de Gaulle-Anthonioz, Marie Curie, Germaine Tillion, Sophie Berthelot and also Josephine Baker.

On 26 July 2024, a statute of Gisèle Halimi was among the ten statutes of women at the 2024 Summer Olympics opening ceremony in Paris, with the philosopher and poet Christine de Pizan, the explorer Jeanne Barret, the revolutionary Olympe de Gouges, the anarchist Louise Michel, the film director Alice Guy, the athlete Alice Milliat, the writer Paulette Nardal, the philosopher Simone de Beauvoir and the politician Simone Veil.

She was portrayed by Charlotte Gainsbourg in the 2026 drama film Women on Trial (L'Affaire Marie-Claire).

== Works ==
Title	English translation	Time of first publication	First edition publisher/publication	Unique identifier	Notes
Djamila Boupacha		1962	Gallimard	ISBN 978-2070205240	
Le procès de Burgos	The Burgos Trials	1971		ISBN 978-2070279487	
La cause des femmes	The Cause of Women	1973		ISBN 2-246-00028-9	
Avortement, une loi en procès	Abortion, a Law on Trial	1973		ISBN 2-246-00028-9	
The Right to Choose		1977		ISBN 0-7022-1433-7	
Viol, Le procès d'Aix: Choisir la cause des femmes	Rape, the Aix Trial: Choosing the Cause of Women	1978		ISBN 978-2070353989	
Le Programme commun des femmes	The Common Women's Program	1978		ISBN 2-246-00572-8	
le Lait de l'Oranger	Milk for the Orange Tree	1988		ISBN 0-7043-2738-4	
Une embellie perdue	A Lost Beauty	1995		ISBN 2-07-073788-8	
La nouvelle cause des femmes	The New Cause of Women	1997		ISBN 2-02-031973-X	
Fritna		1999		ISBN 2-259-19134-7	
La parité dans la vie politique	Parity in Political Life	1999		ISBN 2-11-004376-8	
Avocate irrespectueuse	Disrespectful Counsel	2002		ISBN 2-259-19453-2	
Le procès de Bobigny: Choisir la cause des femmes	The Bobigny Trial: Choosing the Cause of Women	2006		ISBN 2-07-077515-1	Preface by Simone de Beauvoir
La Kahina		2006		ISBN 2-259-20314-0	
Ne vous résignez jamais	Never Resign Yourself	2009		ISBN 978-2-259-20941-0	
Histoire d'une passion	History of a Passion	2011	Plon	ISBN 2-259-21394-4	
Une farouche liberté		2020	Grasset	ISBN 978-2-253-07840-1	With Annick Cojean
