= If the Poet =

Canadian poet

Ian French is a Canadian Spoken Word Artist and poet that goes by the handle IF THE POET, or, IF. Among his championships he was Canadian champion in 2014, and placed third in the 2015 world championship. French was the focus of the 2015 documentary film IF the Poet.

== Slam poetry ==
After developing his own business, French discovered spoken word at age 50, and decided to try performing, first appearing on stage at the Drake Hotel in Toronto. His poems, usually with an optimistic and spiritual bend, focused on his youth, growing up with ADHD, run-ins with the law and other forms of trouble, and his later life as a husband and father.

French began to compete as a slam poet competitively under the tutelage of Canadian World Slam Poetry Champion Ian Keteku. In 2013 he became a member of the National Championship Toronto Slam Team, held that year in Montreal. That year he was also the winner of the Buffalo International Slam.

In 2014 he was the winner of the Canadian Individual Poetry Slam Championship held in Vancouver. He placed third that year at the World Cup of Slam Poetry, held that year in Paris, France. He has also performed at festivals including Word On The Street and Words Aloud, as well as locally in southern Ontario. He currently resides in Toronto and Bracebridge, Ontario.

== Media ==
He was the focus of the 2015 CBC Television documentary IF the Poet.

== Personal life ==
French lives with Lise St-Arnaud in Toronto.
