= Qanurli =

Comedy series

Qanurli is a comedy series broadcast on the Canadian Aboriginal Peoples Television Network. The show revolves around Inuk Qablunaaq (Anguti Johnston) and Nipangi Huittuq (Vinnie Karetak), a quirky duo, who host a show from their tent on the arctic tundra. The half hour television show also features skits, commercial parodies, fake newscasts, and more. One of its aims is to promote Inuit languages. It specifically uses the Inuktitut language.

The television program was originally produced by the Inuit Broadcasting Corporation as a children and youth show. In 2015, Qanukiaq Studios Inc., set up by the original cast and crew, took over as the shows new producers. Initially the show was on a low budget of $10,000-20,000 but the budget for the 2017 season was three times this. In 2016, a season was delayed due to budget issues.
