= Women on Trial (2026 film) =

2026 French drama film

- French: L'Affaire Marie-Claire
- Directed by: Lauriane Escaffre; Yvo Muller
- Written by: Lauriane Escaffre; Yvo Muller
- Produced by: Foucauld Barré; Nicolas Duval Adassovsky
- Starring: Charlotte Gainsbourg; Saul Benchetrit; Cécile de France
- Cinematography: Jean-François Hensgens
- Edited by: Valérie Deseine; Céline Cloarec
- Music by: Philippe Rombi
- Production company: Quad Films
- Distributed by: Gaumont
- Release dates: 18 May 2026 (Cannes); 4 November 2026 (France)
- Running time: 102 minutes
- Country: France
- Language: French

Women on Trial (French: L'Affaire Marie-Claire) is a 2026 French drama film written and directed by Lauriane Escaffre and Yvo Muller. It follows the Bobigny trial of 1972, in which teenager Marie-Claire Chevalier (Saül Benchetrit) was placed on trial for having an abortion after being raped by a classmate, with her successful defense by Gisèle Halimi (Charlotte Gainsbourg) having been one of the key precedents for the passage of the Veil Act, which decriminalized abortion in France.

The film had its world premiere in the Special Screenings section of the 2026 Cannes Film Festival on 18 May. the film was released in France on 4 November.

== Cast ==
- Charlotte Gainsbourg as Gisèle Halimi
- Saül Benchetrit as Marie-Claire Chevalier
- Cécile de France as Michèle Chevalier, Marie-Claire's mother
- Lauriane Escaffre as Colette
- Yvo Muller as Jaques Monod
- Florence Loiret Caille as Micheline Bambuck
- Sarah Suco as Lucette Duboucheix
- Grégory Gadebois as Claude Faux
- Xavier Robic
- Farida Ouchani
- Quentin Gouverneur
- Sandrine Guisier

== Production ==
Gainsbourg's casting as Halimi was controversial, as Halimi had been an outspoken advocate for the human rights of Palestinians, while Gainsbourg signed an open letter during the film's production denouncing France's decision to extend legal recognition to Palestine. The discussion further noted that although Halimi was a Tunisian Jew, both Women on Trial and an announced but unreleased project that would star Virginie Efira had cast white actresses to play her.

== Release ==
The film premiered in the Special Screenings program at the 2026 Cannes Film Festival. It was subsequently screened at the Angoulême Francophone Film Festival in August, followed by its North American premiere in September at the 2026 Cinéfest Sudbury International Film Festival.

It was released in France on 4 November.

== Reception ==
=== Critical response ===
Veronica Orciari of Cineuropa wrote that "Women on Trial is a movie that works perfectly well both as an historical document and as a powerful testament to the resilience of women through the generations. It’s not the most original film, nor is it the most visually striking, but it does not set out to be either of those things."

For Screen Daily, Amber Wilkinson wrote that "this pacy retelling, which keeps its focus on Halimi, interweaves the trial itself with the run-up to it and events outside the courtroom to solid effect, although the fact that the outcome of the case is known from the outset inevitably blunts some of the dramatic tension."

=== Accolades ===
Award	Date of ceremony	Category	Recipient(s)	Result	Ref(s)
Cinéfest Sudbury International Film Festival	2026	Audience Choice, Feature Film	Women on Trial	Runner-up	
Cinéfest Sudbury International Film Festival	2026	Inspiring Voices and Perspectives	Women on Trial	Won	
