= In Blue (film) =

2017 film

- Film poster
- Directed by: Jaap van Heusden
- Written by: Jaap van Heusden
- Starring: Maria Kraakman
- Cinematography: Melle van Essen
- Edited by: Jasper Quispel
- Music by: Minco Eggersman
- Release date: 14 September 2017
- Running time: 102 minutes
- Countries: Netherlands; Romania
- Languages: Dutch; English; Romanian
- Box office: $27,219

In Blue is a 2017 Dutch drama film directed by Jaap van Heusden. It was shortlisted by the EYE Film Institute Netherlands as one of the eight films to be selected as the potential Dutch submission for the Academy Award for Best Foreign Language Film at the 90th Academy Awards. However, it was not selected, with Layla M. being chosen as the Dutch entry.

== Cast ==
- Maria Kraakman as Lin
- Bogdan Iancu as Nicu
- Ellis van den Brink as Lin's mother
- Maria Rainea as Flori
- Ada Gales as Alex
- Patrick Vervueren as Thomas
