= Bernard Cassen =

French journalist (1937–2025)

- Born: 2 November 1937; Paris, France
- Died: 12 June 2025 (aged 87)
- Occupation: Journalist
- Known for: Founder of ATTAC

Bernard Cassen (2 November 1937 – 12 June 2025) was a French journalist.

== Life and career ==
Cassen was a founder of ATTAC, and a member of its Scientific Advisory Board.

He was general director of the Le Monde diplomatique newspaper from 1973 to January 2008.

Cassen died on 12 June 2025, at the age of 87.
