= About Memory and Loss =

- French: Notes sur la mémoire et l'oubli
- Directed by: Amélie Hardy
- Written by: Amélie Hardy
- Based on: Un présent infini: notes sur la mémoire et l'oubli by Rafaële Germain
- Produced by: Isabelle Grignon-Francke
- Narrated by: Alexa-Jeanne Dubé
- Cinematography: Louis Turcotte
- Edited by: Louis Chevalier-Dagenais
- Music by: Alex Lefaivre
- Production company: Club Vidéo
- Distributed by: Travelling Distribution
- Release date: October 6, 2022 (FNC)
- Running time: 8 minutes
- Country: Canada
- Language: French

About Memory and Loss (French: Notes sur la mémoire et l'oubli) is a Canadian short documentary film, directed by Amélie Hardy and released in 2022. Based on Rafaële Germain's non-fiction essay Un présent infini: notes sur la mémoire et l'oubli, the film is a meditation on the cultural process of deciding what elements of history to preserve and archive for posterity, and what elements of history to discard.

The film premiered at the 2022 Festival du nouveau cinéma.

== Awards ==
Award	Date of ceremony	Category	Recipient(s)	Result	Ref(s)
Prix Iris	December 10, 2023	Best Short Documentary	Amélie Hardy, Isabelle Grignon-Francke	Won	
