= Run Terry Run =

2025 Canadian documentary film

- Theatrical release poster
- Directed by: Sean Menard
- Written by: Sean Menard
- Produced by: Sean Menard; Molly Ye
- Starring: Terry Fox
- Edited by: Sean Menard
- Music by: Tom Caffey
- Distributed by: Elevation Pictures
- Release dates: November 10, 2025 (Roy Thomson Hall); October 9, 2026
- Running time: 109 minutes
- Country: Canada
- Language: English

Run Terry Run is a 2025 Canadian documentary film, directed by Sean Menard. The film is a behind-the-scenes depiction of Terry Fox's 1980 Marathon of Hope, through previously unseen footage taken in 1980 by filmmaker John Simpson, which passed into the possession of the Terry Fox Foundation but had languished in storage, and was long believed to be lost entirely, until it was located again in the 2020s.

== Distribution ==
The film received a special advance screening on November 10, 2025, at Roy Thomson Hall, with the Toronto Symphony Orchestra performing the score live. It received a gala screening at the 2026 Toronto International Film Festival, before going into commercial release in October 2026 in 150 theatres across Canada, the widest commercial release for a non-musical documentary film in over 20 years.

The film was also screened at the Windsor International Film Festival, in competition for the $25,000 WIFF Prize in Canadian Film.

== Reception ==
=== Critical response ===
On the review aggregator website Rotten Tomatoes, 92% of 12 critics' reviews are positive, with an average rating of 8.4/10. Metacritic, which uses a weighted average, assigned the film a score of 87 out of 100, based on four critics, indicating "universal acclaim".

Zachary Lee of RogerEbert.com gave the film three out of four stars and wrote that it "should be studied for how it properly builds a documentary around its archival footage." In a positive review, Rachel West of That Shelf wrote, "Almost 45 years later, Fox's story remains extraordinary not because the legend has grown larger, but because the person at its centre was so profoundly human. By allowing Fox to tell his own story, Menard reminds us why his legacy has endured – and why it still matters."

=== Box office ===
In commercial release the film took in CA$116,000 at the box office on its opening weekend, the biggest opening take for a non-concert documentary since Fahrenheit 9/11 in 2004.

=== Awards ===
At the 2026 Cinéfest Sudbury International Film Festival, the film won the Audience Choice award for documentaries, and the juried award for Best Canadian Feature.
