= Colin Cunningham =

American television and film actor

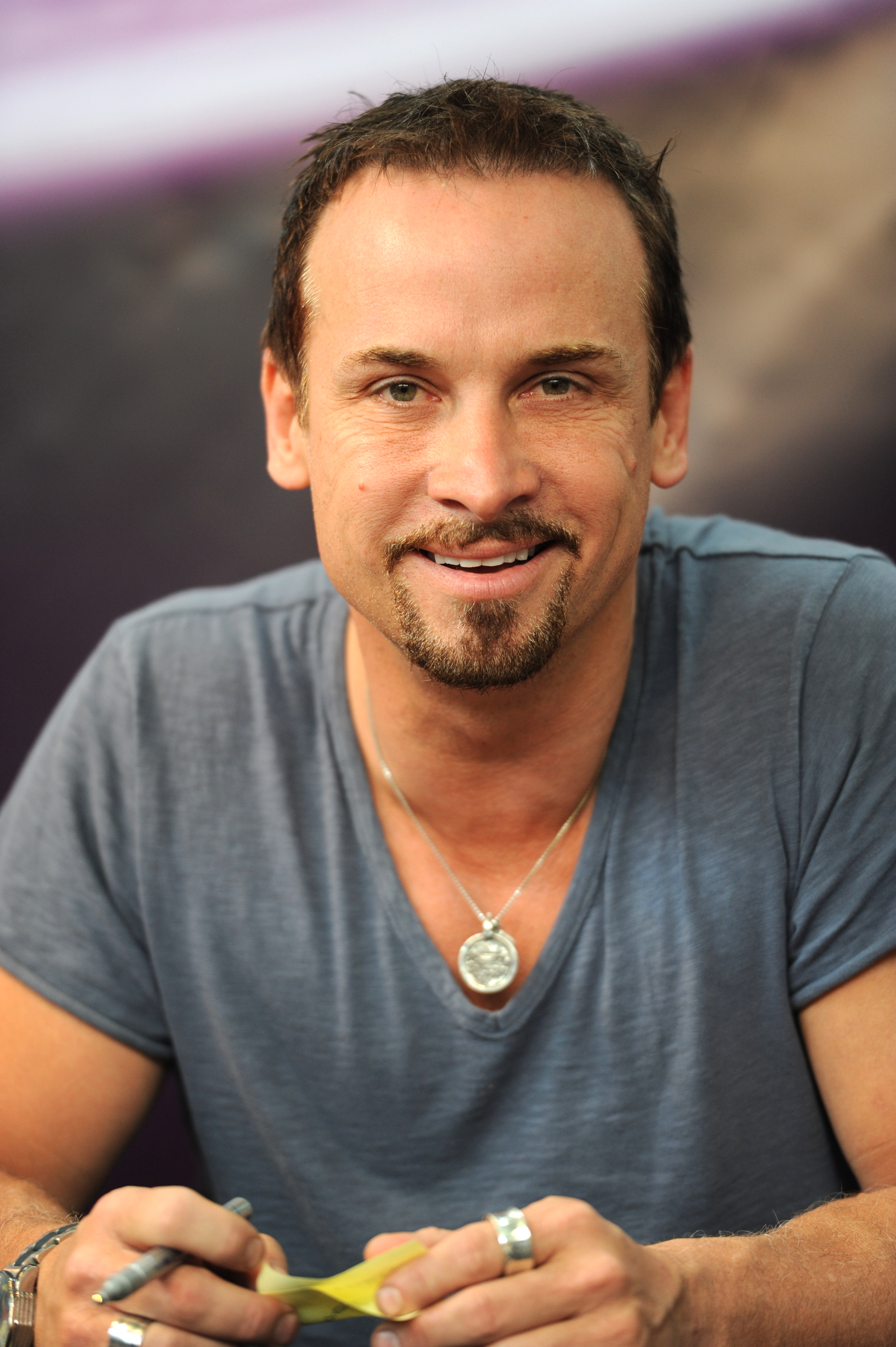
- Cunningham at SciFi Convention Toulouse, 2012
- Born: Colin Alexander Cunningham; 1966 (age 59–60); Los Angeles, California, U.S.
- Occupations: Actor, director
- Years active: 1994–present

Colin Alexander Cunningham (born 1966) is an American television and film actor. Cunningham is best known for his roles as John Pope in the TNT science fiction series Falling Skies and as Major/Lt.Col Paul Davis on Stargate SG-1 and Stargate Atlantis.

== Career ==
Cunningham began his acting career when he was dared by a friend to audition for a role in a public casting call. He also studied directing at the Vancouver Film School.

He had a recurring role on Stargate SG-1 as USAF Major Paul Davis (15 episodes). Another major role was his portrayal of Brian Curtis, a crooked cop, in the popular, award-winning Canadian series Da Vinci's Inquest. He reprises the role of Brian Curtis in the 2006 sequel series, Da Vinci's City Hall. He appeared as Steven Lefkowitz in the short-lived jPod and in several episodes of The L Word. Other appearances include the Canadian series Flashpoint and in Sanctuary, where he plays the husband of a biologist friend of Henry Foss. His most notable role is as John Pope on Falling Skies

He also gained critical acclaim as Master of Ceremonies, Julian Slink in the Syfy series Blood Drive.

He starred as an anti-clone activist named Tripp in the 2000 thriller The 6th Day, and as the character McCabe in the 2005 film Elektra.

He wrote, directed, and starred in a short film titled Centigrade, a contemporary thriller. It was the winner of the 2007 Kick Start Award and in 2008 made the 'short list' for an Academy Award Nomination.

In addition to acting, he has directed numerous music videos for Country Music Television (CMT). He plays tenor saxophone and is band leader for the funk/soul band WHAT-THE-FUNK!, which was formed in 2013.

He stars as the 5th-century warlord Vortigern in the Arthurian fantasy series The Pendragon Cycle: Rise of the Merlin (2026), based on the books by Stephen R. Lawhead.

== Filmography ==
Film
Year	Title	Role	Notes
1995	Hard Evidence	Dietrich	
1998	Zacharia Farted	Michael Bates	
2000	The Silencer	Hale Bryant	
2000	Best in Show	New York Butcher	
2000	The 6th Day	Tripp	
2001	Antitrust	Building 20 Guard	
2003	Stealing Sinatra	John Foss	
2004	The 30 Second Guaranteed Foolproof Ancient Cantonese Method	Smoker	Short
2005	Elektra	McCabe	
2005	Say Yes	The Pool Shark	Short
2006	Incident at Alma	Reverend Wilkens	Short
2006	Insider Trading	Thomas Reid	Short
2006	The Entrance	Officer Banks	
2007	Human Resources	Gerald	Short
2007	Centigrade	Man	Short
2007	Breakfast with Scot	Billy	
2008	Stargate: Continuum	Major Paul Davis	
2011	Afghan Luke	Christer	
2011	Rise of the Damned	Zan	
2012	Goal!	Commentator	Short
2014	Guardian Angel	Gregor Sarkoff	
2014	The Historian	Chris Fletcher	
2017	Little Pink House	Billy Von Winkle	
2021	Bashira	John Cavanaugh	
2022	Curse of Crom: The Legend of Halloween	Greg	
2023	He Never Left	Gabriel	
2023	Love in Focus	Barty Dixon	
2024	Horizon: An American Saga – Chapter 1	Chisholm	
2024	Horizon: An American Saga – Chapter 2	Chisholm	
2026	Last Moon	The Man	

Television
Year	Title	Role	Notes
1994	For the Love of Nancy	Intern	TV movie
1994	Robin's Hoods	Madison	Episode: "Double or Nothing"
1995	The Commish	Morris	Episode: "The Johnny Club"
1995	The Marshal	Speedy	Episode: "The Ballad of Lucas Burke"
1995–1996	The X-Files	Dr. Stroman / Lt. Terry Wilmer / Escalante	3 episodes
1996	Robin of Locksley	Walter Nottingham	TV movie
1996	The Outer Limits	Professor George Ernst	Episode: "Worlds Apart"
1996	Captains Courageous	Manuel	TV movie
1997	Volcano: Fire on the Mountain	Stan Sinclair	TV movie
1997	Hostile Force	Larry	TV movie
1997	Dead Fire	Cal Brody	TV movie
1997	Five Desperate Hours	Wesley Ballard	TV movie
1997–1998	Dead Man's Gun	Deputy Floyd / Reverend Franklin Justice	2 episodes
1998	The Sentinel	Dr. Burke	Episode: "Mirror Image"
1998	Viper	Dr. Peter Markham	Episode: "Trust No One"
1998	The Net	Josh Brand	Episode: "Lucy's Life"
1998	It's True!	Sheriff	Episode: "The Rats of Rumfordton"
1999	The Crow: Stairway to Heaven	Cardosa	Episode: "Brother's Keeper"
1999	Y2K	Ross Singer	TV movie
1999–2001	Beggars and Choosers	Herb Kolodny	22 episodes
1999–2005	Stargate SG-1	Major Paul Davis	15 episodes
2000	Final Ascent	Wayne	TV movie
2000–2001	Big Sound	Nick Keester	2 episodes
2001	Dead Last	Ray Varner	Episode: "Pilot"
2001	Strange Frequency	Jay	Episode: "A Change Will Do You Good"
2001	Dark Angel	DAC	Episode: "Bag 'Em"
2001	UC: Undercover	Agent Roger Faraday	Episode: "Nobody Rides for Free"
2001–2002	Cold Squad	Sean Ryerson	3 episodes
2002	Mysterious Ways	Mike Hughes	Episode: "Friends in Need"
2002	Mr. St. Nick	Agent Nardo	TV movie
2002–2005	Da Vinci's Inquest	Det. Brian Curtis	33 episodes
2003	The Twilight Zone	Seth	Episode: "The Path"
2003	Smallville	Nicky	Episode: "Insurgence"
2003	Behind the Camera: The Unauthorized Story of Three's Company	Steve	TV movie
2003	Out of Order	Network Executive	6 episodes
2003	Wilder Days	Car Pirate/Makeshift	TV movie
2003	Stealing Christmas	Mail Security Guard	TV movie
2003–2004	Andromeda	Shig	2 episodes
2004	CSI: Miami	Ross Kaye	Episode: "Stalkerazzi"
2004	The L Word	Harry Samchuk	2 episodes
2004	The Chris Isaak Show	Neil	2 episodes
2004–2006	The Collector	Narrator / Nuremberg Devil / The Devil	23 episodes
2004–2007	The 4400	Ryan Powell	2 episodes
2005	The Dead Zone	Pendragon	Episode: "Broken Circle"
2005	Reunion	Michael Duggan	Episode: "1994"
2005–2006	Da Vinci's City Hall	Det. Brian Curtis	8 episodes
2006	Lesser Evil	Jon	TV movie
2006	Saved	Jack	Episode: "Code Zero"
2006	Behind the Camera: The Unauthorized Story of 'Diff'rent Strokes	Vic Perillo	TV movie
2007	Masters of Horror	Virgil	Episode: "We All Scream for Ice Cream"
2007	Psych	Marvin	Episode: "He Loves Me, He Loves Me Not, He Loves Me, Oops He's Dead"
2007	Men in Trees	Lawyer	Episode: "Chemical Reactions"
2007	Eureka	Dr. Paul Suenos	Episode: "Noche de suenos"
2008	The Guard	Eric	Episode: "Coming Through Fog"
2008	jPod	Steve Lefkowitz	10 episodes
2009	Stargate Atlantis	Lt. Col Paul Davis	Episode: "Enemy at the Gate"
2009	The Crusader	Paul Weebler	Pilot
2009	Impact	David Rhodes	2 episodes
2009	Fireball	Tim Timmonds	TV movie
2009	Sanctuary	Gerald	Episode: "Fragments"
2010	Goblin	Owen	TV movie
2010	Living in Your Car	Neil Stiles	13 episodes
2010	Flashpoint	Roy Lane	2 episodes
2011	Shattered	Jack	Episode: "Unaired Pilot"
2011–2015	Falling Skies	John Pope	Main cast; 47 episodes
2012	Perception	Gerard Permut	Episode: "Pilot"
2012	The Eleventh Victim	Cruise	TV movie
2014	Klondike	Swiftwater Bill	3 episodes
2014	Fools for Hire	Det. Lacey	3 episodes
2014	Hell on Wheels	Gambler	Episode: "Chicken Hill"
2014	Rush	Tyle Duggans	Episode: "Because I Got High"
2016	The Magicians	Bjorn	Episode: "Remedial Battle Magic"
2017	Blood Drive	Julian Slink	Main cast; 13 episodes
2018	Preacher	TC	Main cast; 10 episodes
2019	Hawaii Five-0	Scott Hester	Episode: "Ke ala o ka pū"
2019	Stumptown	Wallace Kane	2 episodes
2021	Star Trek: New Voyages	Captain Christopher Pike	Episode: "Origins: The Protracted Man"
2021	Harmony	Patrick McKee	Episode: "Pilot"
2026	The Pendragon Cycle: Rise of the Merlin	Vortigern	Episode: "A Fatherless Child"
