= Last Moon (film) =

2026 Canadian horror film

- Directed by: Brandon D. Cox
- Written by: Brandon D. Cox
- Produced by: Ryan Keller; Jonathan Hlibka
- Starring: Shawn Doyle; Colin Cunningham
- Cinematography: Nik Pilecki
- Edited by: Sydney Cowper
- Music by: Geoff Raffan
- Production company: Other Animal Entertainment
- Release date: September 24, 2026 (Cinéfest)
- Running time: 90 minutes
- Country: Canada
- Language: English

Last Moon is a Canadian Western horror film, directed by Brandon D. Cox and slated for release in 2026. Set in the 1890s on a frontier town on the Canada-United States border, the film stars Shawn Doyle as a former bounty hunter trying to live a peaceful life under a new identity, but who is drawn back into the violence and brutality of his old life when his family is terrorized by a monster wreaking vengeance for a massacre the bounty hunter committed before retiring.

The cast also includes Colin Cunningham, Lora Burke, Morgan Bedard, Kayla Dumont and Mina Borody.

The film, Cox's full-length directorial debut, was shot in and around Powassan, Ontario, in summer 2025.

The film is slated to premiere at the 2026 Cinéfest Sudbury International Film Festival.
