= The Carter Effect =

2017 Canadian documentary film

- Film poster
- Directed by: Sean Menard
- Produced by: LeBron James; Maverick Carter; Drake; Adel Future Nur
- Starring: Vince Carter
- Cinematography: Tomasz Kurek
- Edited by: Sean Menard
- Music by: Tom Caffey
- Production company: Uninterrupted
- Distributed by: Toronto International Film Festival; Netflix
- Release dates: September 9, 2017 (Canada); April 23, 2018 (United States)
- Running time: 60 minutes
- Countries: Canada; United States
- Language: English

The Carter Effect is a 2017 documentary film directed by Sean Menard. It covers the impact of Vince Carter in Canada when he was still playing for the Toronto Raptors of the National Basketball Association (NBA). The film was shown at the 2017 Toronto International Film Festival and was produced by LeBron James's digital video company, Uninterrupted. Additionally, interviews of fellow NBA stars, former teammates, family members, and people associated with the Toronto Raptors, combined with archival footage of Carter, were used throughout the movie. Notable appearances in the film include his cousin Tracy McGrady, Canadian basketball star Steve Nash, former NBA commissioner David Stern, and Toronto natives Director X and Drake.

== Overview ==
The film opens with the unveiling of the new NBA expansion team, the Toronto Raptors, one of the two Canadian teams since the Toronto Huskies folded in 1947. In a country dominated by hockey, basketball tries to find its way to the hearts of Canadian families. Tracy McGrady shares how he struggled as an 18-year old rookie out of high school to be living in Toronto and not having someone near his age to be around with. During the 1998 NBA draft in Vancouver, the Toronto Raptors select Carter's college teammate, Antawn Jamison, with Carter being selected next by the Golden State Warriors before David Stern announces the trade between Carter and Jamison. Carter announces his excitement in playing for Toronto with his cousin McGrady. Carter and McGrady form a bond and is becoming one of the best young duo in the NBA.

Carter and McGrady retell the story of how they almost did not make it to the 2000 NBA Slam Dunk Contest and how Carter have forced McGrady to join him in competing despite McGrady knowing Carter is going to win anyway. Carter impresses and becomes the 2000 Slam Dunk Champion. This made people talk about Carter and the Raptors more as Canadians become prouder of having the Raptors as their team. With Nike signing Carter to an endorsement deal, it catapulted the sneaker industry in Toronto.

Carter starts to leave his footprint in the Toronto area, opening a nightclub where NBA players can go to when in town, inaugurating a basketball court, getting companies to endorse in basketball in Canada.

The Raptors finally lands a spot on national TV against the Phoenix Suns, they win the game and Carter was phenomenal. The Raptors reach the NBA playoffs for the first time in franchise history but lose to the New York Knicks. This marks the last time McGrady and Carter play together as McGrady leaves for the Orlando Magic during the off-season. Controversy surrounds Carter during the Conference semifinals at the 2001 NBA Playoffs when Carter attends his graduation ceremony at University of North Carolina in the morning of Game 7 against the Philadelphia 76ers. Carter misses a potential game-winning shot and the 76ers advance to the conference finals. During the 2001 NBA off-season, Carter announces his contract extension with the Raptors. He hosts a charity game, partly to showcase to other players what the city of Toronto really has to offer even during the summer.

The CEO of Maple Leaf Sports & Entertainment, Richard Peddie, hires Rob Babcock as the new general manager. Injuries start to haunt Carter at the same time he begins to feel the new management is going in a different direction. Carter gets traded to the New Jersey Nets. Fans felt Carter wanted out, on his return game, they showered Carter with boos as the announcer introduces him as well as every time he touches the ball. It has been like that until about 10 years later, with the Raptors celebrating their 20th season anniversary, they have been playing tribute videos during home games. When Carter's team, the Memphis Grizzlies, visited, a video tribute of Carter played and the fans start to give him a standing ovation that gets Carter to tears.

A wave of Canadian players start to make some noise in the NBA and the rise is being attributed to Carter's influence in the Canadian basketball scene. Canadian entertainers feel that Carter opened up opportunities for them. More and more Canadian fans are now embracing basketball and Raptors as LeBron James voices out that he respects how the fans support their team. The film ends with Drake asking "What if?" Carter never played for the Raptors.

== Release ==
The film was initially released on September 9, 2017 in Canada at the 2017 Toronto International Film Festival. It was also released in the United States on April 13, 2018 at the Cleveland International Film Festival and on April 23, 2018 at the RiverRun International Film Festival. It was made available through Netflix on May 1, 2018.

=== Critical response ===
The film received an unfavorable review from critic Radheyan Simonpillai of NOW, "To fill out its run time and over-emphasize its point that [Vince] Carter put Toronto on the map not just in basketball but hip-hop culture, the film starts fumbling with facts."

== See also ==
- List of basketball films
