= A Wolf in the Suburbs =

- Directed by: Amélie Hardy
- Written by: Amélie Hardy
- Produced by: Rosalie Chicoine Perreault
- Starring: Wolf Ruck
- Cinematography: Myriam Payette
- Edited by: Louis Chevalier-Dagenais
- Music by: Joseph Marchand
- Production company: Metafilms
- Distributed by: Travelling Distribution
- Release date: March 14, 2026 (SXSW)
- Running time: 19 minutes
- Country: Canada
- Language: English

A Wolf in the Suburbs is a Canadian short documentary film, directed by Amélie Hardy and released in 2026. The film profiles Wolf Ruck, a resident of Mississauga, Ontario, who has fought for a number of years against a city by-law about lawn upkeep, seeking the right to maintain his yard in a natural, ecologically friendly state as a pollinator habitat.

The film was shot in 2025.

The film premiered at the 2026 South by Southwest Film & TV Festival, and had its Canadian premiere at the Regard short film festival. It was also screened at the 2026 Hot Docs Canadian International Documentary Festival.

== Awards ==
Award	Date of ceremony	Category	Recipient(s)	Result	Ref(s)
Regard	2026	Canadian Grand Prize	Amélie Hardy	Won	
Regard	2026	FIPRESCI International Critics' Prize	Amélie Hardy	Won	
Cinéfest Sudbury International Film Festival	2026	Audience Choice, Short Film	Amélie Hardy	Won	
