= Marie-Claire Chevalier =

French abortion activist (1955–2022)

- Born: 12 July 1955; Meung-sur-Loire, France
- Died: 23 January 2022 (aged 66); Orléans, France
- Occupation: Activist

Marie-Claire Chevalier (12 July 1955 – 23 January 2022) was a French abortion rights activist. She was defended in the Bobigny trial by Gisèle Halimi in 1972. The victory in this trial was key for the legalization of abortion in France and the Veil Act.

== Biography ==
Chevalier was born in Meung-sur-Loire on 12 July 1955. She grew up in a working-class family alongside her mother and two sisters in Paris unité urbaine. At the age of 16, she was raped by an 18-year-old male classmate who attended the same secondary school as her. She then found herself pregnant and asked her mother, Michèle Chevalier, to help her find a means of abortion. She received an abortion underground, as it was illegal in France at the time, but she suffered from hemorrhaging and required hospitalization.

Arrested for a case of grand theft auto unrelated to the rape, Chevalier's rapist revealed her abortion as a means to escape prosecution and obtain his release. Shortly thereafter, Chevalier was arrested and imprisoned. She was defended in the Bobigny trial by Gisèle Halimi, alongside four other women. She was released on 11 October 1972 after a trial behind closed doors, due to her status as a minor. The trial was described as a "political affair" by Halimi and Simone de Beauvoir. In her 1973 book, Le procès de Bobigny, Halimi defended Chevalier's decision to abort and said it was a "citizen act of civic disobedience". The impact of the verdict led to the passing of the Veil Act in January 1975, which legalized abortion in France.

After the trial and verdict, Chevalier continued to suffer from the traumatic event and attempted suicide. However, she maintained some anonymity and worked as a nurse's aide near Orléans. In 1988, she gave birth to a daughter, and years later, became a grandmother.

In 2006, she commented on Halimi's book, Le procès de Bobigny, mentioning that the Veil Act was "a little thanks to me that it was voted, it was a bit mine". The year before, a blue metal footbridge was named in her honor in Bobigny in front of the commune's courthouse, but it was closed in 2021.

Chevalier died from brain cancer at a hospital in Orleans on 23 January 2022 at the age of 66.

She was portrayed by Saul Benchetrit in the 2026 drama film Women on Trial (L'Affaire Marie-Claire).
