= Centigrade (2007 film) =

- Colin Cunningham as Man
- Directed by: Colin Cunningham
- Written by: Colin Cunningham
- Produced by: Derrick Garland; Madison Graie
- Starring: Colin Cunningham; Daniel Brodsky; Ron Sauvé; Bernhard Lachkovics; Derrick Garland; Fulivo Cecere; Mark Rickerby; Madison Graie
- Cinematography: Kevin Hall
- Edited by: Jonathan Eric Tyrell
- Music by: Graeme Wearmouth
- Distributed by: Shorts International
- Release date: August 25, 2007 (Montréal Film Festival)
- Running time: 20 minutes
- Country: Canada
- Language: English

Centigrade is a 2007 thriller short film starring Colin Cunningham, Daniel Brodsky, and Bernhard Lachkovics about a man trapped in a trailer. It won Leo Awards and awards at Method Fest Independent Film Festival and Cinequest Film Festival. The producers are working to turn the short into a feature film.

== Plot ==
A Man (Colin Cunningham) awakens one morning with a hangover to discover that he has been taken hostage aboard his old, run down trailer which is being towed down the highway by a mysterious black truck; he desperately tries to find a way out of the sealed vehicle before he burns inside. Colin Cunningham describes the movie as follows: "Centigrade, in a nutshell, is about a guy who lives in an old dilapidated, busted-up trailer. There's no wheels on it. It's just laying dead in the weeds. [The owner] does a bad thing, and he wakes up in the morning and [the trailer is] rolling down the highway. It's being towed by a big, black pickup truck. The doors won't open and the windows won't break and he can't get out. That's essentially what it's about. It's about a man trapped."

== Production ==
The part of the main character was originally to go to another actor, but difficulties forced Cunningham to take the part himself. The script was written 17 years ago; Madison Graie suggested to Cunningham that they apply for the Directors Guild of Canada's "Kickstart Program" to make Fahrenheit (Centigrade's original title). The pair won one of the five Kickstart awards and used the $20,000 CAD prize to make the film.

Due to signing with Shorts International, Centigrade will be available on iTunes, the first Canadian live action short to appear there. Cunningham and Graie are working on turning Centigrade into a feature film.

== Cast ==
Daniel Brodsky as Boy

- Colin Cunningham as Man
- Daniel Brodsky as Boy
- Ron Sauvé as Man in Other Trailer
- Bernhard Lachkovics as Black Truck Driver
- Derrick Garland as Burgundy Truck Driver
- Fulvio Cecere as Trailer Graveyard
- Mark Rickerby as Trailer Graveyard
- Madison Graie as Trailer Graveyard
- Sterling Wong as Boy Double

== Awards ==
=== Wins ===
- 2008: Cinequest Film Festival Award for Best Narrative Short Film (Madison Graie)
- 2008: Leo Award for Best Short Drama (Madison Graie, Derrick Garland)
- 2008: Leo Award for Best Direction in a Short Drama (Colin Cunningham)
- 2008: Leo Award for Best Performance by a Male in a Short Drama (Colin Cunningham)
- 2008: Leo Award for Best Make-Up in a Short Drama (Jayne Dancose)
- 2008: Leo Award for Best Overall Sound in a Short Drama (Real Gauvreau)
- 2008: Method Fest Independent Film Festival Award for Best actor in a Short Film (Colin Cunningham)

Centigrade's Award for Best Narrative Short at Cinequest Film Festival qualifies it to be nominated for an Oscar.

=== Nominations ===
- 2008: Leo Award for Best Cinematography in a Short Drama (Kevin Hall)
- 2008: Leo Award for Best Picture Editing in a Short Drama (Jonathan Eric Tyrrell)
- 2008: Method Fest Independent Film Festival Award for Best Short Film
- 2008: Vancouver International Film Festival Award for Best Emerging Director (Colin Cunningham)

=== Official Selections ===
- 2008: Cannes Short Film Corner
- 2008: Jackson Hole Film Festival
- 2008: Palm Springs International Film Festival
- 2008: Santa Barbara International Film Festival
