= Darlene Love: I Know Where I've Been =

2026 Canadian documentary film

- Directed by: Barry Avrich
- Written by: Barry Avrich
- Produced by: Barry Avrich; Taraji P. Henson; Mark Selby
- Starring: Darlene Love
- Cinematography: Ken Ng
- Edited by: Dave Kennedy
- Production companies: Melbar Entertainment; TPH Entertainment
- Release date: September 13, 2026 (TIFF)
- Running time: 115 minutes
- Country: Canada
- Language: English

Darlene Love: I Know Where I've Been is a Canadian documentary film, directed by Barry Avrich and released in 2026. The film is a portrait of singer and actor Darlene Love.

Other figures appearing in the film to discuss Love and her legacy include Cher, Andra Day, Jimmy Fallon, Lou Adler, David Letterman, Paul Shaffer, Marc Shaiman, Nancy Sinatra, Robert Smigel, Bruce Springsteen, Dionne Warwick and Steven van Zandt.

The film premiered in the TIFF Docs program at the 2026 Toronto International Film Festival, where it won the People's Choice Award for Documentaries. At the 2026 Cinéfest Sudbury International Film Festival, it was runner-up for the Audience Choice award for documentaries.
