= Le Monde diplomatique =

Monthly newspaper in France

- Type: Monthly newspaper
- Format: Berliner
- Owner: Groupe Le Monde
- Publisher: Maurice Lemoine
- Editor: Benoît Bréville
- Founded: 1954; 72 years ago
- Political alignment: Alter-globalization
- Language: French, translated editions in English and 22 other languages
- Headquarters: Paris, France
- Circulation: 179,943 (2020, French edition)
- ISSN: 0026-9395
- Website: monde-diplomatique.fr

Le Monde diplomatique (French pronunciation: [lə mɔ̃d diplɔmatik]; meaning "The Diplomatic World", and shortened as Le Diplo in French) is a French monthly newspaper founded in 1954, offering mostly analysis and opinion on international politics, culture, and current affairs. As of 2023, there are 33 editions (9 digital-only) in 24 languages worldwide.

Their editorial line has been described as left-wing, particularly for its consistent criticisms of neoliberalism and support of alter-globalization, starting around 1973.

The publication is 51% owned by Le Monde diplomatique SA, a subsidiary company of Le Monde, from which it remains editorially independent.

== History ==
=== 1954–1989 ===
Le Monde diplomatique was founded in 1954 by Hubert Beuve-Méry, founder and director of Le Monde, the French newspaper of record. Subtitled the "organ of diplomatic circles and of large international organisations," 5,000 copies were distributed, comprising eight pages, dedicated to foreign policy and geopolitics. Its first editor-in-chief, François Honti, developed the newspaper as a scholarly reference journal. Honti attentively followed the birth of the Non-Aligned Movement, created out of the 1955 Bandung Conference, and the issues of the "Third World".

Claude Julien became the newspaper's second editor in January 1973. At this point, the circulation of Le Monde diplomatique had increased from 5,000 to 50,000 copies; under Julien, and with the help of Micheline Paunet, the paper's circulation would grow to 120,000 in the next 20 years. Around this time, as Le Monde shifted its editorial line towards favoring neoliberal ideology, Le Monde diplomatique shifted its focus toward a radical critique of Reagan policy, and criticism of imperialistic liberal policy. Without renouncing its "Third-worldism" position, it extended the treatment of its subjects, concentrating on international economic and monetary problems, strategic relations, the Middle-East conflict, etc. One of the contributors was Samir Frangieh, a leftist Lebanese journalist.

=== 1989–present ===
After the November 1989 Fall of the Berlin Wall following the dissolution of the Soviet Union, and the 1990-1991 Gulf War, the newspaper began to criticise what it described as an "American crusade".

Under his leadership, Le Monde diplomatique analysed the post-Cold War world, paying specific attention to "ethnic" conflicts that arose in this period: the wars in former Yugoslavia, the 1994 Rwandan genocide, the conflicts in the Caucasus, etc., as well as to the new information technology.

Ramonet has also published books about the media and their relationship to national societies. As noted by François Cusset, French universities have not developed an interdisciplinary approach to media studies. He says that leftist journals including Le Monde diplomatique have had an editorial approach that is committed to "critique of dominant media", both in terms of their roles in setting agendas and in enjoying status perks. Both Ramonet and his successor, Serge Halimi, published books that critiqued the media from outside academic circles.

The newspaper established financial and editorial independence from Le Monde in 1996, forming its own company. Le Monde owns 51%; the Friends of Le Monde diplomatique and Günter Holzmann Association, comprising the paper's staff, together own 49%.

In an editorial in January 1995, Ignacio Ramonet coined the term "pensée unique" ("single thought") to describe the supremacy of the neoliberal ideology. The newspaper supported the November–December 1995 general strike in France against Prime minister Alain Juppé's (RPR) plan to cut pensions.

Three years later, after a proposal in a 1997 editorial by Ramonet, Le Monde diplomatique took a founding role in the creation of ATTAC, an alter-globalisation NGO. It was founded to advocate the Tobin tax, and chapters have been started throughout the world. It now supports a variety of left-wing causes. The newspaper also took an important role in the organisation of the 2001 Porto Alegre World Social Forum.

Ramonet devoted considerable space to reporting on Hugo Chávez, with whom he was said to have developed a close relationship, and his Bolivarian Revolution.

Ramonet was succeeded by Serge Halimi who had a PhD in political science from the University of California Berkeley. In 2018, LMD published a total of 37 print and online editions, in a total of 20 languages.

The August 2017 issue of the monthly was not marketed in Algeria. According to sources close to the distributor, the newspaper did not get permission to do so. Algerian authorities did not explain. The heads of the newspaper claim that it was "banned" from sale in the country because of a report by journalist Pierre Daum. He is best known for writing a book about the Harkis who stayed in Algeria after Independence, and about the difficult social and economic situation of some young Algerians.

== Le Monde diplomatique SA ==
André Fontaine, the director of Le Monde, signed a 1989 convention with Claude Julien which guaranteed the monthly's autonomy. But it gained complete statutory, economic and financial independence in 1996 with the creation of Le Monde diplomatique SA. With a donation from Günter Holzmann, a German antifascist exiled before World War II to Bolivia, the monthly's employees acquired approximately one-quarter of the capital, while Les Amis du Monde diplomatique, a 1901 Law association of readers, bought another quarter.

Thus, since the end of 2000, the newspaper's employees and readers retain 49% of Le Monde diplomatique SA's capital, largely above the control stock necessary to control the direction and editorial line of the Monde diplo. The remaining 51% is owned by Le Monde.

== Controversies ==
=== Criticism ===
Jean-Marie Colombani, former editor of the daily Le Monde, was attributed by Le Monde diplomatique's former director general Bernard Cassen as saying: "Le Monde diplomatique is a journal of opinion; Le Monde is a journal of opinions."

=== Advertising ===
Although Le Monde diplomatique publishes few advertisements in order to retain its editorial independence, it has sometimes been criticised for the quantity and nature of the published advertisements In November and December 2003, two-page advertisements by IBM and a car manufacturer were placed. The issues of February and March 2004 contained advertisements by Microsoft in a "social" atmosphere with a picture of children, which led to agitation.

== Communication ==
On February 2, 1995, the newspaper became the first in France to have a presence on the internet.

The newspaper has the particularity of having very early on digitized on a single DVD-ROM, accessible for purchase, all the articles published in its edition in French since its foundation in 1954, German (same since 1995), English (same since 1996), Spanish (same since 1997), Italian (same since 1997) and Portuguese (same since 1999). Since then this voluminous archive has been converted into online access.

The monthly maintains an RSS feed and publishes on the social networks Facebook and Instagram.

== Meat Atlas ==
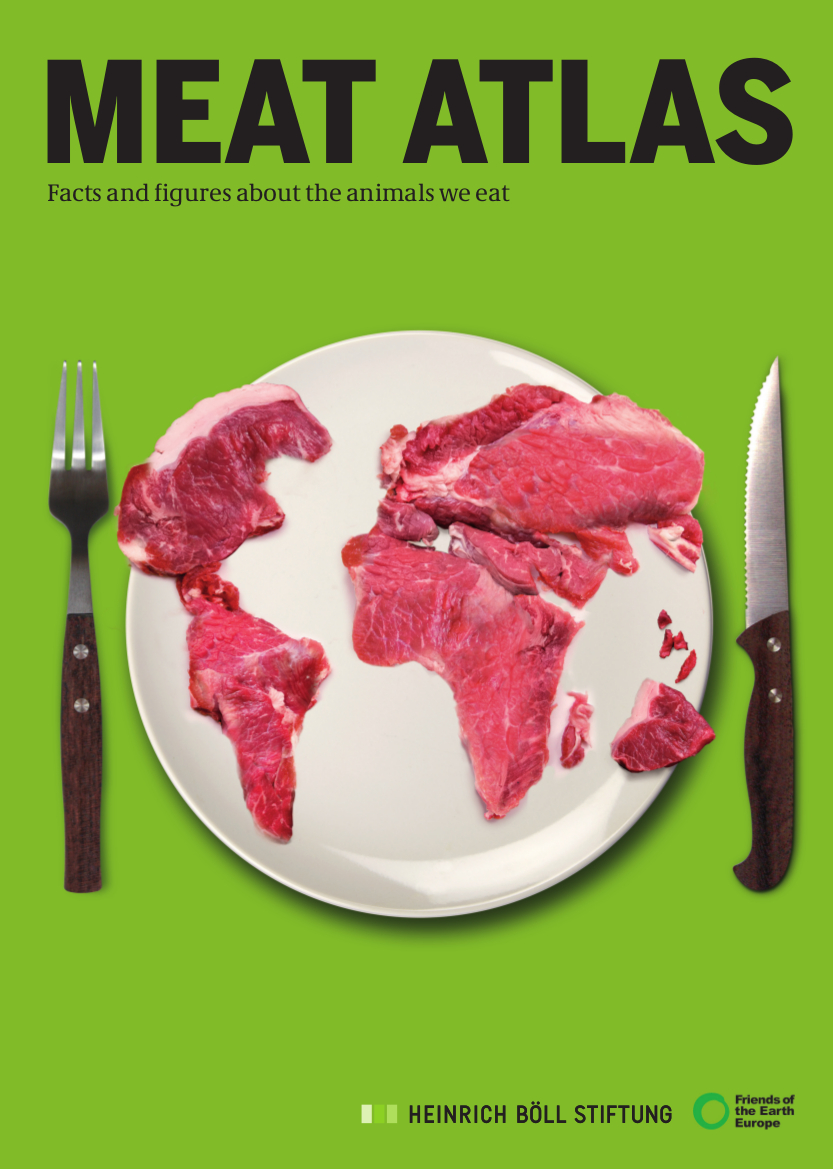
Le Monde diplomatique co-publishes Meat Atlas.

Le Monde diplomatique co-publishes Meat Atlas, which is an annual report on meat production and consumption.

== Overseas ==
The Friends of Le Monde diplomatique are a London-based society that promotes the English edition. It organises regular talks at The Gallery in Cowcross Street, Farringdon.

== See also ==
- Dominique Vidal
- Slow journalism
