= In Alaska =

- Directed by: Jaap van Heusden; Vinnie Karetak
- Written by: Jaap van Heusden; Vinnie Karetak
- Produced by: Marc Bary; Tyler Hagan
- Starring: Leo Matthew Temela; Noomi Rapace
- Cinematography: Martijn van Broekhuizen
- Edited by: Xander Nijsten
- Production companies: Experimental Forest Films; Rhombus Media; IJswater Films; Uuktumiaq Studios
- Distributed by: Elevation Pictures
- Release date: September 11, 2026 (TIFF)
- Running time: 108 minutes
- Countries: Canada; Netherlands
- Languages: English; Inuktitut

In Alaska is a Dutch-Canadian drama film, co-written and co-directed by Jaap van Heusden and Vinnie Karetak and released in 2026. The film stars Leo Matthew Temela as Woody, a young man from Alaska who becomes a fugitive from the law when he shoots a hole in the Trans-Alaska Pipeline System, escaping to Canada and reconnecting with his Inuk mother's roots in Nunavut.

The cast also includes Noomi Rapace, Yin Wang, Zorga Qaunaq, Miali Buscemi, Joanassie Aupaluk, Rogan Christopher, Gregory S. Csiszar, Carson A. Egan, Dominic Fox, Jeff Gladstone, Jake Guy, Jenna Hill, Maia Michaels, Jana Morrison, Chris Hextal, Sean Owen Roberts, Meg Roe and Christopher Rosamond in supporting roles.

The film entered casting in fall 2024. Filming began in Iqaluit in March 2025, and continued in British Columbia in the fall.

The film premiered at the 2026 Toronto International Film Festival.
