= Amélie Hardy =

Canadian documentary filmmaker

Amélie Hardy is a Canadian documentary filmmaker from Quebec. She is most noted for her 2022 film About Memory and Loss (Notes sur la mémoire et l'oubli), which was the winner of the Prix Iris for Best Short Documentary at the 25th Quebec Cinema Awards in 2023, and her 2024 film Hello Stranger, which won the Canadian Screen Award for Best Short Documentary at the 13th Canadian Screen Awards in 2025.

A graduate of the Université du Québec à Montréal, she has also directed the short documentary films Train Hopper and Happy Life (La vie heureuse), and the television documentaries Chroniques de la vie ordinaire and Virage vert : les règles du jeu.

Hello Stranger was released in 2024. It was the winner of the Canadian ShortWork at the 2024 Whistler Film Festival, and was shortlisted for the College Prize for Quebec Cinema (Prix collégial du cinéma québécois) in 2025.

== Filmography ==
- Train Hopper - 2019
- Happy Life (La vie heureuse) - 2021
- About Memory and Loss (Notes sur la mémoire et l'oubli) - 2022
- Chroniques de la vie ordinaire - 2022
- Hello Stranger - 2024
- Virage vert: les règles du jeu - 2024
- Make Money, Find Meaning, Don't Panic (Comment devenir riche, épanoui et détendu) - 2025
- A Wolf in the Suburbs - 2026
