= Vinnie Karetak =

Inuk actor and filmmaker

- Karetak in 2026

Vinnie Karetak, sometimes also credited as Vincent Karetak, is an Inuk actor and filmmaker from Arviat, Nunavut, best known for his television roles as Nipangi Huittuq in Qanurli and Jeffrey in North of North.

He has also had small roles in the films Two Lovers and a Bear and The Grizzlies, and the television series The Terror and Acting Good, as well as voice roles in Anaana's Tent and Ukaliq and Kalla. With his Qanurli co-star Thomas Anguti Johnston, he has also cohosted the Inuit Broadcasting Corporation public affairs talk show Qanuq Isumavit, and he was one of the creators of the touring theatrical show Kiviuq Returns.

Karetak and Jaap van Heusden co-wrote and co-directed the drama film In Alaska, which premiered at the 2026 Toronto International Film Festival.
