= Sean Menard =

Canadian documentary filmmaker

- Menard in 2026
- Born: 1984 (age 41–42)
- Occupation: Documentary filmmaker
- Notable work: The Carter Effect
- Website: www.seanmenard.com

Sean Menard (born 1984) is a Canadian documentary filmmaker from Hamilton, Ontario.

== Background ==
A graduate of Sir Allan MacNab Secondary School, in 2009, he was a finalist in The Score's Gillette Drafted: The Search for Canada's Next Sportscaster contest, but ultimately lost to Paul Brothers.

He subsequently concentrated on making documentary feature segments and specials for sports networks. He became most noted for his 2015 Montreal Expos documentary The Perfect Storm, which received a Canadian Screen Award nomination for Best Sports Program or Series at the 4th Canadian Screen Awards in 2016.

== Feature films ==
His 2016 feature documentary debut, Fight Mom, profiled mixed martial artist Michelle Waterson-Gomez, but was almost entirely self-funded and received only limited commercial distribution.

He received more widespread attention with his 2017 film The Carter Effect, a profile of NBA star Vince Carter which premiered at the 2017 Toronto International Film Festival.

His 2023 film 299 Queen Street West, a profile of the history of MuchMusic, premiered at the 2023 South by Southwest Film & TV Festival, and subsequently had its Canadian premiere at Roy Thomson Hall in Toronto in September 2023, followed by a screening tour of several other Canadian cities. The film was slated to premiere on Crave in 2024, but ran into issues with music licensing over video clips used in the film.

His film Run Terry Run received an advance preview screening at Roy Thomson Hall in 2025, with the Toronto Symphony Orchestra playing the score live. It went into wider release in October 2026, following a gala screening at the 2026 Toronto International Film Festival.

Also in 2025, his documentary series The Sneaker Boom, about the 1990s explosion in the popularity of athletic sneakers, premiered on Crave.

== Filmography ==
=== Film ===
- Fight Mom - 2016
- The Carter Effect - 2017
- 299 Queen Street West - 2023
- Run Terry Run - 2025

=== Television ===
- Rite of Passage - 2013
- Exceptional Status - 2013
- Connor McDavid: Transitions, Part 1 - 2014
- Connor McDavid: Transitions, Part 2 - 2015
- The Perfect Storm - 2015
- RBC Training Ground - 2016
- The Greatest Cuban Baseball Player You've Never Heard Of - 2016
- On the Line - 2016
- UFC 25 Years in Short - 2018
- Sole Origins - 2018
- The Sneaker Boom - 2025
