= Ian Keteku =

Canadian poet, musician and journalist

- Born: December 20, 1983 (age 42); Accra, Ghana
- Citizenship: Canadian
- Education: York University
- Occupations: Poet, spoken word artist, educator
- Years active: 2000s–present
- Known for: World Poetry Slam Champion (2010)
- Notable work: Black Abacus, The Sum of Small Parts
- Awards: World Poetry Slam Champion (2010)

Ian Keteku is a poet, musician and freelance journalist. Born as Ian Nana Yaw Adu Budu Keteku, his birth name mimics his diverse talents and interests. Raised in Canada and of Ghanaian heritage, Keteku earned the title of World Slam Poetry champion in France in the summer of 2010.

== Poet ==
Keteku has described his poetry as “critical oratory,” focusing on themes that he considers under-examined in public discourse. His work addresses topics such as peace, social awareness, and critical reflection. He has performed poetry and music internationally. His artistic practice emphasizes the use of language to examine aspects of the human condition and interconnectedness.

Keteku conducts poetry, writing, and performance workshops for students of all ages and various community groups, inspiring people to accept the power of their own voice. He is also a mentor to other experienced and budding poets. Keteku coached the 2013 Toronto poetry slam team to a national victory, and IF, a Toronto-based poet to the 2014 individual national victory.

The Calgary born Keteku was raised by Ghanaian parents; this upbringing heavily influences his art. His work follows in the lineage of ancient African storytellers by paying homage to the past and revisiting themes and lessons from previous generations. In addition, Keteku is a devout practitioner of Afrofuturism.

Keteku has been cited for his contributions to humanitarian public forums. He is also a video artist who has directed and produced several poetic films, which have been screened internationally.

== Journalist ==
He has been featured in the Calgary Herald, Fast Forward Magazine, and Edmonton Journal, CBC television, CBC radio, RCI, and a number of campus radio stations across the nation. But his use of words to tell stories does not end there. As a freelancer, Keteku has written for the Ottawa Citizen, Calgary Herald, Toronto Star, The Globe and Mail, and others.

Through video journalism Keteku has produced stories for CBC Calgary, CJTV News and i-Channel, where he covered the victory of Barack Obama in Chicago.

== Musician ==
In 2004 Keteku under the moniker Emcee E released his debut album, Iantrospective. Positive bound lyrics combined with philosophical undertones created a stir in the Edmonton hip-hop arena. Songs such as "My Story" which illustrated the need to begin the global peace process and "Fashion Passion" which shows the danger of our obsession with material wealth set the tone for the whole album.

In September 2011, Ian Keteku released his first spoken word album L.F.P.E. Lessons From Planet Earth (Re-Evolution).

Most recently in February 2015, Keteku released Love and Lumumba, his sophomore spoken-word album. Love and Lumumba is a narrative soundscape of spoken-word poetry caressed by future-beat electronic melodies. Themes of revolution, race, lust, and loss are all explored throughout the album. The sound is a genre-bending amalgamation of down-tempo instrumentals with thought-provoking lyrics. The genre of sound is called "Poetronica" (Poetry + Electronica).

== Film ==
In 2026 Keteku and Bogdan Anifrani-Fedach collaborated on the animated short film To Our Future Ancestors (À nos futurs ancêtres).
