= Jaap van Heusden =

Dutch film director

- van Heusden in 2026
- Born: 1979 (age 46–47); Utrecht, Netherlands
- Occupation: Film director

Jaap van Heusden (born 1979) is a Dutch film director. In 2018, he won the Golden Calf for Best Director award for the film In Blue.

== Filmography ==
| Year | Film | Director | Writer | Notes | Ref. |
|---|---|---|---|---|---|
| 2005 | Een ingewikkeld verhaal, eenvoudig verteld | Yes | No | Short film | |
| 2006 | Le griot de Daporé | Yes | Yes | Short film | |
| 2006 | Parparim | Yes | No | Short film | |
| 2006 | Every Picture Tells a Story - Anderman | Yes | Yes | Short documentary | |
| 2008 | One Night Stand III - Ooit | Yes | No | Short TV drama | |
| 2009 | I love het leger | Yes | No | Documentary | |
| 2010 | Win/Win | Yes | Yes | Feature film | |
| 2011 | Duivelse dilemma's - Drone | Yes | Yes | Television drama | |
| 2012 | Duivelse dilemma's - Het offer | Yes | No | Television drama | |
| 2013 | De nieuwe wereld | Yes | Yes | Television film | |
| 2014 | De verloren zoon | Yes | Yes | Television drama | |
| 2017 | In Blue | Yes | Yes | Feature film | |
| 2017 | Teledoc Campus - a•sy•lum | Yes | Yes | Short documentary | |
| 2018 | Het Laatste Verhoor | Yes | No | Television drama | |
| 2022 | Blauw licht - Herinneringen van een ambulancebroeder | Yes | No | Short documentary | |
| 2023 | De Man Uit Rome | Yes | Yes | Feature film | |
| 2023 | Teledoc Campus - Het wonder van Oirsbeek | Yes | No | Short documentary | |
| 2026 | In Alaska | Yes | Yes | with Vinnie Karetak | |
