= List of people from Hamilton, Ontario =

The following people were born in, residents of, or otherwise closely connected to the city of Hamilton, Ontario.

== Arts ==
=== Architecture and design ===
- James Balfour (1854–1917), architect; works include Canada Life Assurance Company building at corner of King & James (1883), City Hall on corner of James & York (1888)
- Bruce Kuwabara (1949– ), architect; works include Kitchener City Hall and Art Gallery of Ontario Phase III
- John M. Lyle (1872–1945), architect in the late 19th century; works include New York Public Library Main Branch (1897–1911), Royal Alexandra Theatre in Toronto (1907), Union Station (Toronto) (1914–1921)

=== Craft ===
- Lois Betteridge (1928–2020), silversmith, goldsmith, designer and educator

=== Dance ===
- Frank Augustyn (1953– ), principal dancer with the National Ballet of Canada 1972–1989
- Karen Kain (1951– ), principal dancer and later artistic director (2005–2021) of the National Ballet of Canada

=== Film and television ===
Julia Arthur

- Jean Adair (1873–1953), actress; worked primarily on stage (sometimes billed as Jennet Adair); made several film appearances late in her career, most notably as one of the misguided murdering aunts of Cary Grant in Arsenic and Old Lace
- Nicole Arbour, comedian
- Julia Arthur (1868–1950), stage and film actress
- Robert Beatty (1909–1992), actor who worked in radio, film and television for most of his career and was especially known in the United Kingdom
- Alan Best (1959– ), animation director and producer; began his career as an assistant animator working for Hanna-Barbera studios; also worked on the animated features Heavy Metal (1981) and Pink Floyd The Wall (1982)
- Kylie Bunbury (born 1989), actress
- Rick Campanelli (1970– ), MuchMusic video jockey, currently works for ET Canada
- Wendy Crewson (1956– ), actress
- Douglass Dumbrille (1889–1974), actor and Canadian pioneer in early Hollywood
- Jesse Ewles (1981– ), indie film director, writer, creator of music videos for of Montreal, Kathryn Calder, and Grizzly Bear
- Rob Faulds (1955– ), Canadian sports analyst on Rogers Sportsnet and host of sportsnetnews
- Angela Featherstone (born 1965), actress, writer and teacher
- Jonathan Frid (1924–2012), theater, television and movie actor, known for the role of the vampire Barnabas Collins on the first incarnation of the Gothic TV serial Dark Shadows
- Daniel Goldberg (1948/49–2023), film producer (Space Jam); worked with Ivan Reitman on Stripes and Meatballs
- Harris Goldberg, film director, writer, and producer
- Currie Graham (1967– ), stage, film and television actor, known for playing Lt. Thomas Bale on the TV program NYPD Blue
- Graham Greene (1952–2025), TV and movie actor; born on Six Nations reserve and lived in Hamilton as a young adult; appeared in The Green Mile, on the Red Green Show, L.A. Law and The New Beachcombers
- Jonathan Hale (1892–1966), actor, known as Mr. Dithers in the Blondie movies; committed suicide in Hollywood at age 74
- Adam J. Harrington (1972– ), actor and producer; known for his roles in The Secret Circle, Queer As Folk and Dexter, and as Roy Earle in the video game L.A. Noire
- Trevor Jimenez, animator (Weekends)
- Jason Jones, senior correspondent for The Daily Show with Jon Stewart
- Stana Katic (1978– ), actress, known for her portrayal of Detective Kate Beckett in ABC's Castle
- Luke Kirby (1978– ), actor (Mambo Italiano)

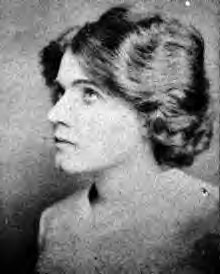
Florence Lawrence

- Florence Lawrence (1890–1938), inventor and silent film actress, often referred to as "the first movie star"; also known as "the Biograph Girl" and "the Girl of a Thousand Faces"; appeared in more than 270 films for various motion picture companies
- Chris Lazar (1986– ), actor, known for his role as Young Zach on the series Dark Angel
- Ashley Leggat (1986– ), actress, known for her role as "Casey" in the Disney Channel series Life with Derek
- Eugene Levy (1946– ), actor and writer, known for SCTV, Schitt's Creek and the American Pie film series
- Brian Linehan (1944–2004), television host; known for his celebrity interviews on City Lights produced by Citytv in Toronto
- Del Lord (1894–1970), film director and actor; known as a director of Three Stooges films (Grimsby)
- Patrick McKenna (1960– ), comedic and dramatic actor; known for the television series The Red Green Show and Traders, and the Trudeau miniseries
- Sean Menard, documentary filmmaker (The Carter Effect, 299 Queen Street West, Run Terry Run)
- Blake Moynes, winner of the seventeenth season of reality television series The Bachelorette
- Kathleen Munroe (born 1982), actress
- Erin Pitt (born 1999), actress
- Paul Popowich (1973– ), actor; beside his theatre appearances, has performed in many television series (Beverly Hills, 90210) and features
- Frank Powell, stage and silent film actor, screenwriter, and director in the United States
- Leon Pownall (1943–2006), actor and director
- Ivan Reitman (1946–2022), Slovak-born, Canadian-raised film actor, producer, and director; most remembered for directing and producing a string of comedies, mostly in the 1980s and 1990s (Meatballs, Stripes and Ghostbusters); a founder of the McMaster Film Board at McMaster University
- Rick Roberts, actor
- Kathleen Robertson (1973– ), actress, Beverly Hills, 90210
- Inanna Sarkis, actress
- Martin Short (1950– ), actor, writer, and producer best known for his comedy work, particularly on the TV programs SCTV and Saturday Night Live
- Floria Sigismondi (1965– ), director (born in Pescara, Italy, raised in Hamilton)
- Steve Smith (1945– ), main actor and writer on television series The Red Green Show
- David Soren, animator
- Sarah Taylor, MuchMusic VJ who now co-hosts many popular shows, including Combat Zone, MuchOnDemand and Take Over
- Dave Thomas (1949– ), comedian and actor, SCTV, Grace Under Fire
- Nerene Virgin, Canadian actress, journalist, and teacher
- Brian Williams, sportscaster, known for his coverage of the Olympic Games (born in Winnipeg, raised in Hamilton)
- Dick Wilson (1916–2007), actor whose claim to fame was working for over 21 years on 504 Charmin toilet paper TV commercials; also made acting appearances on Bewitched, Hogan's Heroes and The Bob Newhart Show
- Gordon Michael Woolvett (1970– ), actor, played Seamus Harper on TV's Andromeda
- Dominic Zamprogna (1979– ), actor, played James "Jammer" Lyman on TV's Battlestar Galactica
- Gema Zamprogna (1976– ), actress, played Felicity King on Road to Avonlea (1989–1996)

=== Fine arts ===
- Lida Baday (1957– ), fashion designer
- Blaine (1937–2012), political cartoonist
- William Blair Bruce (1859–1906), painter
- Gino Cavicchioli (1957– ), official sculptor for the Canadian Football Hall of Fame
- Christian Cardell Corbet (1966– ), portrait sculptor
- Hortense Gordon (1886–1961), member of Toronto-based group Painters Eleven; works were exhibited in galleries in Europe and North America
- Elizabeth Bradford Holbrook (1913–2009), portrait sculptor; founder of the Canadian Portrait Academy and Canadian Group of Artists; her career spanned over seventy-five years; principal works include eight stone sculpture panels on the former Federal Building
- Mark Lewis (1958– ), photographer and installation artist who represented Canada at the 2009 Venice Biennale
- Graeme MacKay (1968– ), editorial cartoonist
- Win Mortimer (1919–1998), comic book and comic strip artist, one of the major illustrators of the DC Comics superheroes Superman, Superboy, and Batman
- Frank Panabaker (1904–1992), painter
- Dave Sim (1956– ), comic book writer and artist; creator of Cerebus
- Paul Szep (1941– ), editorial cartoonist; two-time Pulitzer Prize winner

=== Illusionists ===
- Greg Frewin (1967– ), illusionist and "World Champion of Magic"

=== Journalism and writing ===
- Roy Adams, author, newspaper columnist, human rights activist and academic
- Barbara Amiel, British-Canadian journalist, writer, socialite; wife of Conrad Black
- Gordon Stewart Anderson, author
- Dick Beddoes (1925–1991), former sports journalist for CHCH-TV in Hamilton, the Vancouver Sun, The Globe and Mail (Toronto), and CFRB radio (Toronto); author
- Stephen Brunt, lead sports columnist for The Globe and Mail since 1989
- John H. Bryden (1943– ), politician, journalist, historian
- Richard Butler (1834–1925), editor, publisher, journalist; the Butler neighbourhood in Hamilton is named after him
- Jojo Chintoh (1944– ), retired television reporter (Citytv)
- Jane Christmas (b 1954), writer
- Trevor Cole, newspaper and magazine columnist, novelist
- Hugh Cook (1942– ), novelist
- Damien Cox, sports columnist for the Toronto Star
- Sylvia Fraser (1935– ), novelist and travel writer
- Lawrence Hill, author (The Book of Negroes)
- Wentworth M. Johnson (1939–2014), author
- Robert Kirkland Kernighan (1854–1926), poet, journalist; the Kernighan neighbourhood on Hamilton Mountain is named after him
- Gary Lautens (1928–1992), humorist and newspaper columnist; wrote for the Toronto Star from 1962 until his death
- Mark Leslie (1969– ), writer, author of Haunted Hamilton: The Ghosts of Dundurn Castle & Other Steeltown Shivers
- Billie Livingston (1965– ), novelist and poet
- David Macfarlane (1952– ), journalist, playwright and novelist
- Emily Maitlis (1970– ), British journalist; born in Hamilton whilst her father was teaching at McMaster University
- Dan McLean (1947–2026), journalist and news anchor (CHCH-TV)
- Ivan Miller (1898–1967), Canadian journalist and sportscaster who worked 45 years for The Hamilton Spectator
- Steve Paikin (1960– ), journalist, film producer and author, known for hosting TV Ontario's newsmagazines Studio 2 and Diplomatic Immunity
- John Lawrence Reynolds (1939– ), novelist and non-fiction writer, twice winner of the Arthur Ellis Award
- Melville Marks Robinson (1888– ), founder of the Commonwealth Games
- Doug Saunders (1967– ), journalist, European Bureau Chief for The Globe and Mail
- James Travers, journalist
- Clementina (Fessenden) Trenholme (1844–1918), author, social organizer, and mother of radio pioneer Reginald Fessenden; the Trenholme and Fessenden neighbourhoods on Hamilton Mountain were named after her
- Anuja Varghese, writer
- David Vienneau (1951–2004), journalist who moved to television in 1998 as Ottawa bureau chief at for Global Television, where he remained until his death from pancreatic cancer
- Harriett Annie Wilkins (1829–1888), poet

=== Music ===
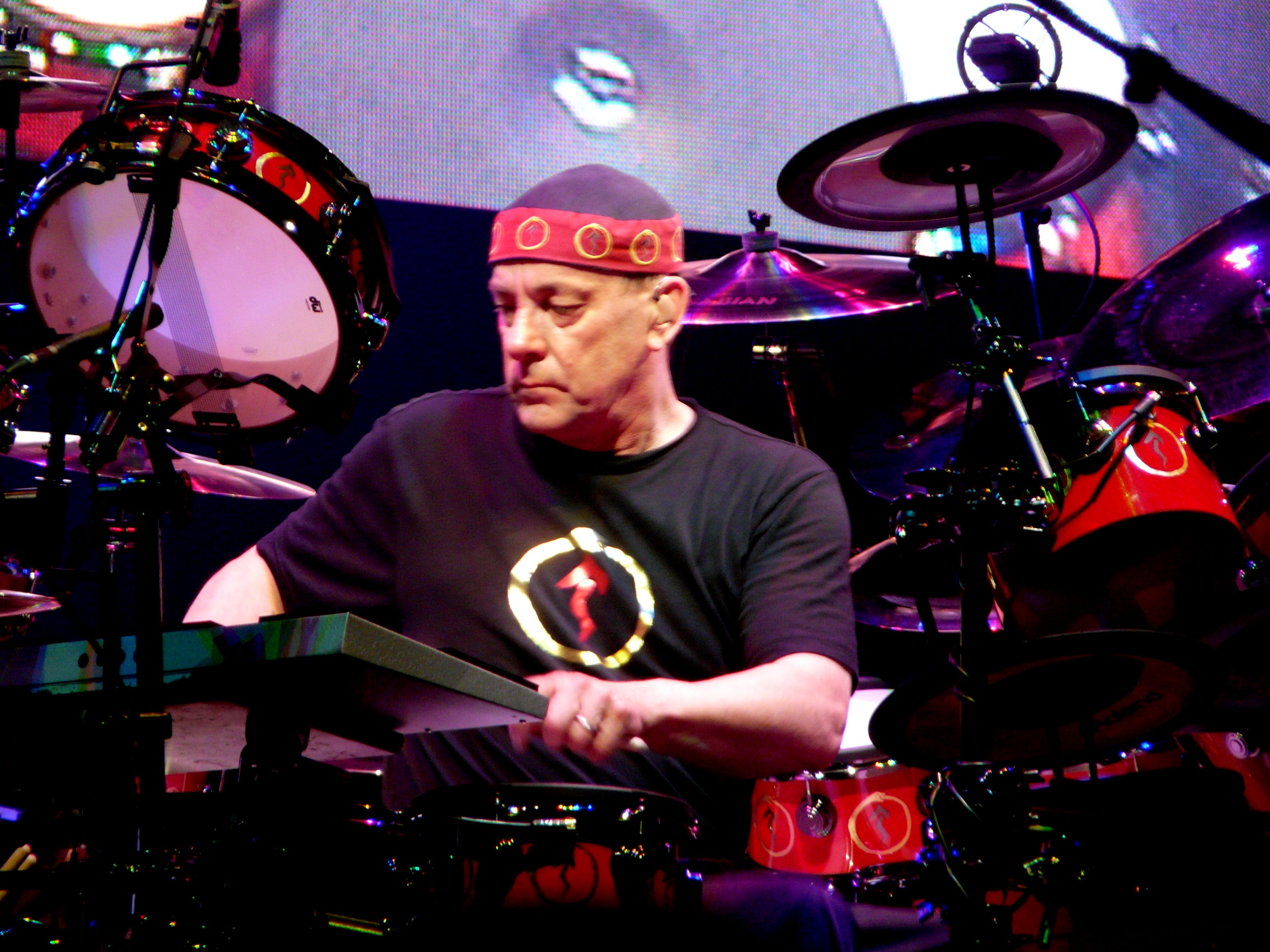
Neil Peart

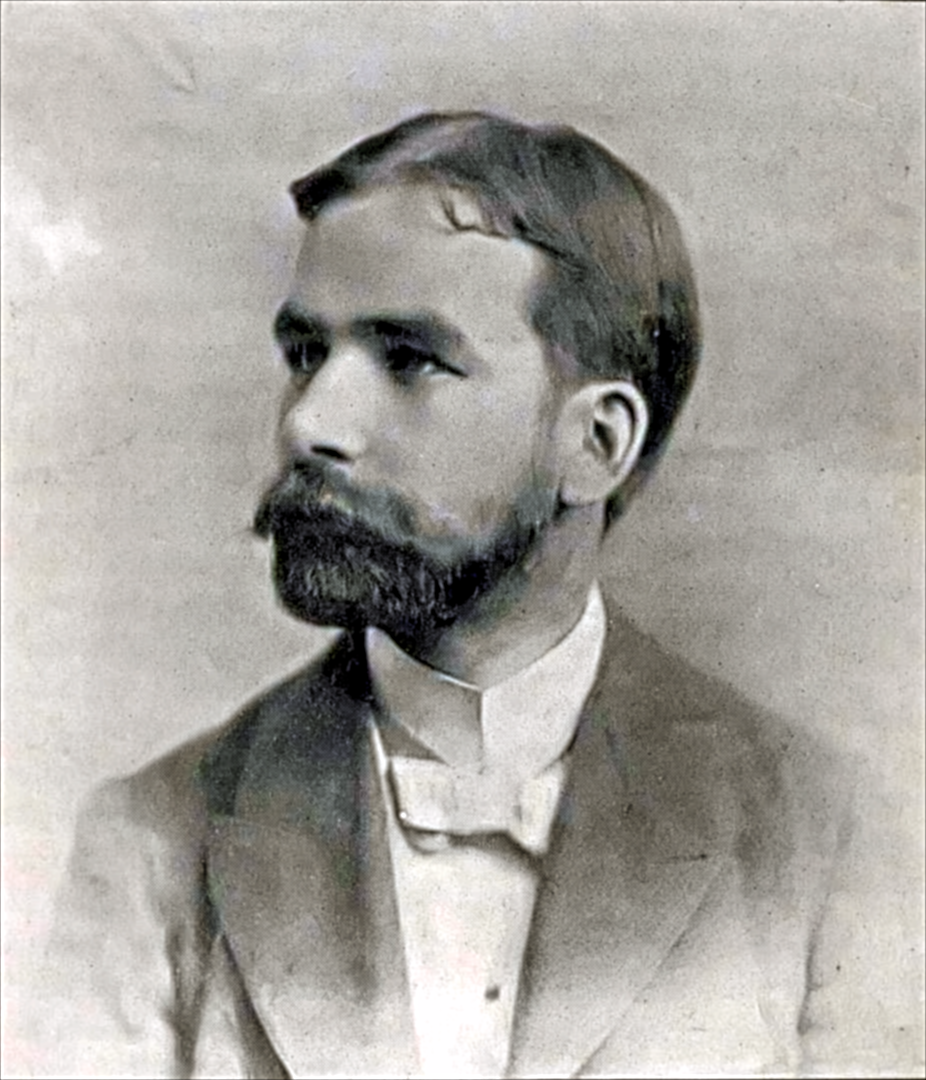
Robert Stanley Weir

- Nicole Appleton (1974– ), singer; born in Hamilton but raised in Toronto; one of two Canadian members of the British pop group All Saints, which disbanded in 2001; she and her sister Natalie later formed a second British-based pop group named Appleton
- Ian Astbury, singer (The Cult), spent teen years in Hamilton
- David Braid (1975– ), composer and pianist
- Boris Brott (1944–2022), once an assistant to Leonard Bernstein, he led the Hamilton Philharmonic Orchestra for 21 years, later creating the Brott Music Festival and National Academy Orchestra
- David Byrne (1952– ), singer-songwriter, guitarist (Talking Heads); lived in Hamilton as a child
- Rita Chiarelli, blues singer
- Colin Cripps (1961– ), musician and record producer
- Eria Fachin (1960–1996), pop singer
- Jeremy Greenspan (1979– ), electronic pop musician best known for Junior Boys
- Sonny Greenwich (1936– ), jazz guitarist
- Jordan Hastings (1982– ), drummer for the post-hardcore band Alexisonfire, as well as The Black Lungs and former band Jersey, born in Hamilton but raised in Burlington
- Darcy Hepner, saxophonist, composer arranger
- Udo Kasemets (1919–2014), Estonian-born composer of orchestral, chamber, vocal, piano, and electroacoustic works
- Harrison Kennedy (1942– ), electric blues singer and guitarist, formerly part of Chairmen of the Board
- King Biscuit Boy (1944–2003), blues musician, member of Crowbar; the first Canadian blues artist to chart on Billboard in the U.S.; Rolling Stone magazine called him "legendary"; played with Muddy Waters, Joe Cocker, and Janis Joplin; his fans include Keith Richards and Paul McCartney
- Daniel Lanois (1951– ), solo artist, producer for U2, lived in Hamilton and recorded at Grant Avenue Studios
- Jessy Lanza, pop/electronic musician
- Gord Lewis (1956/1957–2002), guitarist for Teenage Head
- Ray Lyell (1962– ), singer, songwriter, and guitarist
- Wade MacNeil (1984– ), guitarist and vocalist for the post-hardcore band Alexisonfire and frontman of The Black Lungs
- Brian Melo, winner of Canadian Idol (season five); previously a construction worker
- Haydain Neale (1970–2009), musician (jacksoul)
- Steve Negus, Saga drummer and record producer
- Neil Peart (1952–2020), drummer and lyricist for the progressive rock band Rush
- Skip Prokop (1946–2017), drummer and bandleader for Lighthouse and The Paupers; worked with Cass Elliot, Janis Joplin, Al Kooper and Carlos Santana
- Stan Rogers (1949–1983), folk singer
- Brenda Russell (1949– ), American-born singer-songwriter and keyboardist who lived in Hamilton; known for her eclectic musical style; her genres include pop, soul, jazz and adult contemporary; has worked with Stevie Wonder, Aretha Franklin and Sting
- Lorraine Segato, lead vocalist for 1980s new wave music group Parachute Club, noted for the song "Rise Up"
- Ernest Seitz (1892–1978), composer, songwriter, pianist and music educator
- Dan Snaith (1979– ), musician for the bands Caribou, Manitoba and Daphni, born in Dundas
- Tomi Swick, singer-songwriter
- Christian Tanna, drummer and songwriter for I Mother Earth
- Jagori Tanna, guitar player for I Mother Earth
- Ian Thomas (1950– ), singer-songwriter known for the 1973 hit "Painted Ladies"; brother of Dave Thomas
- Alan Walker (1930– ), English-Canadian radio producer, musicologist and academic best known as a biographer and scholar of composer Franz Liszt
- Jackie Washington (1919–2009), blues singer
- Robert Stanley Weir (1856–1926), lawyer, poet, author, best remembered as the author of the English lyrics to "O Canada"
- Simon Wilcox (1976– ), songwriter based in Los Angeles
- Tom Wilson, rock musician

=== Pageantry ===
- Leanne Baird, Miss Canada International in 1998

=== Radio ===
- Richard Alway, former radio broadcast commentator, current and first lay president and vice-chancellor of the University of St. Michael's College
- Bob Bratina, radio personality, elected MP for Hamilton East-Stoney Creek, former city councillor for Downtown Ward 2 and mayor of Hamilton
- Roy Green, staple of the Hamilton radio scene
- Sue Prestedge, sports broadcaster, one of Canada's first and most influential female sports journalists; coordinator of the Advanced Journalism program at Mohawk College

=== Theatre ===
- Nick Cordero (1978–2020), Broadway actor
- Diane Dupuy, founder of the Famous People Players in 1974, a professional black light theatre company that combines music with characters that pay tribute to the music and artistry of famous people; the group was discovered by Liberace, who took them to Las Vegas to perform; they have been performing around the world ever since
- Sky Gilbert (1952– ), artistic director, actor, academic and drag performer; opened the Hammertheatre Company in January 2007 in Hamilton; the theatre is devoted to Gilbert's plays, which deal with issues of gender and sexuality
- Caissie Levy (1981– ), Broadway and West End actor, known for roles in Frozen, Wicked, Hair, Ragtime

== Business ==
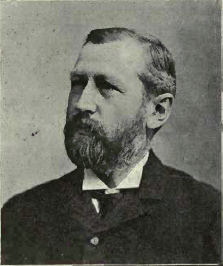
E. D. Smith

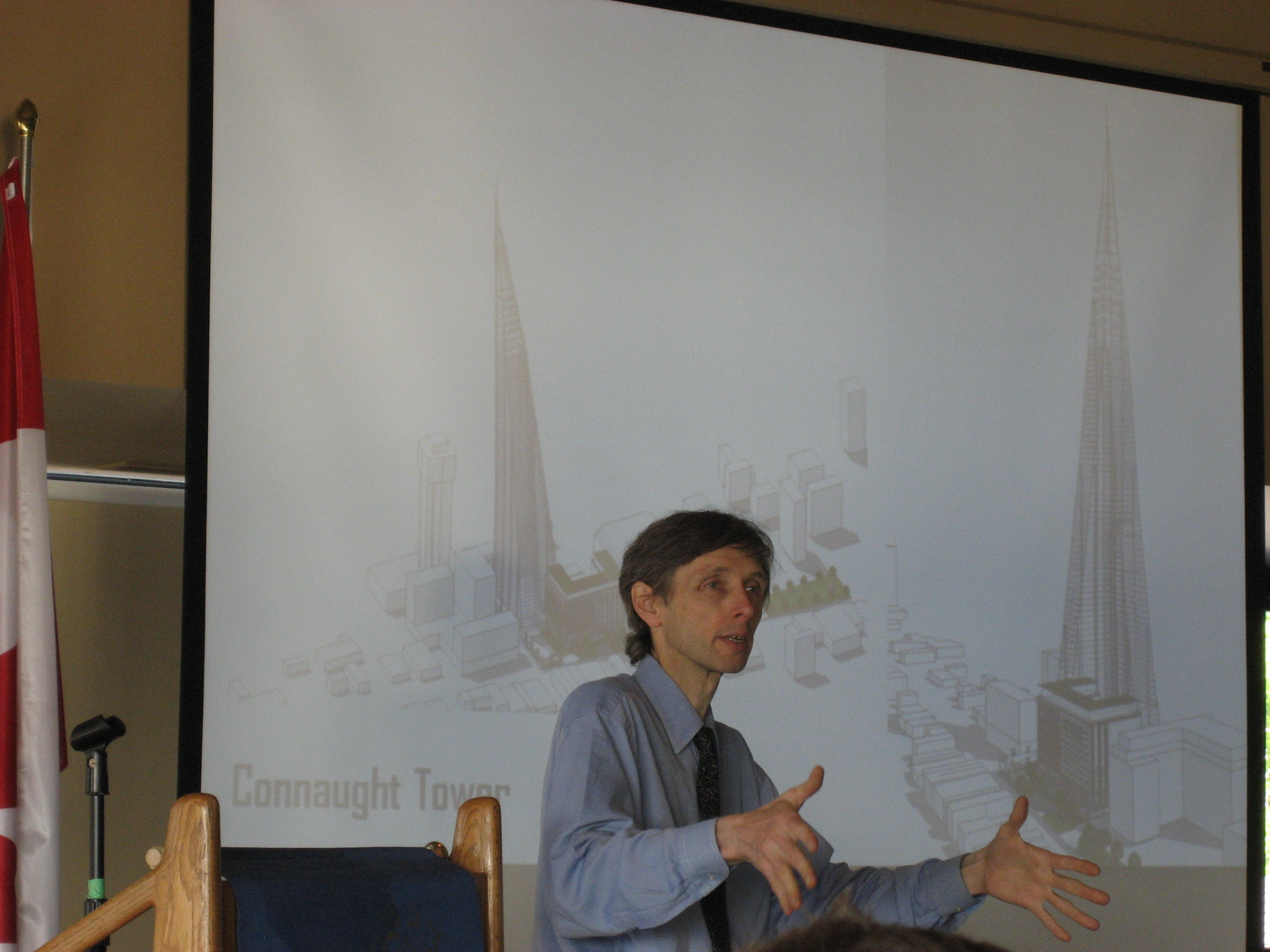
Harry Stinson

- Aris Alexanian (1901–1961), founder of Alexanian Carpet and Flooring (born in what is now Turkey, moved to Hamilton in 1927)
- John Askin (1739–1815), fur trader, merchant and official in Upper Canada
- Hugh Cossart Baker, Sr. (1818–1859), banker, businessman, mathematician; established the first life insurance company in Canada (1847), the Canada Life Assurance Company
- Hugh Cossart Baker, Jr. (1846–1931), businessman, telephone pioneer
- Amanda Blain (born 1980), internet personality, business owner, web developer
- David Braley (1941–2020), CFL B.C. Lions owner since 1996–97, Hamilton businessman who owns Orlick Industries Limited
- Jack Kent Cooke (1912–1997), one of the most widely known executives in professional sports; at one time owned the NHL's Los Angeles Kings, the NBA's Los Angeles Lakers and the NFL's Washington Redskins
- James Crooks (1778–1860), Scottish-born businessman of Wentworth County and father of Adam Crooks; Crooks Street in Central Hamilton is named after him
- Michael DeGroote (1932–2022), billionaire, best known as a major private donor to McMaster University
- John Dickenson (1847–1932), contractor and political figure; one of the "Five Johns" of the Dominion Power and Transmission Company
- James Durand (1775–1833), businessman and political figure in Upper Canada
- Stephen Elop (1963– ), president & CEO of Nokia, the first non-Finnish director of the company
- John Fortino (1934–2011), founder of Fortinos Supermarkets
- Peter George (1941–2017), economist and university administrator, former president of McMaster University in Hamilton
- Peter Hess (1779–1855), farmer, landowner; Peter and Hess Streets in the city are named after him, and Caroline Street is named after one of his daughters
- Nathaniel Hughson (1755–1837), farmer and hotel owner; Loyalist who moved to Canada following the American Revolution; one of the city founders of Hamilton; Hughson Street is named after him
- Peter Hunter Hamilton (1800–1857), landowner and businessman; half brother of city founder George Hamilton; Hunter Street is named after him
- Edward Jackson (1799–1872), tinware manufacturer; Jackson Street is named after him
- James Jolley (1813–1892), saddler, harnessmaker, politician; funded construction of the Jolley Cut, a Mountain access road in Hamilton
- Theodore W. Jones (1853–1943) Canadian-born American businessman, politician; born in Hamilton
- Ron Joyce (1930–2019), founding partner of Tim Hortons
- Charles Juravinski (1929–2022), former owner of Flamboro Downs racetrack; donated $43 million to Hamilton city hospitals with his wife Margaret; Henderson Hospital on Concession Street was renamed to the Juravinski Hospital and Juravinski Cancer Centre
- Syd Kessler (1949–2021), businessperson and jingle writer
- Michael Lee-Chin (1951– ), CEO of AIC Diversified Canada Split Corp. and the National Commercial Bank of Jamaica
- John Moodie Jr. (1859–1944), textile manufacturer; drove the first automobile in Canada in 1898, a one-cylinder Winton he imported from Cleveland, Ohio
- Gordon Osbaldeston (1930–2019), former civil servant; in 1981 he was made an Officer of the Order of Canada and was promoted to Companion in 1997
- Joseph Pigott, head of a family construction business that built Hamilton landmarks including City Hall, the Pigott Building, Copps Coliseum and Christ the King Cathedral
- Andrew Ross (1857–1941), businessman; lent his support to the building of the Tivoli theatre and to the Barton Street Arena; was involved in professional hockey (Hamilton Tigers) and softball
- William Rymal (1759–1852), farmer and one of the earliest settlers on the Hamilton Mountain; Rymal Road is named after him
- E. D. Smith (1853–1948), businessman and politician who founded a food company that bears his name
- Ken Soble, founder of CHCH-TV, leader of Hamilton's urban renewal movement, and owner of CHML radio
- William Southam (1843–1932), once an apprentice printer at the London Free Press; at age 34 he purchased the troubled Hamilton Spectator, turned it around and made it the flagship of a national newspaper chain
- Harry Stinson (1953– ), real estate developer and president of Stinson Properties; called Toronto's "condo king"; now resides in Hamilton
- Thomas Stinson (1798–1864), merchant, banker, landowner; an extensive landowner in not only in Hamilton but also Chicago, St. Paul, Minnesota, and Superior City, Wisconsin, which he named
- George Elias Tuckett (1835–1900), Tuckett Tobacco Company owner and Hamilton's 27th mayor in 1896
- Bob Young, founder of Red Hat 1996, started a self-publishing website that claims to be the world's fastest-growing provider of print-on-demand books (www.lulu.com); currently owns the Hamilton Tiger Cats of the CFL (Ancaster)
- Joyce Young, philanthropist

== Education ==
- Adelaide Hoodless (1858–1910), educational reformer who inspired the founders of the international women's organization known as the Women's Institutes in 1897
- Janet Lee (1862–1940), education reformer who co-founded the international women's organization known as the Women's Institutes (WI) in 1897, and wrote its constitution and by-laws
- Glynn Leyshon (1929–2018), wrestler and university professor
- Ivor Wynne (1918–1970), educator and university administrator who was the director of athletics at McMaster University

== Law ==
=== Crime ===
- Johnson Aziga (1956– ), first person charged with first-degree murder in Canada for spreading the HIV virus, after two women whom he had infected without their knowledge died
- Evelyn Dick (1920–), committed infanticide and was convicted, then acquitted, of having murdered her husband
- Giacomo Luppino (1900–1987), mobster of the Hamilton-based Luppino crime family
- Angelo Musitano (1978–2017), mobster of the Hamilton-based Musitano crime family
- Pat Musitano (1968–2020), mobster of the Hamilton-based Musitano crime family
- Johnny Papalia (1924–1997), mobster of the Hamilton-based Papalia crime family
- Rocco Perri (1887–disappeared 1944), gangster
- Cathy Smith (1947–2020), singer; convicted of manslaughter in death of John Belushi, co-authored the book Chasing the Dragon about her life experience with drugs (1984)

=== Judges and lawyers ===
William W. Cooke

- Charles William Bell (1876–1938), playwright, politician and Rocco Perri's lawyer
- Alan Borovoy (1932–2015), lawyer and human rights activist
- Harvey Brownstone (1956– ), judge of the Ontario Court of Justice
- Richard Hatt (1769–1819), businessman, judge and political figure in Upper Canada
- Helen Kinnear (1894–1970), lawyer, first federally appointed woman judge in Canada
- Helen Gregory MacGill (1864–1947), first woman in British Columbia to be appointed a judge of the juvenile court, a post she held for 23 years
- Jack Pelech (1934– ), litigation and business lawyer, Hamilton Citizen of the Year, 1987; Order of Canada, 2006
- John Sopinka (1933–1997), Supreme Court justice described as the heart of the court; raised in north Hamilton and died unexpectedly; namesake of Hamilton's courthouse and the Sopinka Cup, a law student advocacy competition
- John Willson (1776–1860), judge and political figure in Upper Canada

== Military ==
- Nathan Cirillo (1990–2014), Corporal of the Argyll and Sutherland Highlanders of Canada; slain while on ceremonial guard duty at the National War Memorial during the 2014 shootings at Parliament Hill, Ottawa
- William W. Cooke (1846–1876), military officer in the United States Army during the American Civil War and the Black Hills War; adjutant for George Armstrong Custer and was killed during the Battle of the Little Bighorn; buried in Hamilton Cemetery
- Harry Crerar (1888–1965), commander of the First Canadian Army in the Second World War
- John Weir Foote (1904–1988), military chaplain and Ontario cabinet minister, Canadian recipient of the Victoria Cross; the James Street Armoury where the RHLI is now based, along with 11th Field Hamilton-Wentworth Battery, was renamed the John W. Foote VC Armoury in his memory
- Billy Green (1794–1877), otherwise known as "The Scout", key to the Anglo-Canadian victory at the Battle of Stoney Creek
- Robert Land (1736–1818), veteran of the American Revolution and one of Hamilton's founding citizens; Robert Land Academy, Canada's only military pre-university private school, was named in his honour
- Ben Lear (1879–1966), Olympic bronze medal winner, United States Army World War II-era general
- Sydney Chilton Mewburn (1863–1956), lawyer and politician; Minister of Militia and Defence 1917–1920 under Sir Robert Borden's Union Government in 1917
- Harold A. Rogers (1899–1994), founder of Kin Canada (formerly the Kinsmen and Kinette Clubs of Canada), a non-profit service organization that promotes service, fellowship, positive values, and national pride
- John Vincent (1764–1848), British army officer in the Battle of Stoney Creek, War of 1812

== Politics ==
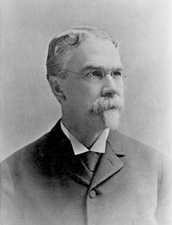
James McMillan

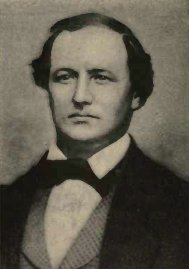
Colin Campbell Ferrie

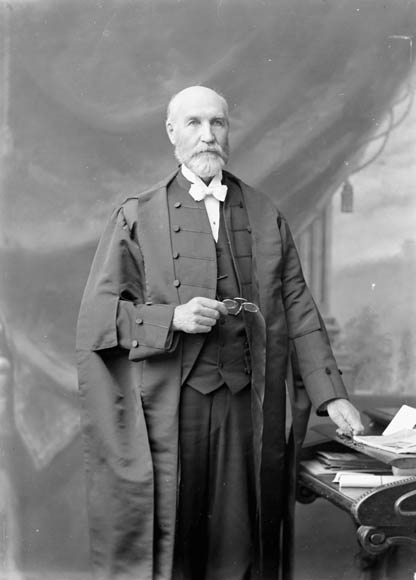
Thomas Bain

- Dominic Agostino (1959–2004), member of Provincial Parliament of Ontario for Hamilton East from 1995 until his death in 2004; the first Liberal MPP in that riding since 1967
- Lincoln Alexander (1922–2012), the 24th lieutenant governor of Ontario 1985–1991 and former governor of the Canadian Unity Council; became Canada's first black member of Parliament when he was elected to the House of Commons of Canada in 1968 as a member of the Progressive Conservative Party of Canada; an expressway on Hamilton Mountain was named the Lincoln Alexander Parkway in his honour
- Thomas Bain (1834–1915), speaker of the House of Commons
- Richard Beasley (1761–1842), soldier, political figure, farmer and businessman in Upper Canada
- Marie Bountrogianni (1956– ), Ed.D., former member of the Legislative Assembly of Ontario, and cabinet minister in the government of Liberal Premier Dalton McGuinty
- Brad Bradford (1986– ), Toronto city councillor, born in Ancaster
- Isaac Buchanan (1810–1883), businessman and political figure in Canada West
- Sarmite Bulte (1953– ), Latvian-Canadian lawyer, advocate and politician; member of the Liberal Party; represented the Toronto riding of Parkdale-High Park in the House of Commons through three successive parliaments 1997–2006
- Richard Butson (1922–2015), medical officer and politician (Ancaster)
- Ivan John "Jack" Cable (1934– ), politician and former commissioner of the Yukon (2000–2005)
- Chris Charlton (1963– ), MA, member of Parliament in the 2006 federal election for Hamilton Mountain
- David Christopherson (1954– ), represents the riding of Hamilton Centre in the House of Commons (2004– )
- Mark Coakley, Hamilton-based activist, lawyer, author and chair of Environment Hamilton
- Sheila Copps (1952– ), PC, HBA, LL.D (hc), journalist and former politician; second-generation member of a political family that has dominated Hamilton-area politics on the municipal, provincial and federal levels
- Victor K. Copps (1919–1988), politician and mayor of Hamilton; the city's landmark sports arena, Copps Coliseum (now TD Coliseum) was named in his honour
- Adam Crooks (1827–1885), LLB, Ontario member of the Legislative Assembly of Ontario for Toronto West, 1871–1874; moved to the riding of Oxford South, 1875–1886; MLA for the Ontario Liberal Party
- Thomas Mayne Daly Sr. (1827–1885), businessman and political figure in Canada West (later Ontario); represented the riding of Perth North in the House of Commons and in the Ontario Provincial Parliament
- Ellen Fairclough (1905–2004), first female member of the Canadian Cabinet; the Ellen Fairclough Building in Hamilton is named after her
- Colin Campbell Ferrie (1808–1856), Hamilton's first mayor
- Sir John Morison Gibson (1842–1929), lawyer, politician, businessman, lieutenant governor of Ontario 1908–1914
- George Hamilton (1788–1836), settler and city founder
- Sir John Strathearn Hendrie (1857–1923), lieutenant governor of Ontario 1914–1919
- Adam Inch (1857–1933), dairy farmer, politician; Inch Park neighbourhood on Hamilton Mountain is named after him
- Sarah Jama, Somali Canadian Muslim politician
- William H. Jarvis (1930–2016), Member of Parliament
- Stan Keyes (Stanley Kazmierczak Keyes) (1953– ), diplomat and former politician
- Sam Lawrence (1879–1959), mayor and pioneer of labour rights in Hamilton
- William Findlay Maclean (1854–1929), politician, Conservative MP for York East and York South, served for 34 years
- Allan MacNab (Sir Allan Napier MacNab) (1798–1862), soldier, lawyer, land speculator, businessman, and former joint premier of the Province of Canada; MacNab Street in Hamilton is named after him
- Quinto Martini (1908–1975), first Italian Canadian elected to Parliament, where he represented Hamilton East from 1957 until he was defeated by Liberal John Munro in 1962
- Catherine McKenna (1971– ), lawyer, former MP for Ottawa Centre, and former Minister of Infrastructure and Communities and Minister of Environment and Climate Change
- James McMillan (1838–1902), U.S. senator from the state of Michigan
- Thomas McQuesten (1882–1948), athlete, militiaman, lawyer, politician and government appointee who lived in Hamilton; helped encourage McMaster University to relocate from downtown Toronto to west Hamilton in 1930
- Bob Morrow (1946–2018), longest-serving mayor in Hamilton's history (1983–2000); selected to serve as an interim councillor for Ward Three in 2014
- John Munro (1931–2003), PC, BA, LL.B, politician, elected to the House of Commons in the 1962 election; Hamilton's John Munro International Airport is named after him
- Devan Nair, 3rd president of Singapore; moved to the United States after his presidency, but later moved to Hamilton, where he died in 2005
- Father Sean O'Sullivan, politician and religious leader
- Saul Rae (1914–1999), diplomat
- Allan Rowe (1955–2015), member of the Nova Scotia Legislative Assembly
- William Eli Sanford (1838–1899), businessman, philanthropist, and politician
- Charles Stewart (1868–1946), politician, premier of Alberta 1917–1921 (Wentworth County)
- Allan Studholme (1846–1919), stove maker and first Ontario Labour MLA
- James Lyle Telford (1889–1960), mayor of Vancouver, B.C. 1939–40 (Valens)
- James Walker (1874– ), politician in Alberta; municipal councillor in Edmonton

== Religion ==
- Michael Baldasaro (1949–2016), Church of the Universe leader
- Charles Coughlin (1891–1979), priest and radio personality
- John Dunjee (1833–1903), freed slave, pastor
- John Christie Holland (1882–1954), became an ordained minister in 1924 and served as pastor of Hamilton's Stewart Memorial Church; in 1953 he was honoured as Hamilton's Citizen of the Year, the first African Canadian given that recognition
- Peter Jones (Kahkewaquonaby) (1802–1856), Methodist missionary of Welsh-Ojibwe heritage

== Science ==
- James Arthur (born 1944), mathematician
- Douglas Barber (1938– ), businessman, founder and former president and CEO of ennum Corp
- Manjul Bhargava (1974– ), mathematician, born in Hamilton; a recipient of the 2014 Fields Medal
- Bertram Brockhouse (1918–2003), Nobel Prize-winning physicist
- Robert N. Clayton (1930–2017), geochemist
- John Charles Fields (1863–1932), mathematician and founder of the Fields Medal for outstanding achievement in mathematics, considered by some to be the Nobel Prize in Mathematics
- Campbell Leckie (1848–1925), engineer; Leckie Park neighbourhood on Hamilton Mountain is named after him
- Louis Nirenberg (1925–2020), mathematician, born in Hamilton; known for work on partial differential equations, especially as applied to the Navier–Stokes problem
- William Parks (1868–1939), geologist and paleontologist, following in the tradition of Lawrence Lambe
- John Rae (1813–1893), physician and polar explorer
- Myron Scholes (1941– ), Nobel Prize-winning economist

=== Invention ===
- Troy Hurtubise (1963–2018), inventor of a prototype for a lightweight armour shell for military purposes that conjures up an image of a Star Wars Imperial stormtrooper
- George Klein (1904–1992), often called the most productive inventor in Canada in the 20th century; inventor of electric wheelchair, microsurgical staple gun, the ZEEP nuclear reactor and the Canadarm
- Steve Mann, inventor of wearable computers who teaches electrical and computer engineering at the University of Toronto
- Thomas Willson (1860–1915), inventor; designed and patented the first electric arc lamps

=== Medicine ===
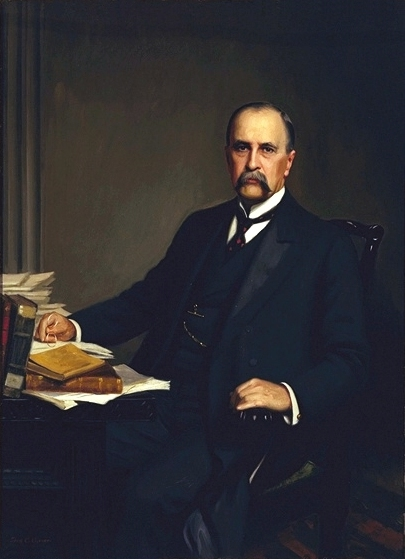
Sir William Osler

- Elizabeth Bagshaw (1881–1982), physician and birth control activist
- John C Bell (1953– ), cancer researcher at the OHRI, developer of oncolytic viral therapies
- David G. Benner, clinical psychologist and author
- John Callaghan (1923–2004), cardiologist who pioneered open-heart surgery
- Harold E. Johns (1915–1998), medical physicist, noted for his extensive contributions to the use of ionizing radiation to treat cancer
- Nathan Francis Mossell 1856–1946, physician, first African-American graduate of the University of Pennsylvania School of Medicine
- James Fraser Mustard (1927–2011), physician, scientist, and founding member of the McMaster University Faculty of Medicine
- Sir William Osler (1849–1919), 1st Baronet, the "father of modern medicine" (Dundas)
- David Sackett (1934–2015), founded the Department of Clinical Epidemiology at McMaster University
- The Honourable William Winegard (1924–2019), educator, engineer, scientist and former member of Parliament

== Sports ==
=== Basketball ===
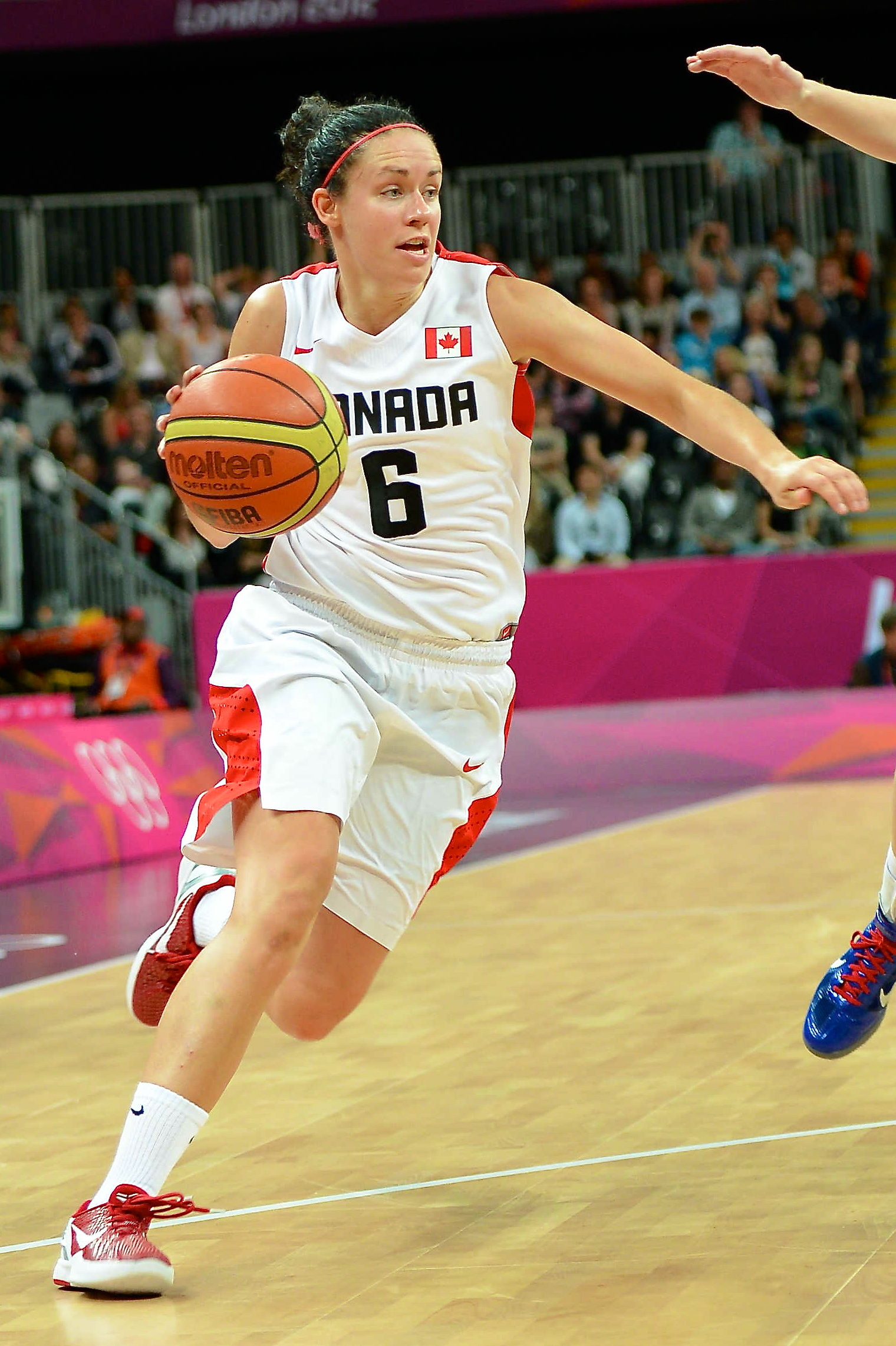
Shona Thorburn

- Shai Gilgeous-Alexander (1998– ), NBA player for the Oklahoma City Thunder; one of eleven players in NBA history to win the regular-season MVP award, the NBA championship, and the Finals MVP award in the same season (2024–25), and only one of four to do so while also winning the scoring title
- Kia Nurse (1996– ), WNBA player for the Toronto Tempo and the Canadian national team
- Shona Thorburn (1982– ), WNBA player for the Seattle Storm; attended Westdale Secondary School in Hamilton

=== Boxing ===
- Jackie Callura (1914–1993), featherweight boxer, World Featherweight Champion of 1943
- Jessica Rakoczy (1977– ), boxer, 2005 WBC Lightweight Champion

=== Darts ===
- Al Bouchie (1972– ), darts player
- Marco Gonthier (1974– ), darts player

=== Figure skating ===
- Toller Cranston (1949–2015), figure skater who won the Olympic bronze medal in 1976
- Bryce Davison (1986– ), figure skater, competed in the pairs event with Jessica Dubé, member of the Hamilton Skating Club; they were Canadian champions three times, were world bronze medallists in 2008, and finished 6th at the Olympics and World Championships in 2010, their last competitive season
- Wendy Griner (born 1944), figure skater

=== Football ===
- John Bonk (1950– ), four-time All-Star offensive lineman in the Canadian Football League, played 1973–1985 for the Winnipeg Blue Bombers
- Less Browne (1959– ), CFL defensive back for Hamilton, Winnipeg, Ottawa and B.C.; holds the CFL and all-pro records for most interceptions in a career with 87; resides in Hamilton
- Bob Cameron (1954– ), played 23 seasons (1980–2002) with the Winnipeg Blue Bombers of the Canadian Football League
- Steve Christie (1967– ), ex-placekicker in the NFL; holds a Super Bowl record for longest field goal kicked, at 54 yards
- Tommy Joe Coffey, Canadian Football League receiver who played for the Hamilton Tiger-Cats; currently resides in Burlington
- Ben D'Aguilar (1989– ), former professional Canadian Football League defensive lineman for the Calgary Stampeders and Hamilton Tiger-Cats
- Peter Dalla Riva (1946– ), former professional Canadian football player with the Montreal Alouettes of the Canadian Football League at the tight end and wide receiver positions; three-time CFL Allstar
- Bernie Faloney (1932–1999), star quarterback football player in the United States and Canada
- Rudy Florio (1950– ), Canadian football player
- Corey Grant (1976– ), former wide receiver for the Saskatchewan Roughriders and Hamilton Tiger-Cats of the Canadian Football League (Stoney Creek)
- Russ Jackson (1936– ), Canadian football quarterback, all-time pass leading Canadian quarterback, three Grey Cups with the Ottawa Rough Riders
- Larry Jusdanis (1970– ), Canadian football quarterback
- Joe Krol (1919–2008 ), Canadian football quarterback (1932–53), Lou Marsh Trophy winner as Canada's top athlete in 1946
- Ron Lancaster (1938–2008), former football player, coach and general manager in the Canadian Football League (CFL) and sports announcer for CBC Television
- Jesse Lumsden (1982– ), former running back with Hamilton, Edmonton, and Calgary of the Canadian Football League and McMaster University alumnus
- Paul Masotti (1965– ), former wide receiver for Toronto Argonauts of the Canadian Football League
- Spencer Moore (1990– ), fullback for the Saskatchewan Roughriders of the Canadian Football League; won the 47th Vanier Cup with the McMaster Marauders and the 101st Grey Cup with the Saskatchewan Roughriders
- Mike Morreale (1971– ), receiver in the Canadian Football League
- Rocco Romano, CFL's DeMarco-Becket Memorial Trophy winner in 1994 and 1996 for the Calgary Stampeders, awarded originally to the player selected as the outstanding lineman in the West Division; inducted into the Canadian Football Hall of Fame in 2007
- Ralph Sazio, player, coach, GM and president of the Hamilton Tiger-Cats; won four Eastern finals and three Grey Cups as coach 1963–1967
- Vince Scott (1925–1992), played for the Hamilton Tiger-Cats; later a Hamilton city councillor
- Jim Young (1943– ), former pro American football and Canadian football player

=== Golf ===
- Bobbi Lancaster, trans woman who reached notoriety playing in the LPGA Qualifying Tournament in 2013

=== Ice hockey ===
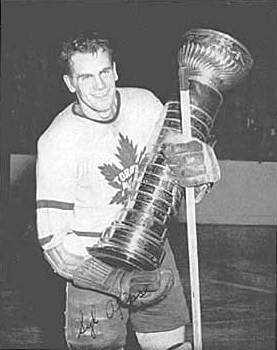
Syl Apps

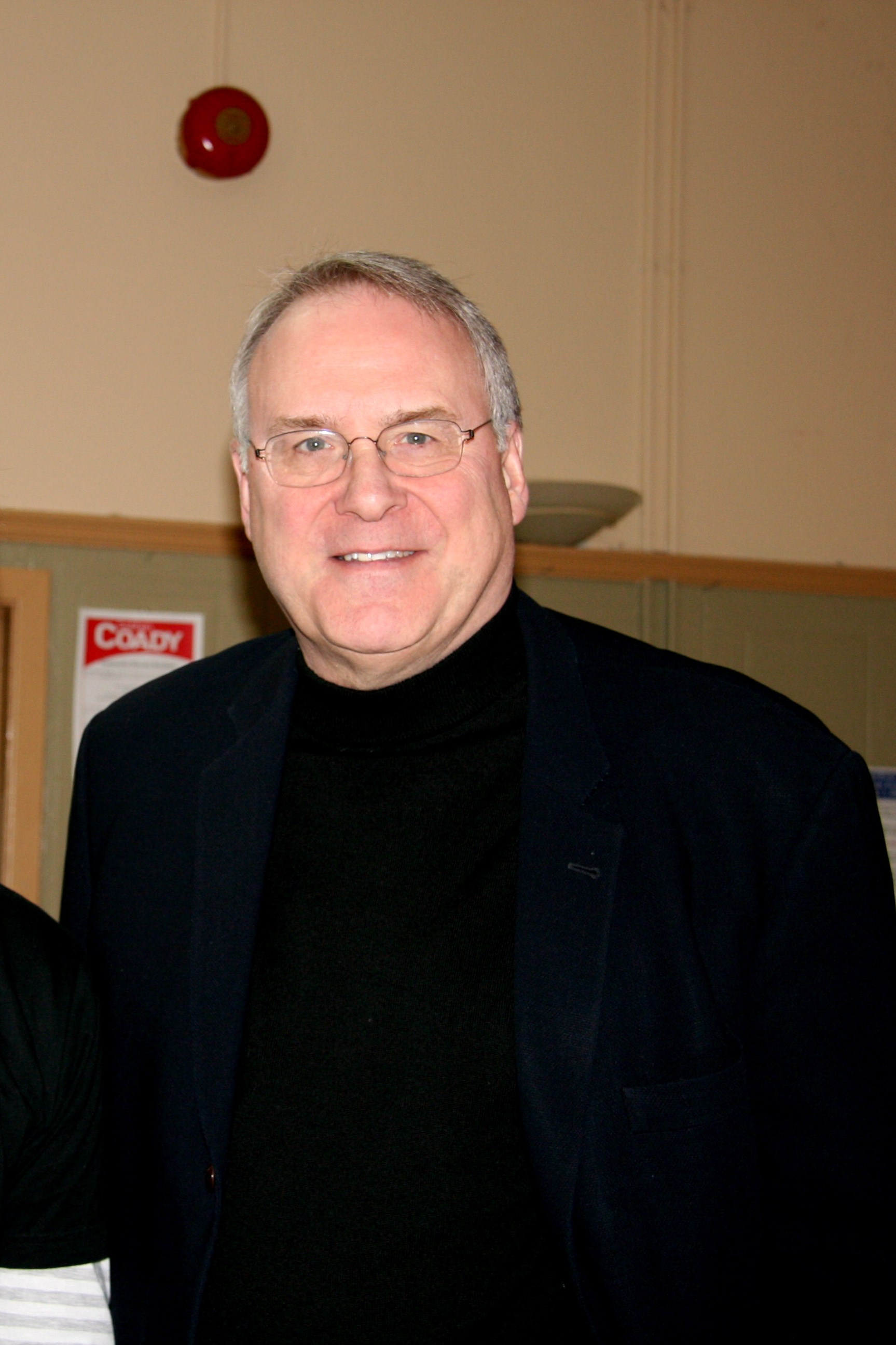
Ken Dryden

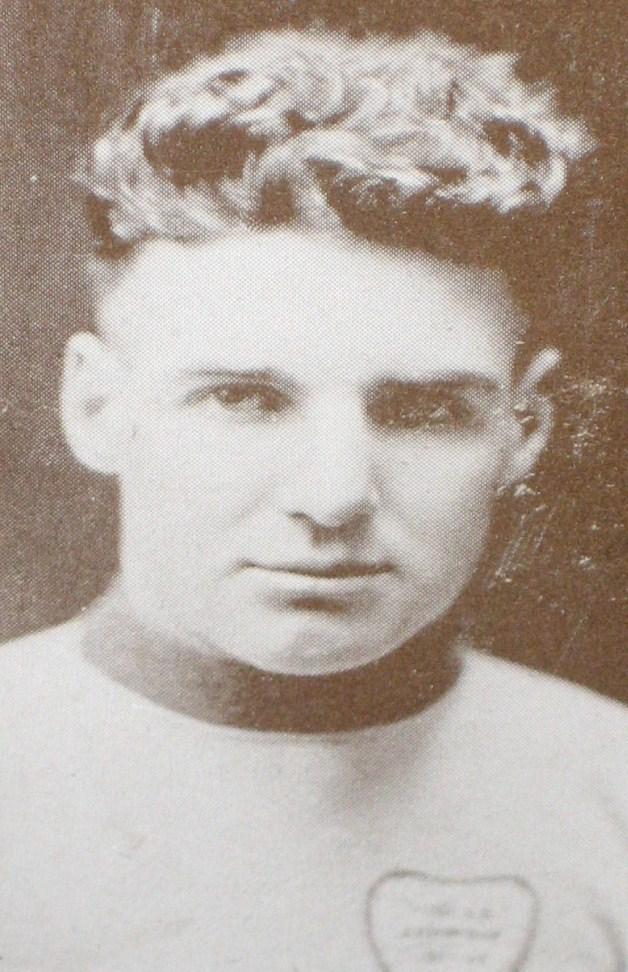
Cecil "Babe" Dye

- Dave Andreychuk (1963– ), 2004 Stanley Cup champion; holds the NHL record for most career power-play goals (274)
- Syl Apps (1915–1998), Toronto Maple Leafs captain who led the Leafs to three Stanley Cups; 1936-37 Calder trophy winner (top NHL rookie); 1941-42 Lady Byng Trophy winner; McMaster University Alumni (Paris, Ontario)
- Paul Beraldo (1967– ), retired hockey centre
- Allan Bester (1964– ), retired NHL hockey goalie, Toronto Maple Leafs
- Andy Brown (1944– ), credited with being the last pro goaltender to play barefaced; last played NHL hockey for the Pittsburgh Penguins
- David Brown (1985– ), Notre Dame Fighting Irish hockey goalie; named team MVP in 2006; named (CCHA); Central Collegiate Hockey Association's Player-of-the-week three times in 2007; favorite to win the 2007 Hobey Baker Award, which is awarded to the top collegiate player in the United States; a Pittsburgh Penguins draft pick in 2004
- Frank Caprice (1962–2025), NHL hockey goalie, six seasons with Vancouver Canucks (1982–88)
- Ben Chiarot (1991– ), defenseman for the Montreal Canadiens of the NHL
- Joe Cirella (1963– ), retired NHL defenseman, 821 games played, No. 5 pick overall in 1981 NHL Entry Draft by the Colorado Rockies
- Sebastian Cossa (2002– ), ice hockey goaltender for the Detroit Red Wings
- Dave Dryden (1941– ), retired NHL hockey goalie, 201 NHL games for Buffalo, Edmonton, Chicago and NY Rangers; created (and was the first goaltender to employ) the modern-day goaltending mask consisting of a fiberglass mask with a cage
- Ken Dryden (1947– ), retired NHL hockey goalie, elected to the Hockey Hall of Fame in 1983
- Blake Dunlop (1953– ), retired NHL hockey player, winner of the 1980–81 Bill Masterton trophy
- Cecil "Babe" Dye (1898–1962), NHL hockey player, its top goal scorer of the 1920s; inducted into the Hockey Hall of Fame in 1970; nicknamed "Babe" because he was considered to be 'the Babe Ruth of hockey'
- Don Edwards (1955– ), retired NHL hockey goalie, winner of the Vezina Trophy in 1979–80
- Ryan Ellis (1991– ), defenseman for the Philadelphia Flyers of the NHL
- Nelson Emerson (1967– ), retired NHL hockey player
- Ray Emery (1982–2018), NHL hockey goalie
- Laura Fortino (born 1991), ice hockey player
- Johnathan Kovacevic (1997– ), NHL player for the New Jersey Devils
- Tyrone Garner (1978– ), played for Calgary Flames as goaltender (born in Stoney Creek)
- Ben Harpur (born 1995), NHL player for the New York Rangers
- Todd Harvey (1975– ), NHL hockey player
- Red Horner (1909–2005), NHL hockey defenseman; helped Toronto Maple Leafs win their first Stanley Cup in 1932
- Tim Horton (1930–1974), NHL hockey defenseman; opened his first Tim Hortons Donut Shop in Hamilton in 1964
- Harry Howell (1932–2019), NHL hockey defenseman, winner of the 1966–67 James Norris Trophy
- Willie Huber (1958– ), retired NHL hockey defenseman; born in (Germany) and grew up in Hamilton
- Dick Irvin Sr. (1892–1957), NHL hockey player, former head coach of Toronto Maple Leafs and Montreal Canadiens
- Mark Jankowski (born 1994), ice hockey centre
- Al Jensen (1958– ), retired NHL hockey goalie, winner of the 1983–84 William Jennings trophy
- Derek King (1967– ), retired NHL hockey player
- Jamie Macoun (1961– ), retired NHL hockey defenseman who played 1,128 NHL games
- Adam Mair (1979– ), NHL hockey player
- Brian McGrattan (1981– ), NHL hockey player for the Phoenix Coyotes; NHL enforcer
- Marty McSorley (1963– ), retired NHL hockey player infamous for his assault of Donald Brashear in a game on 21 February 2001
- Ron Murphy (1933– ), retired NHL player who played in 889 games
- Ric Nattress (1962– ), retired NHL hockey defenseman
- Darnell Nurse (1995– ), current NHL player with the Edmonton Oilers; first round draft pick for the Edmonton Oilers; gold medal winner at the 2015 World Junior Ice Hockey Championship
- Sarah Nurse (1995– ), current PWHL player with the Vancouver Goldeneyes; gold medalist at the 2022 Winter Olympics and silver medalist the 2018 Winter Olympics and the 2026 Winter Olympics; 3 time gold medalist, 2 time silver medalist, and 1 time bronze medalist at the IIHF Women's World Championship.
- Murray Oliver (1937– ), retired NHL hockey player, played in 1,127 NHL games
- George Owen (1901–1986), retired NHL hockey defenceman for the Boston Bruins; served as the Bruins captain in the 1931–32 season; first player credited with wearing a helmet in his rookie season in 1928
- Keith Primeau (1971– ), retired NHL hockey player; born in Toronto and grew up in Hamilton
- Pat Quinn (1943–2014), retired NHL hockey player, former head coach of the Toronto Maple Leafs, Vancouver Canucks, Los Angeles Kings and the Philadelphia Flyers
- Leo Reise Jr. (1922– ), retired NHL hockey defenseman; 494 games played in the 1940s and 1950s for Detroit, Chicago and NY Rangers
- Zac Rinaldo (1990– ), ice hockey player for the Nashville Predators
- Matthew Schaefer (2007– ), defenceman for the New York Islanders
- Rick Smith (1948– ), retired NHL hockey defenseman; 687 games played; No. 7 pick in 1966 NHL Entry draft by the Boston Bruins
- Steve Staios (1973– ), retired NHL hockey defenseman, current GM of the Hamilton Bulldogs
- Danny Syvret (1985– ), NHL hockey defenseman who spent his junior career with the London Knights of the OHL, eventually being named team captain; in his final year of junior hockey, he was captain of a powerhouse team that broke numerous junior hockey records and won the 2005 Memorial Cup (Millgrove)
- John Tonelli (1957– ), retired NHL hockey player; 1984 Canada Cup MVP
- Arber Xhekaj (2001– ), NHL player for the Montreal Canadiens

=== Running ===
- David Griffin (1905–1944), represented Canada in athletics at the 1928 Summer Olympics – Men's 1500 metres and the 1930 British Empire Games, also a journalist for The Hamilton Spectator and Royal Canadian Air Force officer
- Robert Kerr (1882–1963), Irish-Canadian sprinter; won the gold medal in the 200 metres and the bronze medal in the 100 metres at the 1908 Summer Olympics
- Ray Lewis (1910–2003), track & field, first Canadian-born black Olympic medalist
- William/Billy Sherring (1878–1964), athlete, winner of the marathon race at the 1906 Summer Olympics

=== Soccer ===
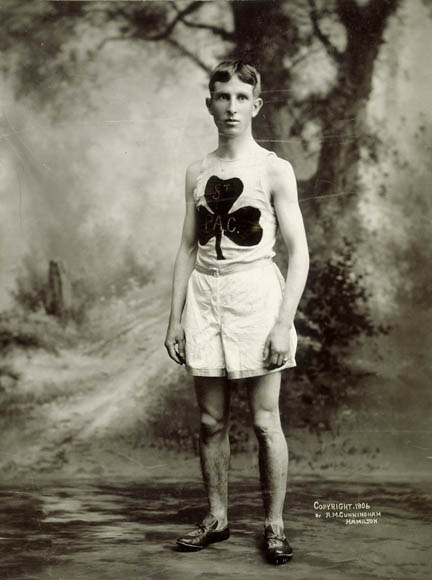
William Sherring

- Valerio Alesi (1966– ), first Canadian-born player in Serie A Soccer
- Bob Bearpark (1943–1996), soccer head coach
- Ian Bennett (1985– ), soccer player who currently plays for the Milwaukee Wave of the Major Indoor Soccer League
- Nick Bontis (1969– ), soccer player and coach elected president of Canada Soccer in November 2020
- Luka Gavran (2000– ), soccer player
- Stefan Mitrović (2002– ), soccer player
- Milan Borjan (1987– ), goalkeeper (Red Star Belgrade, Canadian national soccer team), born in Yugoslavia and raised in Hamilton
- Alex Bunbury (1967– ), played four seasons with the Hamilton Steelers (CSL) 1987–90; voted Best Foreign Player in the Portuguese first division club Maritimo in the 1994–95 season, where he scored 12-goals; a Canadian Soccer Hall-of-Fame inductee in 2006; his son is fellow Hamiltonian soccer star Teal Bunbury
- Teal Bunbury (1990– ), played for the Canadian U17 and U20 teams, as well as the US's U23 team, and national squad; has played professionally for the Sporting Kansas City since 2010; his father is fellow Hamiltonian soccer star Alex Bunbury
- Jamie Dodds (1981– ), soccer player who played for the Toronto Lynx in the USL First Division
- Rhian Dodds (1979– ), midfielder for Kilmarnock F.C. (Scottish soccer)
- Milan Kojic (1976– ), former professional soccer player
- Robert McDonald (1902–1956), soccer player from the 1920s and 1930s who spent a decade playing for famous Scottish football club Rangers
- John McGrane, played nine North American Soccer League seasons and 17 times for the Canadian national soccer team in 'A' internationals; played in the Montreal Olympics; in 2008 he was inducted into Canada's Soccer Hall of Fame
- Jimmy Nicholl (1956– ), Northern Irish football player, 73 International caps
- Ryan Raposo (1999– ), forward for Liaoning Tieren F.C.
- Greg Sutton (1981– ), Canadian International Soccer goalkeeper (Toronto FC)
- Melissa Tancredi (1977– ), Canadian soccer forward who currently plays for Dalsjöfors GoIF and Canada's National Women's team; won an Olympic bronze medal at the 2012 Olympics

=== Thoroughbred horse racing ===
Hamilton is the birthplace of three jockeys in Thoroughbred horse racing whose success led to them being inducted in the Canadian Horse Racing Hall of Fame:

- Jeffrey Fell
- Chris Rogers
- Don Seymour

=== Wrestling ===
- Michelle Fazzari (1987–2024), member of Canada's 2016 Olympic wrestling team
- Johnny K-9 (Ion William Croitoru) (1963–2017), four years in the WWF, including a match against Hulk Hogan
- Glynn Leyshon (1929–2018), wrestler and university professor
- Billy Red Lyons, ex-pro wrestler and TV announcer for Maple Leaf Wrestling
- Angelo Mosca (1938– ), Canadian Football League player between 1958 and 1969 with the Hamilton Tiger-Cats, better known for his pro wrestling career
- Ethan Page (1989– ), born Julian Micevski, born and raised in Stoney Creek; currently signed to WWE, where he performs on the Raw brand.
- Johnny Powers (1943– ), ex-pro wrestler, two-time NWF World champion (1970, 1973)
- "Big John" Quinn (1944– ), retired professional wrestler who competed in North American regional promotions including NWA All-Star Wrestling, Pacific Northwest Wrestling and Stampede Wrestling during the 1960s and early 1970s; cousin of former NHL coach and Hamiltonian Pat Quinn
- Dewey Robertson (1939–2007), "The Missing Link," ex-pro wrestler
- George Scott (1929–2014), professional wrestler, brother and tag partner of Sandy Scott
- Sandy Scott (1934–2010), former professional wrestler, brother and tag partner of George Scott
- Iron Mike Sharpe Jr. (1951–2016), ex-pro wrestler, self-proclaimed "Canada's Greatest Athlete"
- Tonya Verbeek (1977– ), first Canadian woman to medal at the Olympics in wrestling, the silver medal at the 2004 Summer Olympics in women's wrestling in the 55 kg category; at the 2008 Summer Olympics, she won Canada's third medal overall, and the third Canadian medal ever in women's wrestling, a bronze in the 55kg class (Grimsby, ON)

=== Other sports ===
- Doug Didero (1960– ), race car driver
- Eleanor Harvey (1995– ), foil fencer, won gold at the 2015 Pan American Games, represented Canada at the 2016 Summer Olympics
- Melanie Hawtin (1988– ), wheelchair racer and wheelchair basketball player
- Ray Lazdins (1964– ), retired discus thrower, represented Canada twice at the Summer Olympics
- Irene MacDonald (1931–2002), Canada's champion diver 1951–1961; won medals at the 1954 and 1958 Commonwealth Games; in 1956 she won Canada's first Olympic diving medal, a bronze
- Joanne Malar (1975– ), former freestyle and medley swimmer; competed in three consecutive Summer Olympics
- Luke McGrath (1993– ), rugby union scrum-half for Leinster Rugby and the Ireland national rugby union team
- Pat Messner (1954– ), water skier, winner of the 1972 Summer Olympics bronze
- Frank O'Rourke (1894–1986), ex-pro baseball player and long time New York Yankees scout
- Chrissy Redden (1966– ), cross-country mountain biker
- Linda Thom (1943– ), women's shooting (25m pistol) gold at the 1984 Summer Olympics

== Miscellaneous ==
- Alexander Aitchison, first full-time fire chief of Hamilton
- Étienne Brûlé (1592–1633), probably the first European to visit what is now Hamilton in 1616
- Marion Stinson Crerar (1859–1919), clubwoman and WWI worker
- Regan Russell (1955–2020), animal rights activist
- Tuhbenahneequay (Sarah Henry) (1780–1873), mother of missionary Peter Jones
- Eileen Vollick (1908–1968), aviator; first Canadian woman to earn a private pilot's certificate
