= Hamilton Community Foundation =

Hamilton Community Foundation (HCF) is a community foundation that pools donations and financial endowments into a coordinated investment and grant-making facility dedicated primarily to the social improvement of Hamilton, Ontario. Its current President and CEO is Terry Cooke, the former Regional Municipality of Hamilton-Wentworth regional chair and Hamilton Spectator columnist.

HCF is the oldest community foundation in Ontario. It was founded in 1954 and modeled after the Winnipeg Community Foundation, the first community foundation in Canada. The concept of a permanent endowment that issued grants was unfamiliar to Hamiltonians at first, and HCF secured just $100 in gifts in its first year. However, it reached $10 million in assets by the Foundation's 40th anniversary in 1995. In 2017, the Foundation's assets stand at some $193 million.

HCF is governed by a board of directors who are selected by a nominating committee that consists of the Mayor, Chief of Police, President of the Hamilton Chamber of Commerce, President of the Hamilton Law Association, and Chair of the United Way of Burlington and Greater Hamilton and up to two members at large.

== Historical timeline ==
1954

- HCF becomes first community foundation in Ontario; one of the first in Canada. It was established through Private Act of provincial parliament and staffed by volunteer executive director Cameron MacGillivray. Founding board members included James V. Young.

1982

- Judith McCullogh becomes first full-time executive director.

1995

- Carolyn Milne becomes the CEO of the Foundation, whose assets total $10 million.

2000

- $40 million donation was made by philanthropist Joyce Young, one of the largest gifts in Canadian history at that time. The donation enables HCF to launch strategic philanthropy with a broad community consultation and research on the best ways to use its position and resources.
- Our Millennium is launched; HCF's first community engagement process. The initiative asked local citizens to make a gift of time, labour or money to a community project. Over 250,000 people, including preschoolers and seniors, registered as participants and more than 450 monetary gifts were donated.
- A focus on youth in philanthropy is established with the launch of a Youth Advisory Council.

2003

- Growing Roots...Strengthening Neighbourhoods program is launched.

2004 – 50th Anniversary

- HCF board launches Tackling Poverty Together, granting $3 million towards poverty reduction initiatives in over four years. The program is subsequently expanded in 2007 to TPT II: Building Strong Neighbourhoods, culminating in over a decade of funding and community leadership under TPT II.

2005

- Protecting Our Environment Together is launched, with a strategic focus on citizen and youth engagement and increasing the sustainability of the environmental sector.

2010

- Terry Cooke, former Regional Municipality of Hamilton-Wentworth regional chair, became President & CEO.
- HCF produced its first Vital Signs report with the Hamilton Spectator. The report reinforced the city's neighborhood disparity issue, which The Spec had brought to public attention in its Code Red series.

2011

- HCF announces its partnership with the Community Forward Fund to offer loans with CFF providing the due diligence, administration, and evaluation services and also offering financial advisory services to loan recipients.
- The first community investment fund loan is made to Hamilton Artists Inc. a long-standing artist-run centre that aims to support and reflect the diverse environment of the community. The loan supported the completion of a building project in the city's James Street North arts community while awaiting promised financing that had been delayed.

2012

- Young Fund was used as pilot portfolio for Impact Investing. A loan is made to the Mustard Seed co-op, a social enterprise dedicated to locally produced and sustainable food.
- HCF hosts David Johnston, Governor General of Canada for a visit to Hamilton.

2013

- Women 4 Change, HCF's first collective giving fund was launched. In response to research that demonstrates the disparate needs of women, the group's goal is to support programs and initiatives that advance the lives of women and girls in the community while helping local women to become philanthropic leaders.

2014 – 60th Anniversary

- Supported by Pioneer Energy, HCF invited all residents of Hamilton to access cultural, recreational, heritage and conservation sites for free for a Celebrate Your Community day.
- HCF adopts a new visual identity and tagline, "History made, future intended", reflecting its collective legacy to Hamilton and the opportunity to be a part in shaping its future.
- During an anniversary celebration to acknowledge and thank the community, the Hogarth Family of Pioneer Energy announces a $4 million gift to the foundation.

2015

- Established "20 by 2020" target for impact investments. This involves achieving 20% of HCF assets represented by impact investments by the year 2020.

2016

- Launched ABACUS, a partnership initiative of HCF and The Fairmount Foundation which focuses on improving education prospects for students in middle-school years.
- David Johnston, Governor General of Canada addresses a group of 400 guests at Cathy Wever School in celebration of ABACUS initiative.
- HCF received Standards Program accreditation from Imagine Canada.
- HCF led review of City of Hamilton's Neighborhood Action Strategy (NAS).
- HCF joined Hamilton Anchor Institution Leadership (HAIL) group.
- HCF achieved granting of $7.9 million.

2017

- With support from Community Foundations of Canada the Community Fund for Canada's 150th, HCF marked Canada 150 milestone with A Place to Belong event that invites all members of the community to enjoy 50 cultural, recreational and nature areas across the city with free admission and parking.
- HCF partnered with Community Foundations of Canada to provide $200,000 of granting to local projects to mark Canada 150.
- HCF achieved $7.2 million in granting and community leadership spending, surpassing $100 million in granting since its founding in 1954.

== Community leadership ==
HCF has disbursed over $96 million in grants since its formation in 1954. The grants are distributed across all charitable sectors in the community: arts, education, environment, health and human services and recreation.

The foundation has long been known for its community leadership in addressing priority issues that affect Hamiltonians. Addressing the city's high poverty rate, it launched a multi-year commitment to poverty reduction in 2002, with a focus on strengthening low-income neighborhoods, engaging and supporting residents to take a leadership and have a voice in the changes needed. This strategy was later adopted by the City of Hamilton in creating the Neighbourhood Development Strategy office in 2010. HCF was a co-founder of the Hamilton Roundtable for Poverty Reduction with the City of Hamilton and other community stakeholders. "HRPR" has earned national attention for its innovative approach to poverty reduction.

Community leadership projects include:

- ABACUS: Advancing post-secondary access. ABACUS is a ten-year partnership initiative of HCF and the Fairmount Foundation. Recognizing the impact that increased high school graduation and post-secondary access would have on Hamilton, ABACUS focuses on improving the academic, community and environmental factors that most directly affect the likelihood of students continuing their education. By starting intervention in the middle-school years, the goal is to help young Hamiltonians facing multiple barriers increasingly access post-secondary education.

The ABACUS initiative has three components:
1. Grants to community organizations for programming that increases students’ exposure to, and readiness for, post-secondary education
2. Grad Track pilot program for youth facing multiple barriers
3. Identifying systems-level barriers and challenges in Hamilton

- Strengthening neighbourhoods and reducing poverty. HCF supports neighborhoods in different ways:
  - Funding community development workers in all of the NAS communities. These workers play an important role in helping resident leaders to connect and engage their fellow citizens.
  - Supporting small grants programs in priority neighborhoods. The funds enable neighbors to develop and implement projects most meaningful to their community.
  - Hamilton Roundtable for Poverty Reduction: HCF and the City of Hamilton launched the Roundtable over a decade ago to focus on systemic-level change needed to reduce and eliminate poverty in Hamilton. As the 2015 recipient of the national Cities Reducing Poverty Award, the Roundtable continues to be acknowledged for its collaborative efforts to influence public policy and promote social inclusion
  - (RE)Imagining NAS. In 2016, City of Hamilton asked HCF to review the Neighborhood Action Strategy. This involves working closely with residents to develop research, and feedback to improve and conceptualize NAS.
- Neighbourhood Leadership Institute. This program enhances the skills of neighborhood and community leaders from the NAS communities by allowing them to participate in leadership training while developing a local project idea. The NLI is composed of two distinct streams:
  - Resident Leadership stream: Participants engage in leadership training and develop project ideas for their neighborhoods
  - Professional Development stream: Launched in 2016, this stream an academically recognized program developed in partnership with McMaster Centre of Continuing Education.

== Impact investing ==
In October 2010, HCF's board of directors established the $5 million Hamilton Community Investment Fund enabling the foundation to put more of its assets to work locally. The fund enables the foundation to invest directly some of its assets into the community, or social/environmental enterprises, rather than into the stock market. The investments can take the form of direct investment into charitable or non-profit ventures, or as loans to qualified organizations for purposes which further the foundation's mission.

In 2013, HCF moved on a number of investment strategies targeting financial returns coupled with social impact, using the majority of The Young Fund – HCF's largest donor-advised fund – as a pilot for selecting socially responsible investments in the public markets (where environmental, social and governance practices are important investment considerations). The balance of The Young Fund is being used for directly investing in funds and organizations that seek both social and financial returns.

Impact investing at HCF follows two streams:

- Local: Loans to charities, not-for-profits, and social enterprises to support or accelerate the delivery of their mission. Examples of local loans include Hamilton Artists Inc., Mustard Seed co-op, Neighbors 2 Neighbors Hamilton Community Food Centre, Indwell affordable housing communities, the Cootes to Escarpment EcoPark and the Westdale Cinema Group. To date, HCF has approved $5.2 million in local loans.
- National/Global: Investments designed to provide financial return while delivering positive social and/or environmental outcomes. This includes a broad range of investment opportunities that diversify HCF's impact portfolio and encourage the widespread growth of impact investing for community good. Examples include: Artscape Launchpad, Greensoil Building Innovation Fund, CoPower, Renewal 3 Trust, Mercer Private Investment Partner III-Sustainable Opportunities Fund and Trillium Housing Fund.

In 2015, HCF also established a "20 by 2020" impact investing target. The proposed goal is to have 20% of HCF assets represented by impact investments by the year 2020. To date, HCF has committed some $18 million to impact investments.

== Hamilton's Vital Signs Reports ==
On October 4, 2012, HCF published the third edition of Hamilton's Vital Signs, an update on its two previous reports which examine various aspects of community health, in co-operation with the Hamilton Spectator. Hamilton's Vital Signs looks at such aspects as the gap between rich and poor, environment, belonging and leadership, economy, learning, health, housing, transportation, arts, safety and education. The reports have supported the findings of wide neighborhood disparity brought to public attention by the Spectator's Code Red series.

The 2015 Vital Signs report takes a critical look at the socio-economic landscape of Hamilton, acknowledging that not every Hamiltonian or neighborhood shares in the prosperity. The report shows that basic needs such as affordable housing, secure jobs and a living wage continue to be a priority for many residents.

== Hamilton Vital Signs TV ==
A monthly series on local station Cable 14 hosted by HCF CEO and President Terry Cooke. Each episode features guests discussing a variety of topics. The show aims to stimulate community awareness, conversation and action on the issues that affect quality of life for all Hamiltonians.

Episode	Air date	Guests
ArcelorMittal Dofasco Community Legacy in Hamilton	June 6, 2017	Tony Valeri (Vice President Corporate Affairs, ArcelorMittal Dofasco)
I Am Committed & Canada 150	May 7, 2017	Hugh Tye (Executive Director, Hamilton Legal Clinic) and Lyndon George (Indigenous Justice Coordinator, Hamilton Legal Clinic)
Food insecurity	April 4, 2017	Sarah Stern (Leader, Maple Leaf Centre for Action on Food Security) and Adam Watson (Project Manager, City of Hamilton)
Westdale Cinema Group	March 7, 2017	Fred Fuchs (Member, Westdale Cinema Group) and Jeremy Freiburger (Chief Connector and Cultural Strategist, CoBALT Connects)
Code Clubs	February 7, 2017	Beth Gibson (Industry Education Council of Hamilton) and Kevin Browne (Software Hamilton)
Millennials in Hamilton	January 3, 2017	Alyssa Lai (Past Chair, Hamilton HIVE) and Jeffrey Martin (Researcher, School of Labour Studies, McMaster University)
Changing Face of Hamilton	December 2016	Sara Mayo (Social Planner at SPRC Hamilton) and Steve Buist (Investigative Reporter at the Hamilton Spectator)
Philanthropy Month	November 1, 2016	Lisa Dalia (Owner, Solee Shoes) and Charles Criminisi (Lawyer and Partner, Agro Zaffiro)
Economic development in Hamilton	October 1, 2016	Jason Thorne (General Manager Planning and Economic Development, City of Hamilton)
The Arts in Hamilton	September 2016	Claire Calnan (Executive Director, Hamilton Festival Theatre Company), Nea Reid (Artistic Director, Hamilton Youth Poets), Carol Kehoe (Executive Director, Hamilton Philharmonic Symphony Orchestra)
Neighbour 2 Neighbour Community Food Centre	June 20, 2016	Denise Arkell (Executive Director, Neighbour 2 Neighbour) and Nick Saul (President & CEO, Community Food Centres)
McQuesten Urban Farm	May 16, 2016	Pat Reid (McQuesten Neighbourhood Planning Team) and Adam Watson (Neighbourhood Action Strategy, City of Hamilton)
Community Benefits Agreements and LRT	April 18, 2016	Colette Murphy (Executive Director, Atkinson Foundation) and Paul Johnson (Director LRT Project Coordination, City of Hamilton)
ABACUS	March 21, 2016	Duane Dahl (Assistant Director, Kiwanis Boys and Girls Club) and Leo Johnson (Executive Director, Empowerment Squared)
Our Healthy Future in Hamilton	February 22, 2016	Rob MacIsaac, (President & CEO, Hamilton Health Sciences)
Cootes to Escarpment Eco Park	January 18, 2016	David Galbraith (Head of Science RBG) and Jen Baker (Land Securement Coordinator, Hamilton Naturalists Club)
The Meaning of Philanthropy	November 16, 2015	Chris Farias (Partner, VP Creative, Kitestring), Sarah Murphy, (Investment Advisor, CIBC Wood Gundy), Dr. Ninh Tran (Associate Medical Officer of Health, City of Hamilton)
2015 Vital Signs Report	October 26, 2016	Sara Mayo (Social Planner, SPRC) and Howard Elliott (Managing editor, Hamilton Spectator)
Immigration in Hamilton	September 21, 2015	Keith Monrose (Dean, International and Partnerships, Mohawk College) and Ines Rios (Executive Director, Immigrants’ Workers Centre)
