= Quebec Open (darts) =

Tournament information
- Venue: Sheraton Saint-Hyacinthe Hôtel
- Location: Saint-Hyacinthe, Quebec
- Country: Canada
- Established: 1978 (men's); 2006 (women's)
- Organisation(s): NDFC; BDO, category D WDF category Bronze
- Format: Legs
- Prize fund: C$3,800
- Month(s) Played: January

Current champion(s)
- (Canada) David Cameron (Men's) (Canada) Samantha Gibbons (Women's)

The Quebec Open is a Canadian darts tournament that has been held since 2006 the event comprises both men's singles and doubles and women's singles and doubles competition.

== List of winners ==
=== Men's ===
Year	Champion	Score	Runner-up	Total Prize Money	Champion	Runner-up
1978	(Canada) Allan Hogg	?–?	(Canada) Hillyard Rossiter			
1979	(Canada) Allan Hogg	?–?	(Canada) Bob Sinnaeve			
1980	(Canada) Bob Sinnaeve	?–?	(United States) Len Heard			
1981	(Canada) Arnold Parke	?–?	(Canada) Ray Kippari			
1982	(Canada) Arnold Parke	?–?	(United States) Dave Miller			
1983	(Canada) Bob Sinnaeve	?–?	(Singapore) Paul Lim			
1984	(Canada) Rick Bisaro	?–?	(Canada) Bob Sinnaeve			
1985	(Canada) Joe Gorski	?–?	(Canada) Arnold Parke			
1986	(Canada) Bill Steinke	?–?	(Canada) Bob Sinnaeve			
1987	(Canada) Danny MacInnis	?–?	(United States) Rick Ney			
1988	(United States) Nicky Virachkul	?–?	(Canada) Albert Anstey			
1989	(United States) Calvin Peters	?–?	(Canada) Tony Holyoake			
1990	(United States) Tony Payne	?–?	(Canada) Bob Sinnaeve			
1991	(United States) Tony Payne	?–?	(United States) Gerald Verrier			
1992	(Canada) Carl Mercer	?–?	(United States) Sean Downs			
1993	(Canada) John Part	?–?	(United States) Sammy Cruz			
1994	(Canada) John Part	?–?	(Canada) Alan Roy			
1995	(Canada) Rick Fortin	?–?	(Canada) Guy Tremblay			
1996	(Canada) John Part	?–?	(Canada) Richard Marcotte			
1997	(Canada) Carol Brassard	?–?	(Canada) Richard Marcotte			
1998	(Canada) Paul Cullen	?–?	(Canada) Ian Johnson			
1999	(Canada) John Part	?–?	(Canada) Gaston Gagne			
2000	(Canada) Alan Valcourt	?–?	(Canada) Yves Chamberland			
2001	(England) Phil Taylor	?–?	(England) Peter Manley			
2002	(Canada) John Part	?–?	(Canada) Paul Bolduc			
2003	(England) Dennis Priestley	?–?	(England) Colin Lloyd			
2004	(Canada) Christian Chartrand	?–?	(Canada) Guy Tremblay			
2005	(Canada) Sebastien Gagnon	?–?	(Canada) Bernard Beaudoin			
2006	(Canada) Jon MacDougall	5–0	(Canada) Martin Tremblay	C$1,600	C$800	C$400
2007	(Canada) Al Bouchie	?–?	(Canada) Jerry Hull	C$2,800	C$800	C$400
2008	(Canada) Gerry Convery	?–?	(Canada) Mario Isabelle	C$2,400	C$800	C$400
2009	(Canada) Richard Marcotte	?–?	(Canada) Martin Tremblay	C$2,400	C$800	C$400
2010	(Canada) Marco Gonthier	5–3	(Canada) Marcel Simard	C$2,400	C$800	C$400
2011	(Canada) Marcel Simard	beat	(Canada) Terry Hayhurst	C$2,750	C$1,000	C$500
2012	(Canada) David Dionne	beat	(Canada) Marcel Simard	C$2,750	C$1,000	C$500
2013	(Canada) David Cameron	beat	(Canada) Andy Rust	C$2,750	C$1,000	C$500
2014	(Canada) Paul Bolduc	beat	(Canada) David Cameron	C$2,750	C$1,000	C$500
2015	(Canada) Dawson Murschell	beat	(Canada) Marcel Simard	C$2,750	C$1,000	C$500
2016	(Canada) Dawson Murschell	beat	(Canada) Steve Warnock	C$2,750	C$1,000	C$500
2017	(Canada) Martin Tremblay	beat	(Canada) Ross Snook	C$2,750	C$1,000	C$500
2018	(Canada) Dave Cameron	beat	(Canada) Marcel Simard	C$2,750	C$1,000	C$500
2019	(Canada) Ross Snook	beat	(Canada) Jacques Dionne	C$2,750	C$1,000	C$500
2020	(Canada) David Cameron	beat	(Canada) Keifer Durham	C$2,800	C$1,000	C$500

=== Women's ===
Year	Champion	Score	Runner-up	Total Prize Money	Champion	Runner-up
2006	(Canada) Manon Trembley	beat	(Canada) Roxanne Van Tassel			
2007	(Canada) Kim Whaley-Hilts	beat	(Canada) Lise Filiatrault			
2008	(Canada) Kim Whaley-Hilts	4–0	(Canada) Sandra Walker			
2009	(Canada) Roxanne Van Tassel	beat	(Canada) Kim Whaley-Hilts			
2010	(United States) Cali West	4–3	(Canada) Dianne Gobeil			
2011	(Canada) Robin Curry	4–3	(Canada) Cindy Hayhurst			
2012	(Canada) Cindy Hayhurst	4–2	(Canada) Dianne Gobeil			
2013	(Canada) Cindy Hayhurst	4–0	(Canada) Kim Whaley-Hilts			
2014	(Canada) Dianne Gobeil	4–3	(Canada) Maria Mason			
2015	(Canada) Dianne Gobeil	4–0	(Canada) Shelley Watson-Miller			
2016	(Canada) Cindy Hayhurst	4–0	(Canada) Marie-Julie Chartrand			
2017	(Canada) Dianne Gobeil	beat	(Canada) Kim Whaley-Hilts			
2018	(Canada) Dianne Gobeil	beat	(Canada) Rhonda Maidment			
2019	(Canada) Darlene Van Sleeuwen	beat	(Canada) Danna Foster	C$1,000	C$400	C$200
2020	(Canada) Samantha Gibbons	beat	(Canada) Darlene Van Sleeuwen	C$1,000	C$400	C$200

== Tournament records ==
- Most wins 2: (Canada) Dawson Murschell.
- Most Finals 4: (Canada) Marcel Simard.
- Most Semi Finals 7: (Canada) Marcel Simard.
- Most Quarter Finals 7: (Canada) Marcel Simard.
- Most Appearances 8: (Canada) Marco Gonthier, (Canada) Marcel Simard, (Canada) Martin Tremblay.
- Most Prize Money won C$3,418: (Canada) Marcel Simard.
- Best winning average () : .
- Youngest Winner age 19: (Canada) Dawson Murschell .
- Oldest Winner age 52: (Canada) Gerry Convery.
