= Joyce Young =

Canadian philanthropist (1926–2023)

Joyce Young (9 February 1926 – 19 September 2023) was a Canadian woman famous for a single act of philanthropy, a donation of CAD$40 million to the Hamilton Community Foundation in 2000. She is the wife of Bill Young, a retired Major in the Canadian Armed Forces and the aunt of Red Hat, Inc. founder Bob Young.

== Early life ==
Young was born Frances Joyce Ferrie in Hamilton on 9 February 1926.

Bill Young graduated from Hillfield Strathallan College in 1935 and Joyce graduated from Hillfield in 1943. After graduating, Bill served in the Canadian military during World War II, serving in England, Italy, and northwest Europe. The couple met after Bill returned from the war.

Joyce left The University of Toronto to become a full-time home-maker. The couple had three children.

== Red Hat, Inc. ==
Young and her husband Bill Young, both residents of Ancaster, Ontario, opted to help their nephew Bob with his high-tech venture shortly after its founding in 1993. Bob's company, Red Hat, Inc., is one dedicated to open source software such as Red Hat Linux, and the proprietary Red Hat Enterprise Linux.

When Red Hat's stock rose significantly after its initial public offering in 1999, the elder Youngs were able to sell enough stock to recoup their initial investment, but chose to retain some stocks. Joyce was quoted as saying,

"While I respect Bob as a businessman, I quite honestly never thought I'd see my money again. I really just wanted to support him. After holding the company's stock for three years, I took out my original investment, and left some money in just for fun."

By January 2000, the remaining stock was valued in the millions. This enabled Joyce to make a donation of CAD$40 million in June 2000, to the Hamilton Community Foundation. The money was given for the purpose of improving Hamilton-area health facilities. This act represented one of the largest charitable donations in Canadian history. A long-time volunteer with local community groups, Joyce later stated her biggest concern was in giving away the money responsibly.

Joyce Young died on 19 September 2023 at the age of 97.

== Projects ==
- $50,000 was donated to Hillfield Strathallan College.
- $50,000 was donated for the beautification of the Royal Military College of Canada Memorial Arch.
- $50,000 was donated to the Juno Beach Centre.

Established by 2552 Major (Ret'd) Bill Young (RMC 1936) and Joyce Young, the J.D. Young Memorial lecture, a speech given at the Royal Military College of Canada, as well as other activities by the Young Memorial Visitor, honour the memories of 2360 Major John Douglas Young (RMC 1937) who was killed in action on D-Day, and his father, Maj.-Gen. James V. Young (RMC 1911). Major Doug Young, having no known grave, is commemorated in the Bayeux Memorial in Calvados.
