= Al Bouchie =

Canadian darts player

Personal information
- Nickname: "The Iceman"
- Born: Canada
- Home town: Ontario, Canada

Sport
- Sport: Darts
- Playing since: 1996
- Laterality: Right-handed
- Walk-on music: "Ice Ice Baby" by Vanilla Ice

Organisation (see split in darts)
- BDO: 2006–2007
- PDC: 2004–2005

WDF major events – best performances
- World Masters: Last 190: 2007

Other tournament wins
- Tournament: Years
- Quebec Open: 2007

Al Bouchie is a Canadian former professional darts player who won the Quebec Open in January 2007. Prior to it, he came in 16th place in both Canadian Open in June 2006 and Windy City Open in September 2005. After his Quebec win, he was qualified for the BDO World Darts Championship on 15 November of the same year and three days later participated at the World Masters Tournament.
