= Inch Park =

Public park in Hamilton, Ontario

Coordinates: 43°14′11″N 79°51′37″W

Inch Park is a public park in the city of Hamilton, Ontario, Canada, located in the Mountain Inch neighbourhood. The park opened in 1948, when the Inch family gave part of their family farm to the city for use as a park.

== Name ==
The park, like the neighbourhood, is named in honour of Adam Inch (1857–1933) and his wife, Jaqueline. Inch, an immigrant form Scotland, purchased 100 acres, including the 18 acres where the park now stands, in 1875, when he was 17 years old. He and his wife built a prosperous farm with orchards and a dairy herd. By the late 1920, development in the area led to the decision to subdivide the farm into suburban building lots. The scheme fell through during the Great Depression.

== Sports facilities ==
The park features a swimming pool, tennis courts, baseball diamonds, a rugby pitch and an indoor ice rink.

In the 21st century, sports facilities at Inch Park were improved to make them accessible to physically challenged individuals.

The swimming pool is briefly stocked with rainbow trout before the swimming season opens, and an annual fishing derby is held for local children.

=== Ice rink ===
The Inch Park skating rink opened as an outdoor rink on December 18, 1953. Construction of a roofed rink began on March 27, 1970. In 1982 the roofed rink was converted to an indoor rink In 1982, the rink became a fully enclosed, indoor ice rink. The old rink was replaced by a modern, indoor rink in 1995.
