= Marco Gonthier =

Canadian darts player

Personal information
- Born: December 18, 1970 (age 55) Amqui, Quebec, Canada
- Home town: st-leon-le-grand,quebec, Canada

Sport
- Sport: Darts
- Playing since: 1997
- Laterality: Right-handed
- Walk-on music: "Livin' on a Prayer" by Bon Jovi

Organisation (see split in darts)
- BDO: 2008–2017
- PDC: 2005–2006
- WDF: 2020–

WDF major events – best performances
- World Masters: Last 64: 2008

Other tournament wins
- Tournament: Years
- Halifax Open Quebec Open: 2008; 2010

Marco Gonthier (born December 18, 1970) is a Canadian former professional darts player who participated in many Quebec and Halifax Opens.

== Career ==
Gonthier appeared at the Quebec Open for the first time on January 19, 2008, and after that participated at the BDO World Darts Championship on December 4 of the same year. Three days later, he took part in the World Masters where he scored last in 64 have losing to Ian Jones 3-2 (sets). On January 18, 2009, he became a quarter finalist at the Quebec Open and on January 17 of next year became its winner. On March 7 of the same year, he became a Halifax Open quarter finalist and then played last 16 at both the Quebec Open on January 16, 2011, and at the Halifax Open on March 6 of the same year. On January 21, 2012, he became a semi finalist at Quebec Open and then played last 16 at the Halifax Open during both 2012 and 2013 seasons. In June 2017 he represented Quebec at the National Darts Championship in Saint-Jean, New Brunswick. He resides in Saint-Léon-Le-Grand.
